= Monaco =

Microstate in Western Europe

Principality of Monaco Principauté de Monaco Principatu de Múnegu
- Flag Coat of arms
- Motto: "Deo Juvante" (Latin) (English: "With God's Help")
- Anthem: "Inu Munegascu" (English: "Monégasque Hymn")
- Location of Monaco (green) in Europe (dark grey)
- Capital: Monaco (city-state) (Note: Monaco has no official distinct capital city as it is a city-state.); 43°43′52″N 07°25′12″E
- Largest quarter: Monte Carlo
- Official languages: French
- Common languages: Italian; Monégasque (traditional)
- Religion: 86.0% Christianity; 82.3% Catholicism (official); 3.7% other Christian; 11.7% no religion; 1.7% Judaism; 0.4% Islam; 0.2% other
- Demonym: Monégasque
- Government: Unitary parliamentary semi-constitutional monarchy
  - Monarch: Albert II
  - Minister of State: Christophe Mirmand
- Legislature: National Council

Independence
  - House of Grimaldi (under the sovereignty of the Republic of Genoa): 8 January 1297
  - from the French Empire: 17 May 1814
  - from occupation of the Sixth Coalition: 17 June 1814
  - Franco-Monégasque Treaty: 11 February 1861
  - Constitution: 5 January 1911

Area
  - Total: 2.084 km^{2} (0.805 sq mi) (194th)
  - Water (%): negligible

Population
  - 2025 census: ▲38,857 (190th)
  - Density: 18,446/km^{2} (47,774.9/sq mi) (2nd)
- GDP (PPP): 2024 estimate
  - Total: ▲$8.924 billion (165th)
  - Per capita: ▲$270,100
- GDP (nominal): 2024 estimate
  - Total: ▲$10.434 billion
  - Per capita: ▲$315,800
- Currency: Euro (€) (EUR)
- Time zone: UTC+1 (CET)
  - Summer (DST): UTC+2 (CEST)
- Date format: dd/mm/yyyy
- Calling code: +377
- Internet TLD: .mc
- 1. Government offices are located in the Monaco-Ville quarter.; 2. GDP per capita calculations include non-resident workers from France and Italy.

Monaco, (Note: /ˈmɒ.nə.koʊ/, MON-ə-koh; French: [mɔnako]; Italian: [ˈmɔːnako]; Monégasque: Mu̍negu [ˈmuneɡu]; Occitan: Mónegue [ˈmuneɣe]) officially the Principality of Monaco, (Note: French: Principauté de Monaco; Monégasque: Prinçipatu de Mu̍negu; Ligurian: Prinçipato de Mónego; Occitan: Principat de Mónegue; Italian: Principato di Monaco.) is a sovereign city-state and microstate in Western Europe. Situated on the French Riviera, it is a semi-enclave bordered by France to the north, east, and west, with the Mediterranean Sea to the south; the Italian region of Liguria is about 15 km (9.3 mi) east. With a population of 38,423 living in an area of 2.08 km^{2} (0.80 sq mi), Monaco is the second smallest sovereign state in the world, after Vatican City, as well as the most densely populated. It also has the world's shortest national coastline of any non-landlocked nation, at 3.83 km (2.38 mi). Fewer than 10,000 of its residents are Monégasque nationals. Although French is the official language of Monaco, Italian and Monégasque are also widely spoken and understood. (Note: For further information, see Languages of Monaco.)

Monaco is governed under a form of semi-constitutional monarchy, with Prince Albert II as head of state, who holds substantial political powers. The prime minister, who is the head of government, can be either a Monégasque or French citizen; the monarch consults with the Government of France before an appointment. Key members of the judiciary are detached French magistrates. The House of Grimaldi has ruled Monaco, with brief interruptions, since 1297. The state's sovereignty was officially recognised by the Franco-Monégasque Treaty of 1861, with Monaco becoming a full United Nations voting member in 1993. Despite Monaco's independence and separate foreign policy, its defence is the responsibility of France, notwithstanding two small military units.

Monaco is recognised as one of the wealthiest and most expensive places in the world. Its economic development was spurred in the late 19th century with the opening of the state's first casino, the Monte Carlo Casino, and a rail connection to Paris. The country's mild climate, scenery, and gambling facilities contributed to its status as a tourist destination and recreation centre for the wealthy. Monaco has become a major banking centre and sought to diversify into the services sector and small, high-value-added, non-polluting industries. Monaco is a tax haven; it has no personal income tax (except for French citizens) and low business taxes. Over 30% of residents are millionaires, with real estate prices reaching €100,000 ($116,374) per square metre in 2018. Monaco is a global hub of money laundering, and in June 2024 the Financial Action Task Force placed Monaco under increased monitoring to combat money laundering and terrorist financing.

Monaco is among the 46 member states which constitute the Council of Europe. It is not part of the European Union (EU), but participates in certain EU policies, including customs and border controls. Through its relationship with France, Monaco uses the euro as its sole currency. Monaco joined the Council of Europe in 2004 and is a member of the Organisation internationale de la Francophonie (OIF). It hosts the annual motor race, the Monaco Grand Prix, one of the original Grands Prix of Formula One. The local motorsports association gives its name to the Monte Carlo Rally, hosted in January in the French Alps. The principality has a club football team, AS Monaco, which competes in French Ligue 1 and has been French champions on multiple occasions, as well as a basketball team, which plays in the EuroLeague. Monaco is a centre of marine conservation and research, being home to one of the world's first protected marine habitats, an Oceanographic Museum, and the International Atomic Energy Agency Marine Environment Laboratories, the only marine laboratory in the UN system.

== History ==
Monaco was first mentioned by the Greek historian Hecataeus of Miletus, who referred to it as "Monoikos, a Ligurian town". Strabo referred to it as Monoikon limen, explaining that Monoikos (Greek for "the solitary one") was another name for Heracles, who had a temple here; it is possible, however, that it is an alteration of an older Ligurian name.

In 1191, the Holy Roman Empire granted Monaco to the Genoese in return for cracking down on pirates. By the early 1200s, the Genoese had built a castle on the rock and were utilizing the port. An ousted branch of a Genoese family, the Grimaldis, captured it in 1297 by posing as monks, but then had to contest it for a century before gaining official control. Though the Republic of Genoa would last until the 19th century, it allowed the Grimaldi family to keep Monaco. Likewise, both France and Spain left it alone for hundreds of years due to agreements with either of them, especially for defence. France annexed it in the French Revolution at the end of the 18th century, but after the defeat of Napoleon it was put under the care of the Kingdom of Sardinia.

In the 19th century, when Sardinia became a part of Italy, the region came under French influence but France allowed it to remain independent and it escaped being incorporated into Italy. However, it shrank considerably when it traded two nearby towns in exchange for sovereignty from France. Monaco relied on tourism from the late 19th century to remain financially solvent, and it was at this time the famous casino and hotels were established. Monaco was overrun by the Axis powers in the 1940s during the Second World War and for a short time was administered by Italy, then Nazi Germany, before being liberated. Although the occupation lasted for just a short time, it resulted in the deportation of the Jewish population and execution of several French Resistance members from Monaco. Since then Monaco has been independent. It has taken some steps towards integration with the European Union.

=== Arrival of the Grimaldi family ===
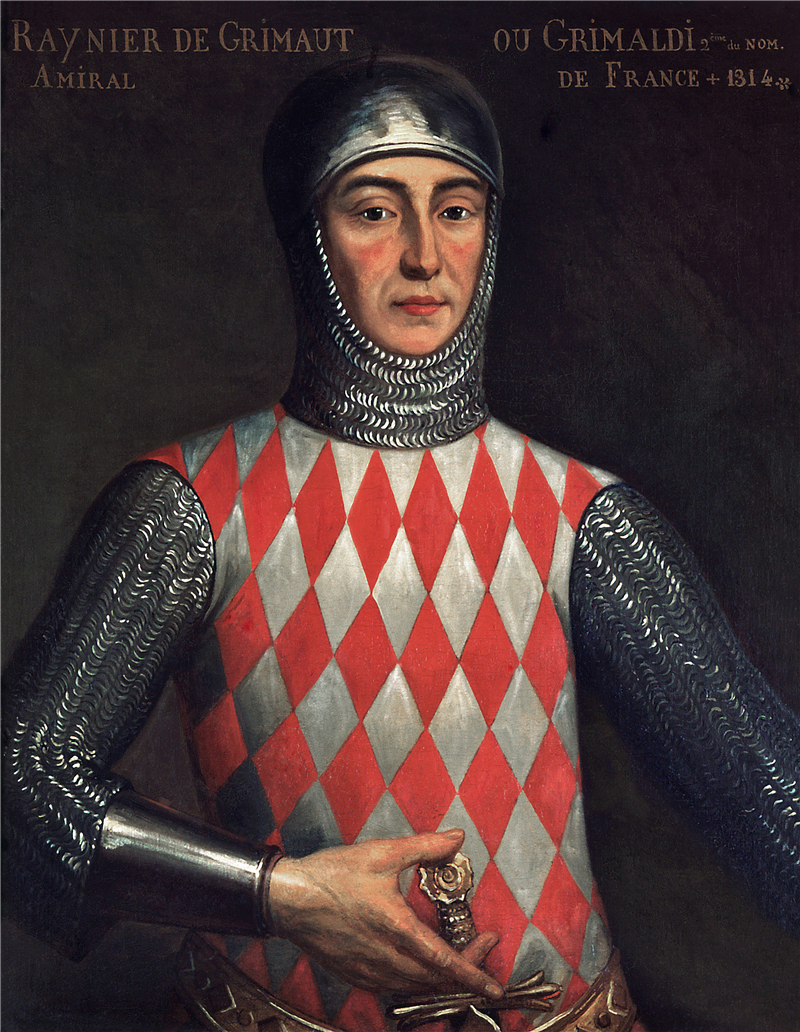
Rainier I, victor of the naval battle at Zierikzee and first sovereign Grimaldi ruler of Monaco

Following a grant of land from Emperor Henry VI in 1191, Monaco was refounded in 1215 as a colony of Genoa. Monaco was first ruled by a member of the House of Grimaldi in 1297, when Francesco Grimaldi, known as "Malizia" (translated from Italian either as "The Malicious One" or "The Cunning One"), and his men captured the fortress protecting the Rock of Monaco while dressed as Franciscan friars – a Monaco in Italian – although this is a coincidence as the area was already known by this name.

Francesco was evicted a few years later by the Genoese forces, and the struggle over "the Rock" continued for another century. The Grimaldi family was Genoese and the struggle was something of a family feud. The Genoese engaged in other conflicts, and in the late 1300s Genoa lost Monaco after fighting the Crown of Aragon over Corsica. Aragon eventually became part of a united Spain, and other parts of the land grant came to be integrated piecemeal into other states. Between 1346 and 1355, Monaco annexed the towns of Menton and Roquebrune, increasing its territory by almost ten times.

=== 1400–1800 ===
Monaco (as part of the Republic of Genoa) in 1494

In 1419, the Grimaldi family purchased Monaco from the Crown of Aragon and became the official and undisputed rulers of "the Rock of Monaco". In 1612, Honoré II began to style himself "Prince" of Monaco. In the 1630s, he sought French protection against the Spanish forces and, in 1642, was received at the court of Louis XIII as a "duc et pair étranger".

The princes of Monaco became vassals of the French kings while at the same time remaining sovereign princes. Though successive princes and their families spent most of their lives in Paris, and intermarried with French and Italian nobilities, the House of Grimaldi is of Genoese origin. The principality continued its existence as a protectorate of France until the French Revolution.

=== 19th century ===
A map of the County of Nice showing the area of the Italian kingdom of Sardinia annexed in 1860 to France (light brown). The area in red had already become part of France before 1860.

In 1793, Revolutionary forces captured Monaco and until 1814 it was occupied by the French (in this period much of Europe had been overrun by the French armies). The principality was reestablished in 1814 under the Grimaldis. It was designated a protectorate of the Kingdom of Sardinia by the Congress of Vienna in 1815. Monaco remained in this position until 1860 when, by the Treaty of Turin, the Sardinian forces pulled out of the principality; the surrounding County of Nice (as well as Savoy) was ceded to France. Monaco became a French protectorate once again. Italian was the official language in Monaco until 1860, when it was replaced by French.

Before this time there was unrest in Menton and Roquebrune, where the townspeople had become weary of heavy taxation by the Grimaldi family. They declared their independence as the Free Cities of Menton and Roquebrune, hoping for annexation by Sardinia. France protested. The unrest continued until Charles III of Monaco gave up his claim to the two mainland towns (some 95% of the principality at the time) that had been ruled by the Grimaldi family for over 500 years.

These were ceded to France in return for 4,100,000 francs. The transfer and Monaco's sovereignty were recognised by the Franco-Monégasque Treaty of 1861. In 1869, the principality stopped collecting income tax from its residents—an indulgence the Grimaldi family could afford to entertain thanks solely to the extraordinary success of the casino. This made Monaco a playground for the rich and a favoured place for them to live.

=== 20th century ===
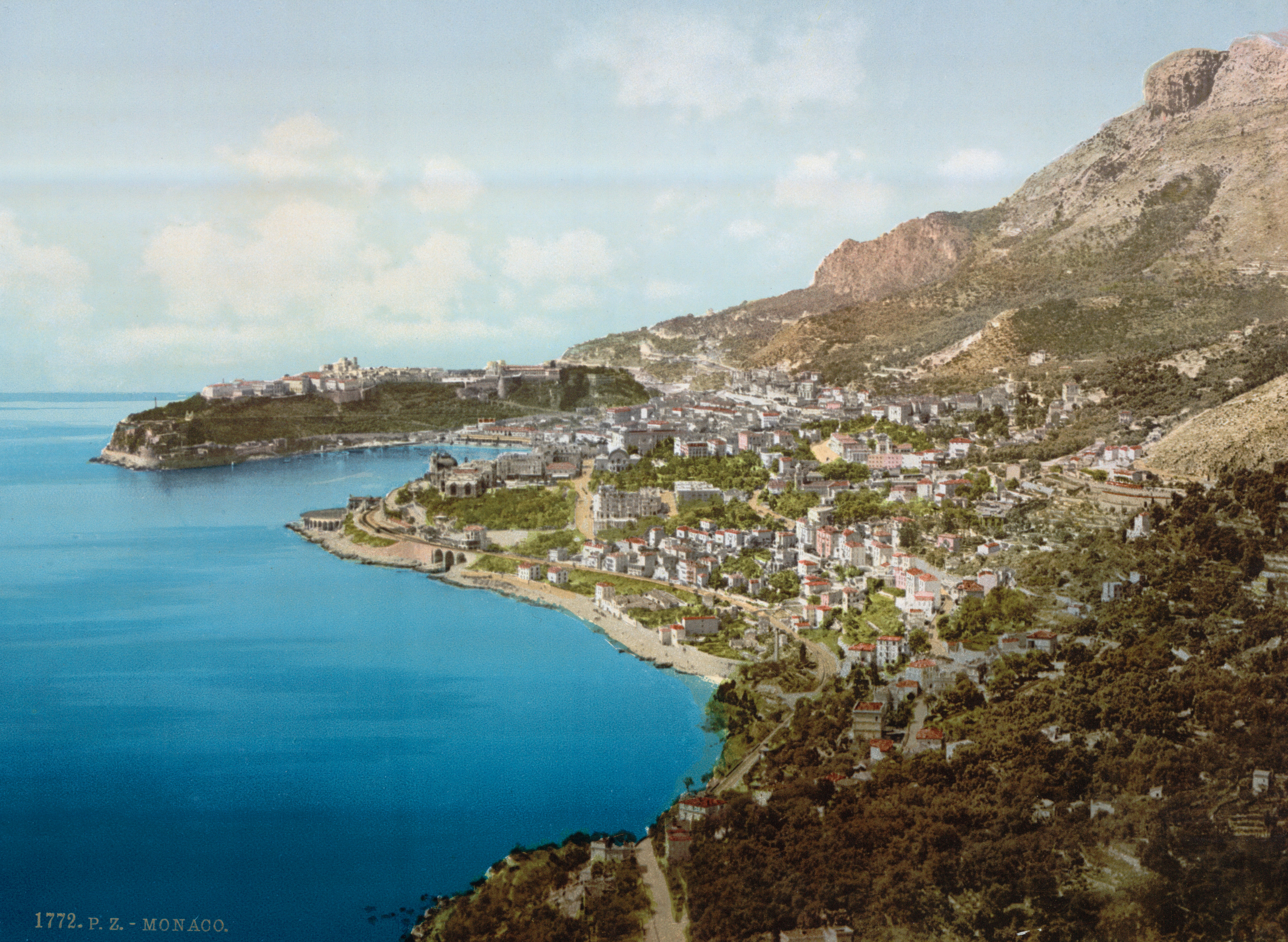
Photochrom of Monaco circa 1900

Until the Monégasque Revolution of 1910 forced the adoption of the 1911 Constitution of Monaco, the princes of Monaco were absolute rulers. The new constitution slightly reduced the autocratic rule of the Grimaldi family and Prince Albert I suspended it during the First World War.

In July 1918, a new Franco-Monégasque Treaty was signed, providing for limited French protection over Monaco. The treaty, endorsed in 1919 by the Treaty of Versailles, established that Monégasque international policy would be aligned with French political, military and economic interests. It also resolved the Monaco succession crisis.

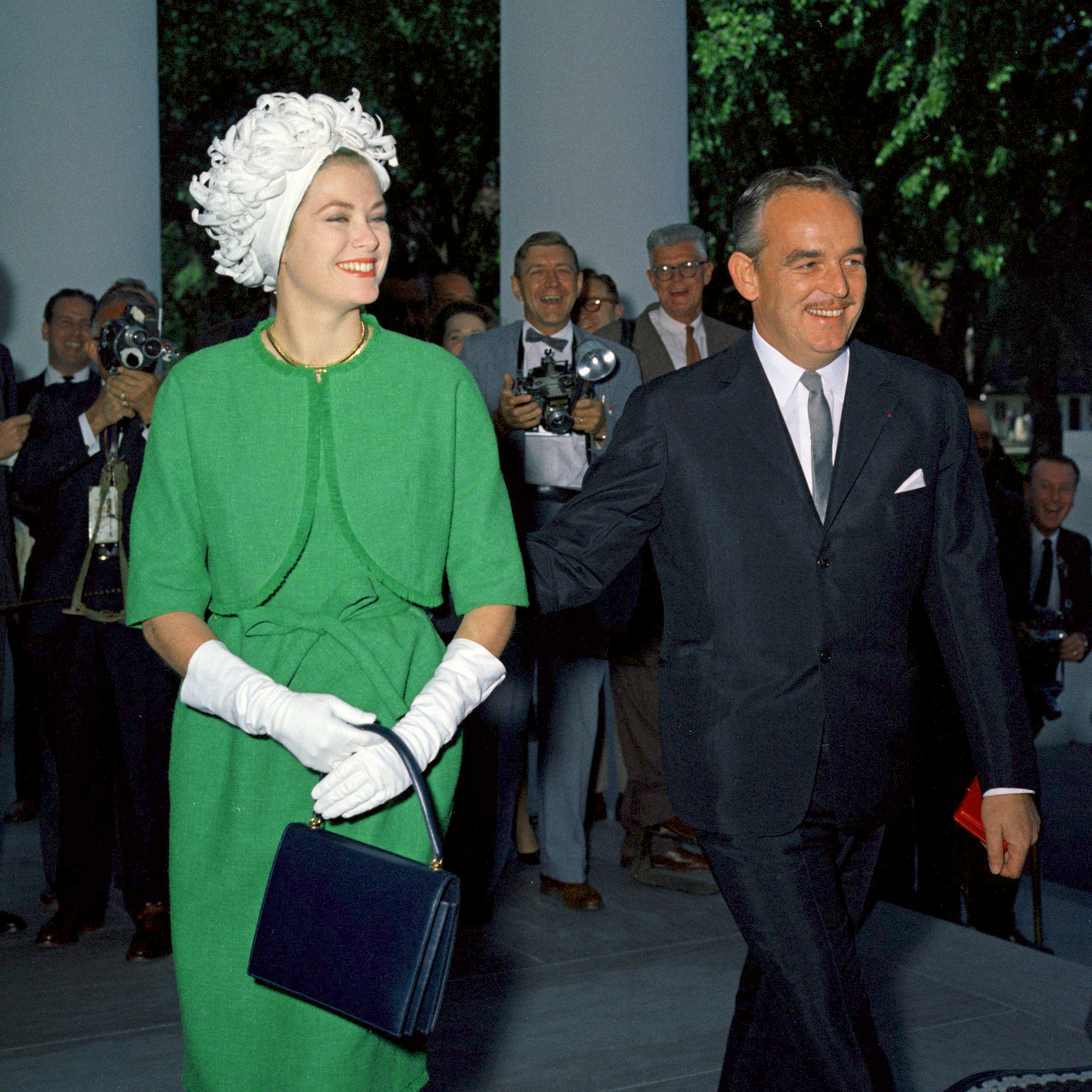
The marriage of Hollywood actress Grace Kelly to Prince Rainier III brought media attention to the principality.

In 1943, the Italian Army invaded and occupied Monaco, forming a fascist administration. In September 1943, after Mussolini's fall from power, the German Wehrmacht occupied Italy and Monaco, and the Nazi deportation of the Jewish population began. René Blum, the prominent French Jew who founded the Ballet de l'Opéra in Monte Carlo, was arrested in his Paris home and held in the Drancy deportation camp outside the French capital before being transported to Auschwitz, where he was later murdered. Blum's colleague Raoul Gunsbourg, the director of the Opéra de Monte-Carlo, helped by the French Resistance, escaped arrest and fled to Switzerland. In August 1944, the Germans executed René Borghini, Joseph-Henri Lajoux and Esther Poggio, who were Resistance leaders.

Rainier III, succeeded to the throne on the death of his grandfather, Prince Louis II, in 1949, and ruled until 2005. On 19 April 1956, Prince Rainier married the American actress Grace Kelly, an event that was widely televised and covered in the popular press, focusing the world's attention on the tiny principality.

A 1962 amendment to the constitution abolished capital punishment, provided for women's suffrage and established a Supreme Court of Monaco to guarantee fundamental liberties. In 1963, a crisis developed when Charles de Gaulle blockaded Monaco, angered by its status as a tax haven for wealthy French citizens.

In 1993, the Principality of Monaco became a member of the United Nations, with full voting rights.

=== 21st century ===
In 2002, a new treaty between France and Monaco specified that, should there be no heirs to carry on the Grimaldi dynasty, the principality would still remain an independent nation rather than revert to France. Monaco's military defence is still the responsibility of France.

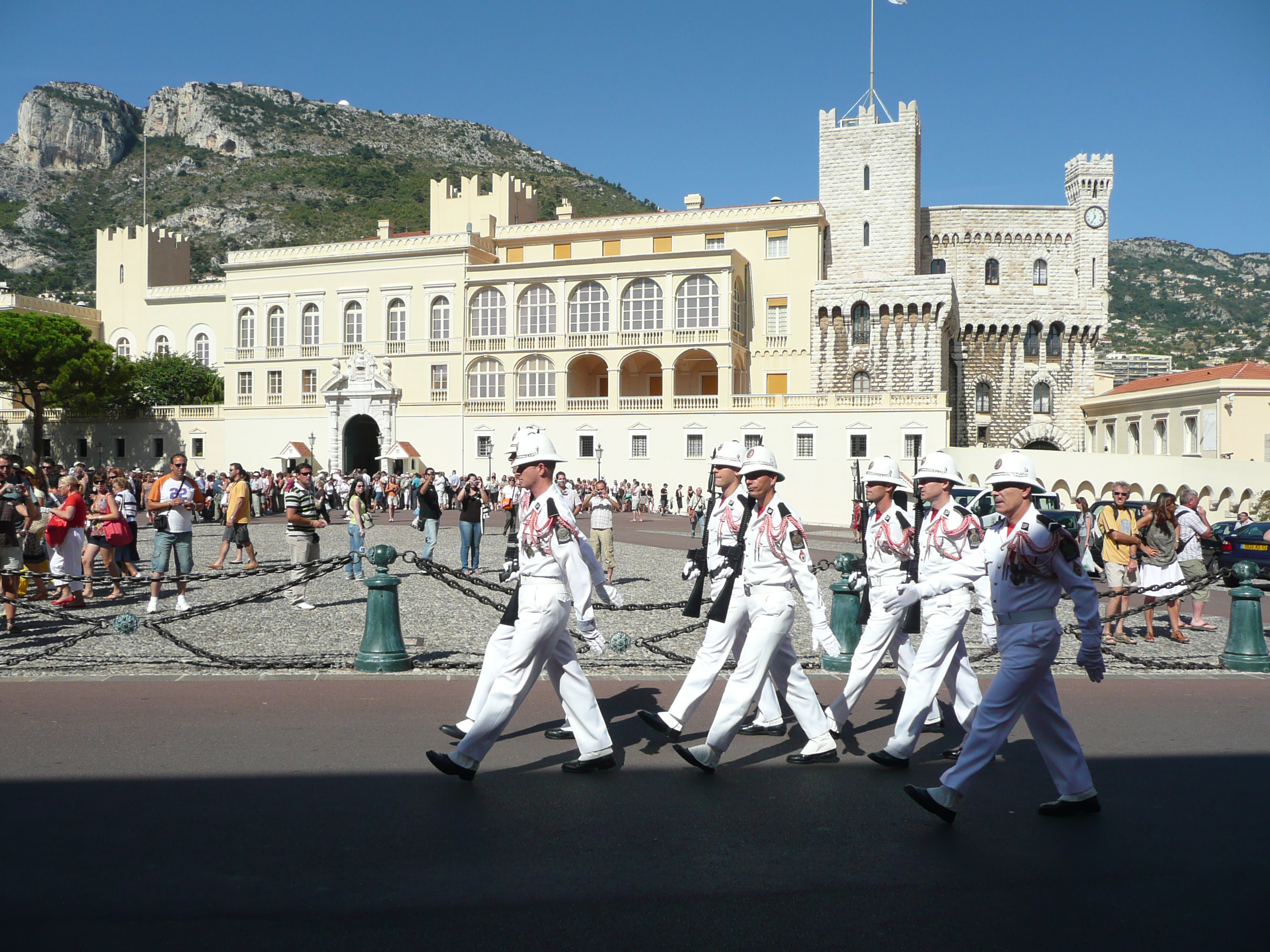
Prince's Palace of Monaco

On 31 March 2005, Rainier III, who was too ill to exercise his duties, relinquished them to his only son and heir, Albert. He died six days later, after a reign of 56 years, with his son succeeding him as Albert II, Sovereign Prince of Monaco. Following a period of official mourning, Prince Albert II formally assumed the princely crown on 12 July 2005, in a celebration that began with a solemn Mass at Saint Nicholas Cathedral, where his father had been buried three months earlier. His accession to the Monégasque throne was a two-step event with a further ceremony, drawing heads of state for an elaborate reception, held on 18 November 2005, at the historic Prince's Palace in Monaco-Ville. On 27 August 2015, Albert II apologised for Monaco's role during World War II in facilitating the deportation of a total of 90 Jews and resistance fighters, of whom only nine survived. "We committed the irreparable in handing over to the neighbouring authorities women, men and a child who had taken refuge with us to escape the persecutions they had suffered in France," Albert said at a ceremony in which a monument to the victims was unveiled at the Monaco cemetery. "In distress, they came specifically to take shelter with us, thinking they would find neutrality."

In 2015, Monaco unanimously approved a modest land reclamation expansion intended primarily to accommodate desperately needed housing and a small green/park area. Monaco had previously considered an expansion in 2008, but had called it off. The plan is for about six hectares (15 acres) of apartment buildings, parks, shops and offices to a land value of about 1 billion euros. The development will be adjacent to the Larvotto district and also will include a small marina. There were four main proposals, and the final mix of use will be finalised as the development progresses. The name for the new district is Anse du Portier.

On 29 February 2020, Monaco announced its first case of COVID-19, a man who was admitted to the Princess Grace Hospital Centre then transferred to Nice University Hospital in France.

On 3 September 2020, the first Monégasque satellite, OSM-1 CICERO, was launched into space from French Guiana, France aboard a Vega rocket. The satellite was built in Monaco by Orbital Solutions Monaco.

On 28 March 2026, Pope Leo XIV visited Monaco. The visit was part of the ongoing, centuries-old ties that bind the Grimaldi dynasty, which has reigned over Monaco since 1297, to the Successors of Peter. It also aimed to strengthen the "long-standing and trusting" diplomatic relations, according to the press office of the Prince's Palace, between the two smallest states in the world.

== Geography ==
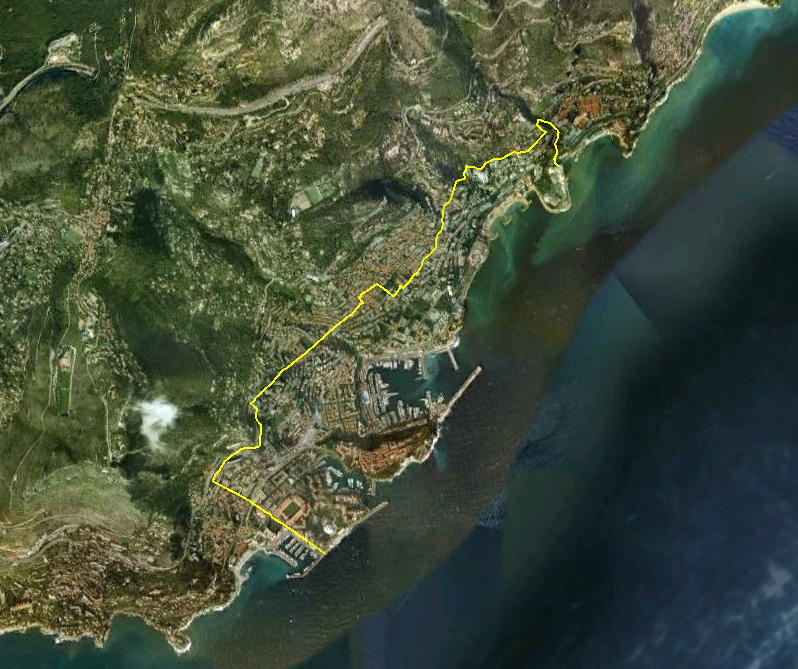
Satellite view of Monaco, with the France–Monaco border shown in yellow

Monaco is a sovereign city-state, with five quarters and ten wards, located on the French Riviera in Western Europe. It is bordered by France's Alpes-Maritimes department on three sides, with one side bordering the Mediterranean Sea. Its centre is about 16 km (9.9 mi) from Italy and only 13 km (8.1 mi) northeast of Nice.

It has an area of 2.1 km^{2} (0.81 sq mi), or 208 ha (510 acres), and a population of 38,400, making Monaco the second-smallest and the most densely populated country in the world. The country has a land border of only 5.47 km (3.40 mi), a coastline of 3.83 km (2.38 mi), a maritime claim that extends 22.2 km (13.8 mi), and a width that varies between 1,700 and 349 m (5,577 and 1,145 ft).

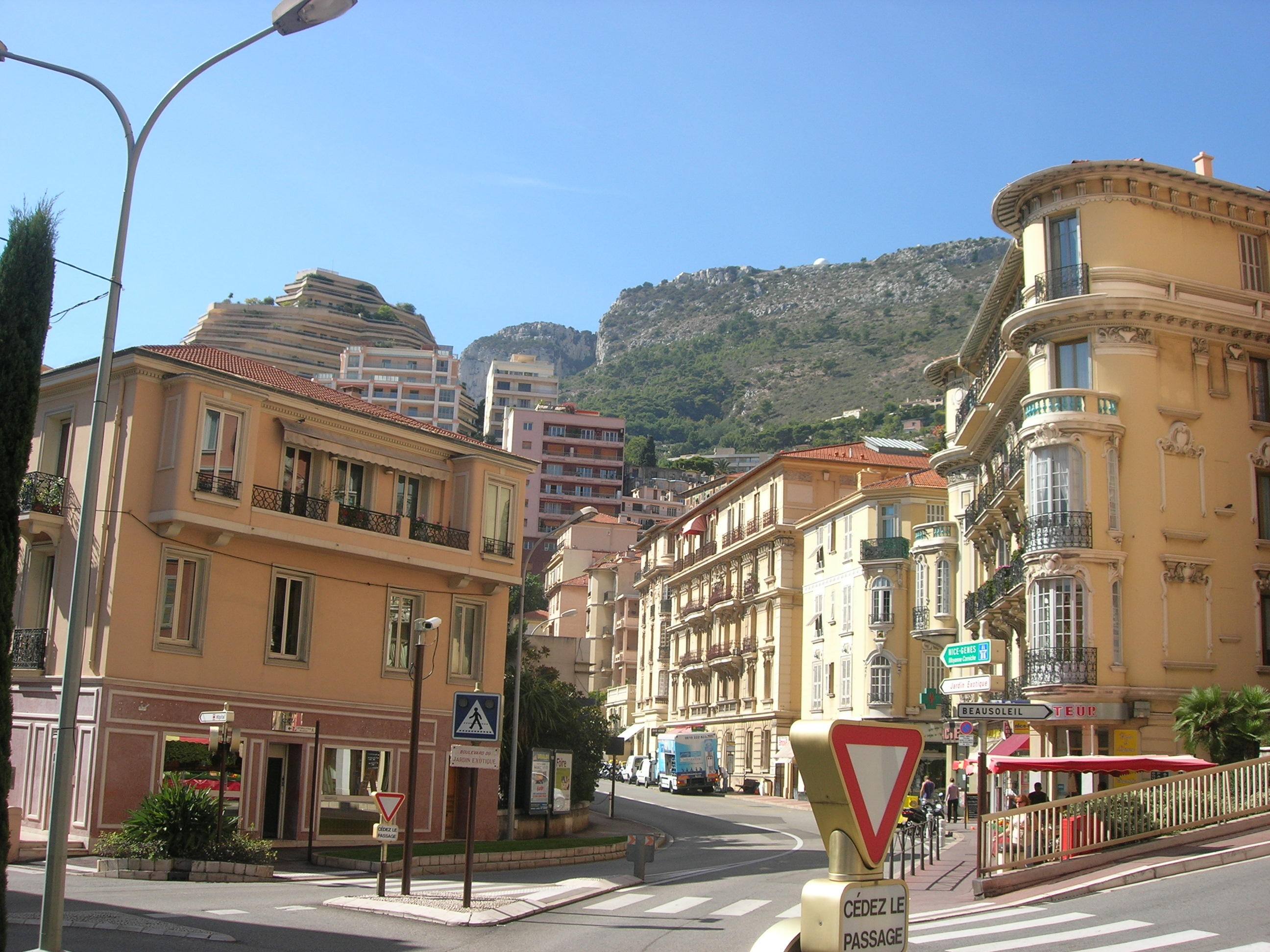
Lamarck intersection, Les Moneghetti

Jurassic limestone is a prominent bedrock which is locally karstified. It hosts the Grotte de l'Observatoire, which has been open to the public since 1946.

The highest point in the country is at the access to the Patio Palace residential building on the Chemin des Révoires (ward Jardin Exotique) from the D6007 (Moyenne Corniche street) at 164.4 m (539 ft) above sea level. The lowest point in the country is the Mediterranean Sea.

Saint-Jean brook is the longest flowing body of water, around 0.19 km (190 m; 0.12 mi; 620 ft) in length, and Fontvieille is the largest lake, approximately 0.5 ha (1.2 acres) in area. Monaco's most populated quartier is Monte Carlo, and the most populated ward is Larvotto.

With the inauguration of Le Portier in 2024, Monaco's total area grew to 2.08 km^{2} (0.80 sq mi) or 208 ha (510 acres); subsequently, new plans were approved to extend the district of Fontvieille by 0.08 km^{2} (0.031 sq mi) or 8 ha (20 acres), with land reclaimed from the Mediterranean Sea. Land reclamation projects include extending the district of Fontvieille. There are two ports in Monaco, Port Hercules and Port Fontvieille. There is a neighbouring French port called Cap d'Ail that is near Monaco. Monaco's only natural resource is fishing; with almost the entire country being an urban area, Monaco lacks any sort of commercial agriculture industry.

A small residential expansion, Le Portier was opened in 2024, and additionally a new esplanade was added at Larvatto beach which also had some maintenance.

Many neighbourhoods are shared between Monaco, the immediately uphill French town of Beausoleil, the northeast parts of Cap-d'Ail, and the Figuièra area in Roquebrune-Cap-Martin, forming a transborder agglomeration with approximately 55,000 residents.

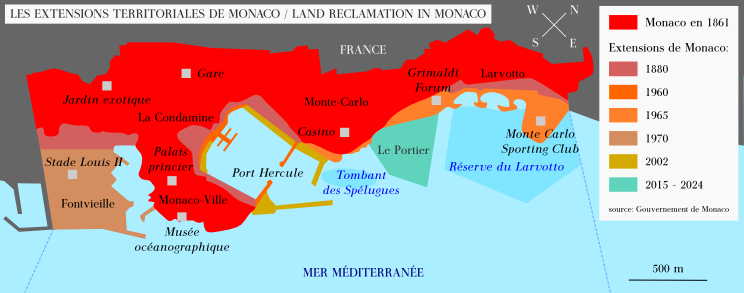
Land reclamation in Monaco since 1861

=== Climate ===
Monaco has a hot-summer Mediterranean climate (Köppen climate classification: Csa), with strong maritime influences, with some resemblances to the humid subtropical climate (Cfa). As a result, it has balmy warm, dry summers and mild, rainy winters. The winters are very mild considering the city's latitude, being as mild as locations located much further south in the Mediterranean Basin. Cool and rainy interludes can interrupt the dry summer season, the average length of which is also shorter. Summer afternoons are infrequently hot (indeed, temperatures greater than 30 °C or 86 °F are rare) as the atmosphere is temperate because of constant sea breezes. On the other hand, the nights are very mild, due to the fairly high temperature of the sea in summer. Generally, temperatures do not drop below 20 °C (68 °F) in this season. In the winter, frosts and snowfalls are extremely rare and generally occur once or twice every ten years. On 27 February 2018, both Monaco and Monte Carlo experienced snowfall.

Climate data for Monaco (1981–2010 averages, extremes 1966–present)
Month	Jan	Feb	Mar	Apr	May	Jun	Jul	Aug	Sep	Oct	Nov	Dec	Year
Record high °C (°F)	19.9 (67.8)	23.2 (73.8)	25.6 (78.1)	26.2 (79.2)	30.3 (86.5)	32.5 (90.5)	34.4 (93.9)	34.5 (94.1)	33.1 (91.6)	29.0 (84.2)	25.0 (77.0)	22.3 (72.1)	34.5 (94.1)
Mean daily maximum °C (°F)	13.0 (55.4)	13.0 (55.4)	14.9 (58.8)	16.7 (62.1)	20.4 (68.7)	23.7 (74.7)	26.6 (79.9)	26.9 (80.4)	24.0 (75.2)	20.6 (69.1)	16.5 (61.7)	13.9 (57.0)	19.2 (66.6)
Daily mean °C (°F)	10.2 (50.4)	10.2 (50.4)	12.0 (53.6)	13.8 (56.8)	17.5 (63.5)	20.9 (69.6)	23.8 (74.8)	24.2 (75.6)	21.1 (70.0)	17.9 (64.2)	13.8 (56.8)	11.2 (52.2)	16.4 (61.5)
Mean daily minimum °C (°F)	7.4 (45.3)	7.4 (45.3)	9.1 (48.4)	10.9 (51.6)	14.6 (58.3)	18.0 (64.4)	21.0 (69.8)	21.4 (70.5)	18.3 (64.9)	15.2 (59.4)	11.2 (52.2)	8.5 (47.3)	13.6 (56.5)
Record low °C (°F)	−3.1 (26.4)	−5.2 (22.6)	−3.1 (26.4)	3.8 (38.8)	7.5 (45.5)	9.0 (48.2)	10.5 (50.9)	12.4 (54.3)	10.5 (50.9)	6.5 (43.7)	1.6 (34.9)	−1.0 (30.2)	−5.2 (22.6)
Average precipitation mm (inches)	67.7 (2.67)	48.4 (1.91)	41.2 (1.62)	71.3 (2.81)	49.0 (1.93)	32.6 (1.28)	13.7 (0.54)	26.5 (1.04)	72.5 (2.85)	128.7 (5.07)	103.2 (4.06)	88.8 (3.50)	743.6 (29.28)
Average precipitation days (≥ 1.0 mm)	6.0	4.9	4.5	7.3	5.5	4.1	1.7	2.5	5.1	7.3	7.1	6.5	62.4
Average relative humidity (%)	71.0	71.6	72.6	75.6	78.7	80.5	78.8	77.0	73.8	75.9	72.0	71.3	74.9
Mean monthly sunshine hours	149.8	158.9	185.5	210.0	248.1	281.1	329.3	296.7	224.7	199.0	155.2	136.5	2,574.7
Source 1: Météo-France
Source 2: Monaco website (sun only), Weather.Directory (humidity)

Climate data for Monaco
Month	Jan	Feb	Mar	Apr	May	Jun	Jul	Aug	Sep	Oct	Nov	Dec	Year
Average sea temperature °C (°F)	13.4 (56.2)	13.0 (55.5)	13.4 (56.1)	14.6 (58.4)	18.0 (64.3)	21.8 (71.3)	23.1 (73.6)	23.6 (74.4)	22.2 (71.9)	19.6 (67.2)	17.4 (63.3)	14.9 (58.9)	17.9 (64.3)
Source: Weather Atlas

== Government and politics ==
=== Politics ===
Logo of the princely government of Monaco

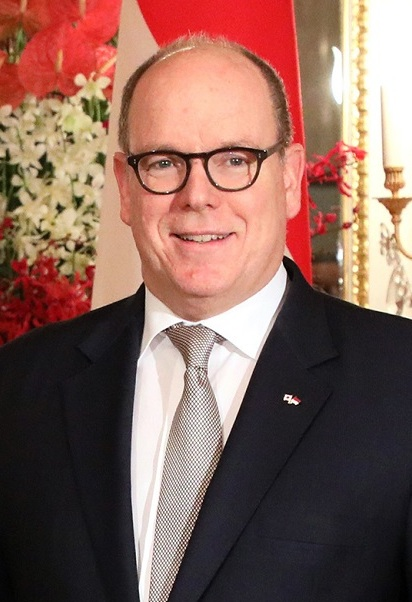
Albert II Prince of Monaco

Monaco has been governed under a constitutional monarchy since 1911, with the Sovereign Prince of Monaco as head of state. The executive branch consists of a Minister of State as the head of government, who presides over the other five members of the Council of Government. Until 2002, the Minister of State was a French citizen appointed by the prince from among candidates proposed by the Government of France; since a constitutional amendment in 2002, the Minister of State can be French or Monégasque. Since July 2025, the office is held by Christophe Mirmand.

Under the 1962 Constitution of Monaco, the prince shares his veto power with the unicameral National Council. The 24 members of the National Council are elected for five-year terms; 16 are chosen through a majority electoral system and 8 by proportional representation. All legislation requires the approval of the National Council. Following the 2023 Monegasque general election, all 24 seats are held by the pro-monarchist Monegasque National Union. The election system has often resulted in lopsided victories in terms of seats won by parties, well out of proportion with the received votes: In the 2013 Monegasque general election, the Horizon Monaco and Union Monegasque parties got 50.34% and 38.99% of the votes respectively, but got 20 and 3 seats each. Freedom House ranked Monaco 60th of 207 countries in 2024, deducting many points for having both an unelected political head of state and an unelected head of government.

The principality's city affairs are managed by the Municipality of Monaco. The municipality is directed by the Communal Council, which consists of 14 elected members and is presided over by a mayor. Georges Marsan has been mayor since 2003. Unlike the National Council, communal councillors are elected for four-year terms and are strictly non-partisan; oppositions inside the council frequently form.

Members of the judiciary of Monaco are appointed by the Sovereign Prince. Key positions within the judiciary are held by French magistrates, proposed by the Government of France. Monaco currently has three examining magistrates.

=== Administrative divisions ===
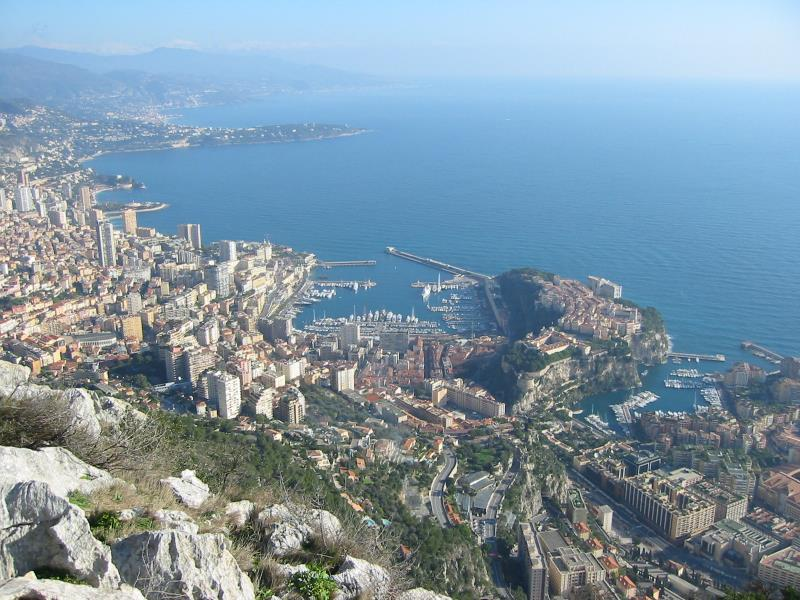
In the centre is La Condamine. At the right with the smaller harbour is Fontvieille, with The Rock (the old town, fortress, and Palace) jutting out between the two harbours. At the left are the high-rise buildings of La Rousse/Saint Roman.

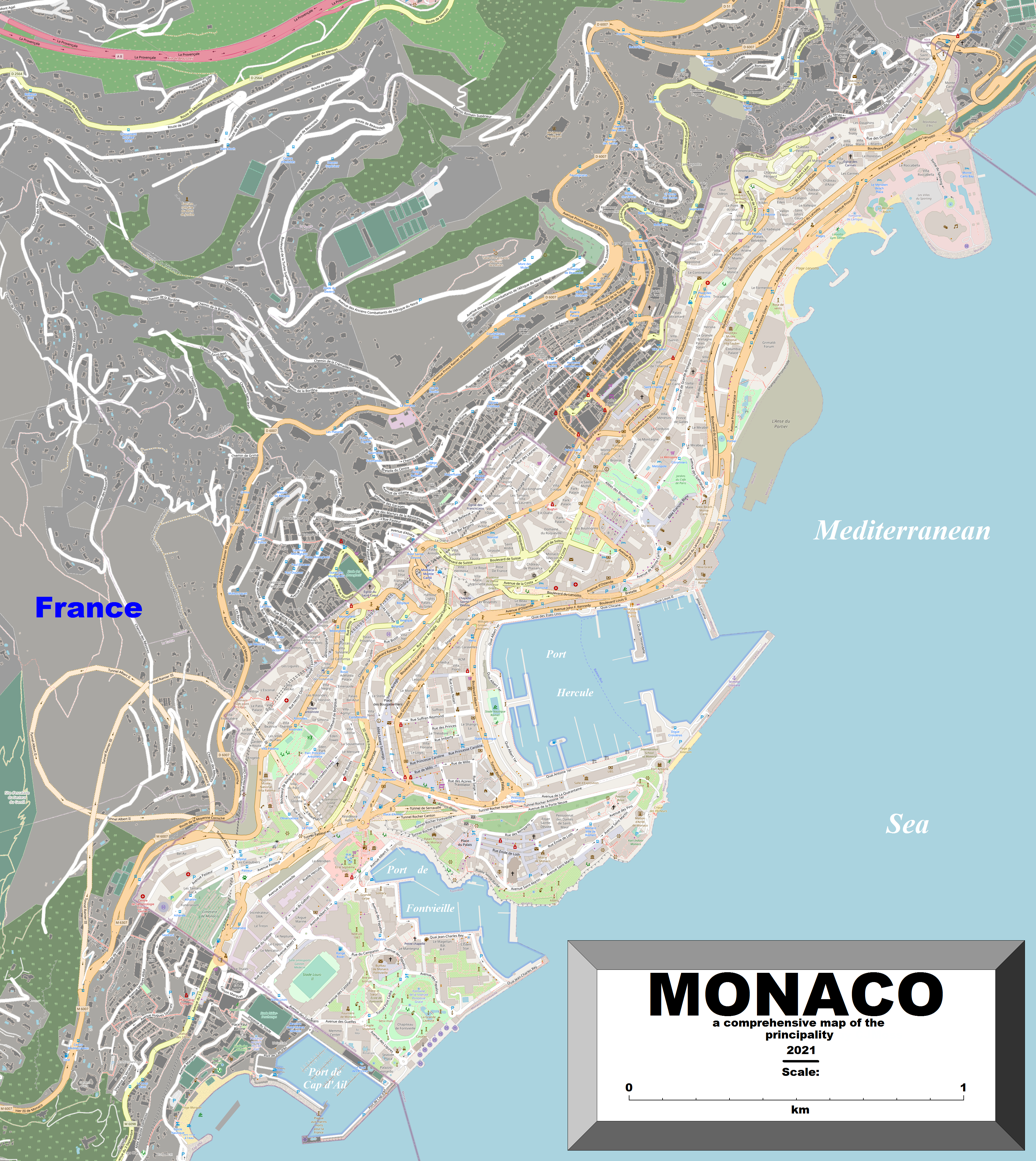
Enlargeable, detailed map of Monaco

Monaco is the second-smallest country by area in the world; only Vatican City is smaller. Monaco is the most densely populated country in the world. The state consists of only one municipality (commune), the Municipality of Monaco. There is no geographical distinction between the State and City of Monaco, although responsibilities of the government (state-level) and of the municipality (city-level) are different. According to the constitution of 1911, the principality was subdivided into three municipalities:

- Monaco-Ville, the old city and seat of government of the principality on a rocky promontory extending into the Mediterranean, known as the Rock of Monaco, or simply "The Rock";
- Monte Carlo, the principal residential and resort area with the Monte Carlo Casino in the east and northeast;
- La Condamine, the southwestern section including the port area, Port Hercules.

The municipalities were merged into one in 1917, and they were accorded the status of Wards or Quartiers thereafter.

- Fontvieille was added as a fourth ward, a newly constructed area claimed from the sea in the 1970s;
- Moneghetti became the fifth ward, created from part of La Condamine;
- Larvotto became the sixth ward, created from part of Monte Carlo;
- La Rousse/Saint Roman (including Le Ténao) became the seventh ward, also created from part of Monte Carlo.

Subsequently, three additional wards were created, but then again were dissolved in 2013:

- Saint Michel, created from part of Monte Carlo;
- La Colle, created from part of La Condamine;
- Les Révoires, also created from part of La Condamine.

Most of Saint Michel became part of Monte Carlo again in 2013. La Colle and Les Révoires were merged the same year as part of a redistricting process, where they became part of the larger Jardin Exotique ward. An additional ward was planned by new land reclamation to be settled beginning in 2014 but Prince Albert II announced in his 2009 New Year Speech that he had ended plans due to the economic climate at the time. Prince Albert II in mid-2010 firmly restarted the programme.

==== Traditional quarters and modern geographic areas ====
The four traditional quartiers of Monaco are Monaco-Ville, La Condamine, Monte Carlo and Fontvieille. The suburb of Moneghetti, the high-level part of La Condamine, is generally seen today as an effective fifth Quartier of Monaco, having a very distinct atmosphere and topography when compared with low-level La Condamine.

==== Wards ====
Wards of Monaco

For town planning purposes, a sovereign ordinance in 1966 divided the principality into reserved sectors, "whose current character must be preserved", and wards. The number and boundaries of these sectors and wards have been modified several times. The latest division dates from 2013 and created two reserved sectors and seven wards. A new 6-hectare neighbourhood, Le Portier, has been built by land reclaimed from the sea and was opened in December 2024. It was attached to the ward of Larvotto.

Wards		Area	
Wards		in ha	in %
Reserved sectors
Monaco-Ville	Secteur réservé	19.6	9.4 %
Ravin de Sainte-Dévote	Secteur réservé	2.3	1.1 %
Wards
Monte-Carlo	Quartier ordonnancé	43.7	21.0 %
Fontvieille	Quartier ordonnancé	33.0	15.8 %
La Condamine	Quartier ordonnancé	29.6	14.2 %
Larvotto	Quartier ordonnancé	27.5	13.2 %
Jardin Exotique	Quartier ordonnancé	23.5	11.3 %
La Rousse	Quartier ordonnancé	17.7	8.5 %
Les Moneghetti	Quartier ordonnancé	11.5	5.5 %
Total		208.4	100 %

Note: for statistical purposes, the Wards of Monaco are further subdivided into 178 city blocks (îlots), which are comparable to the census blocks in the United States.

- Another possibility was Fontvieille II Development to commence in 2013

=== Foreign relations ===
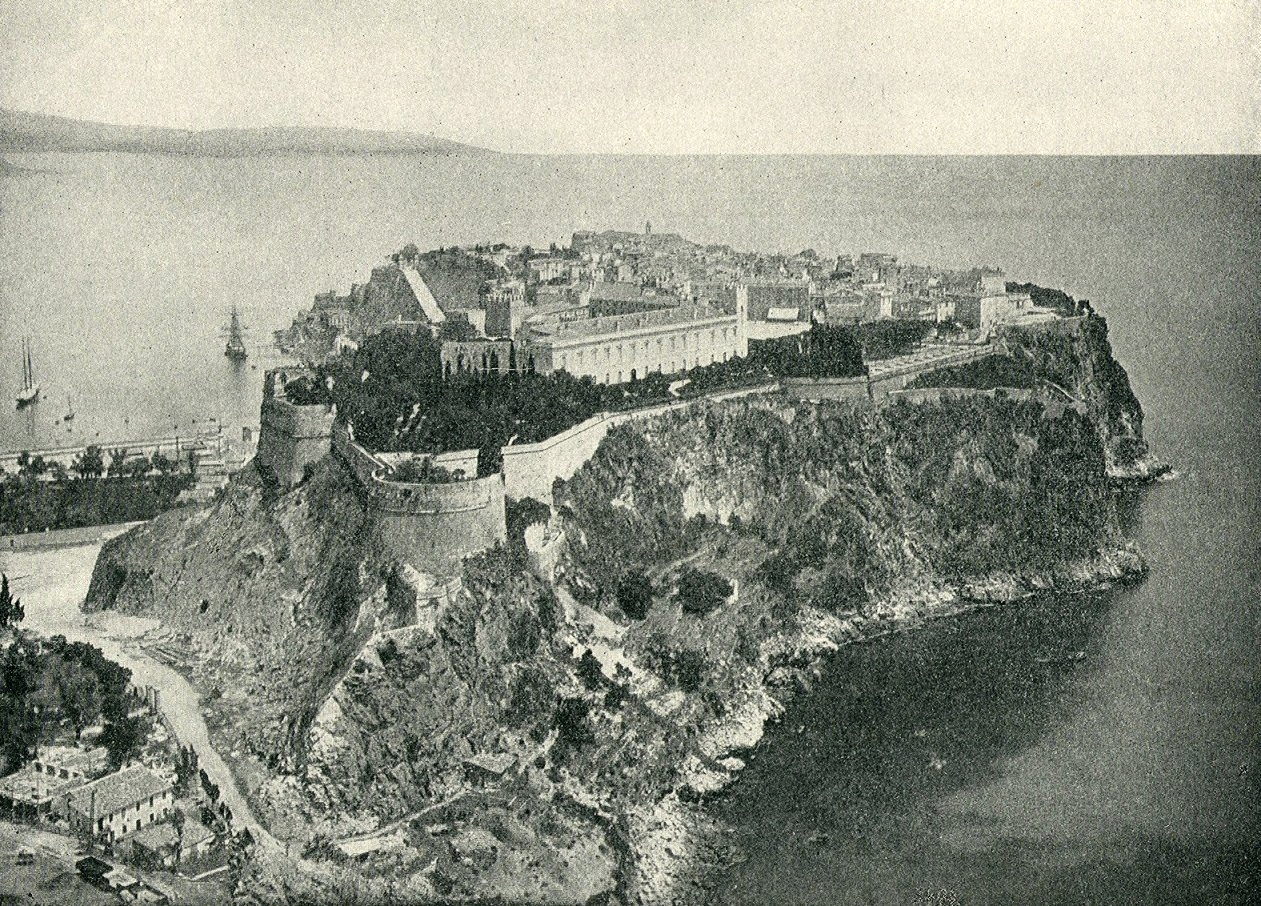
The Rock of Monaco in 1890

Honoré II, Prince of Monaco secured recognition of his independent sovereignty from Spain in 1633, and then from Louis XIII of France by the Treaty of Péronne (1641). Monaco made a special agreement with France in 1963 in which French customs laws apply in Monaco and its territorial waters. Monaco uses the euro but is not a member of the European Union. Monaco shares a 6 km (3.7 mi) border with France but also has about 2 km (1.2 mi) of coastline with the Mediterranean sea. Two important agreements that support Monaco's independence from France include the Franco-Monégasque Treaty of 1861 and the French Treaty of 1918 (see also Kingdom of Sardinia). The United States CIA Factbook records 1419 as the year of Monaco's independence.

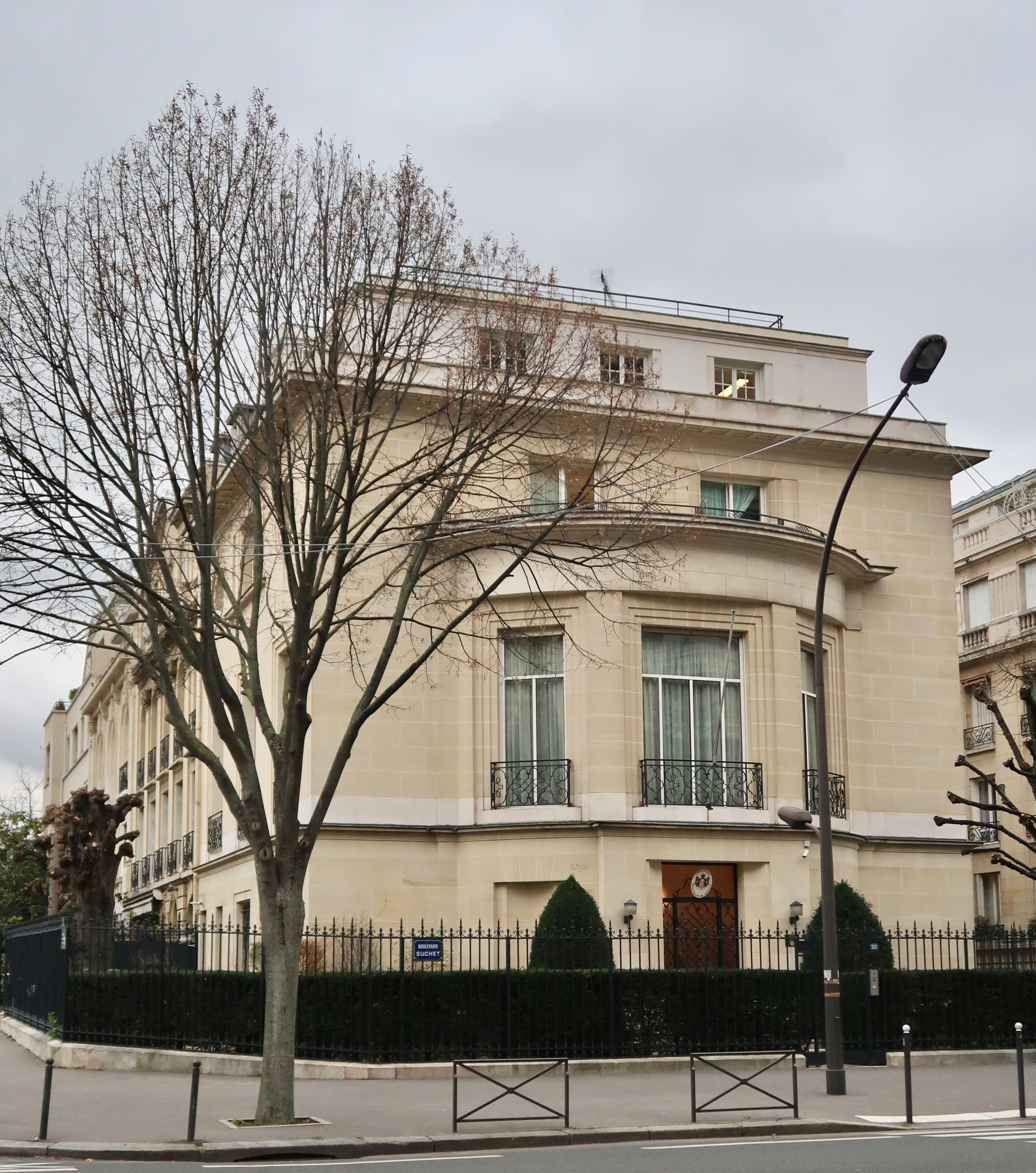
Embassy of Monaco, Paris, France

France and Italy have embassies within Monaco, while most other nations are represented via operations in Paris. There are about another 30 or so consulates. By the 21st century Monaco maintained embassies in Belgium (Brussels), France (Paris), Germany (Berlin), the Vatican, Italy (Rome), Portugal (Lisbon), Spain (Madrid), Switzerland (Bern), United Kingdom (London) and the United States (Washington).

As of 2000, nearly two-thirds of the residents of Monaco were foreigners. In 2015, the immigrant population was estimated at 60% It is reported to be difficult to gain citizenship in Monaco, or at least in relative number there are not many people who do so. In 2015, an immigration rate of about 4 people per 1,000 was noted, or about 100–150 people a year. The population of Monaco went from 35,000 in 2008 to 36,000 in 2013, and of that about 20 per cent were native Monegasque (see also Nationality law of Monaco).

A recurring issue Monaco encounters with other countries is the attempt by foreign nationals to use Monaco to avoid paying taxes in their own country. Monaco actually collects a number of taxes including a 20% VAT and 33% on companies unless they make over 75% of their income inside Monaco. Monaco does not allow dual citizenship but does have multiple paths to citizenship including by declaration and naturalisation. In many cases the key issue for obtaining citizenship, rather than attaining residency in Monaco, is the person's ties to their departure country. For example, French citizens must still pay taxes to France even if they live full-time in Monaco unless they resided in the country before 1962 for at least 5 years. In the early 1960s there was some tension between France and Monaco over taxation.

There are no border formalities entering or leaving France, and there have been no land border controls since 1963. For visitors, a souvenir passport stamp is available on request at Monaco's tourist office. This is located on the far side of the gardens that face the Casino.

Microstate	Association Agreement	Eurozone	Schengen Area	EU single market	EU customs territory	EU VAT area	Dublin Regulation
Monaco (relations)	Negotiating	Yes (Note: Monetary agreement with the EU to issue euros)	De facto (Note: Although not a contracting party to the Schengen Agreement, has an open border with France and Schengen laws are administered as if it were a part of France.)	Partial (Note: Through an agreement with France)	Yes (Note: Through an agreement with France. Part of the EU Customs territory, administered as part of France.)	Yes (Note: Also part of the EU excise territory) (Note: Through an agreement with France. Administered as a part of France for taxation purposes.)	No

==== Twin cities ====
Monaco's twin cities are:

Ostend, Belgium since 1958	Macau, China since 1992	Lucciana, Corsica, France since 2009	Campagna, Campania, Italy since 2015

=== Security and military ===
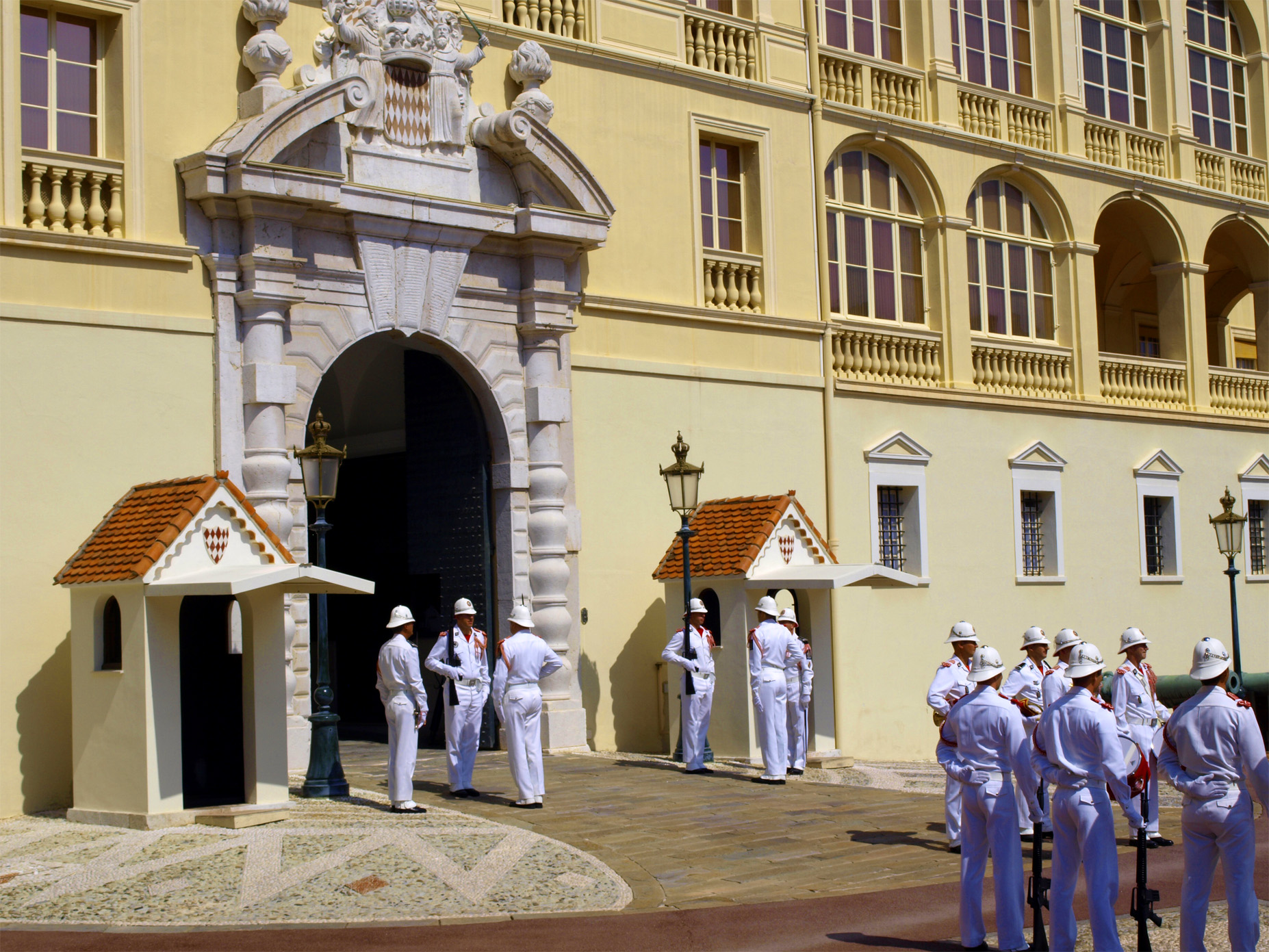
Palace guards in Monaco

The wider defence of the nation is provided by France. Monaco has no navy or air force, but on both a per-capita and per-area basis, Monaco has one of the largest police forces (515 police officers for about 38,000 people) and police presences in the world. Its police includes a special unit which operates patrol and surveillance boats jointly with the military. Police forces in Monaco are commanded by a French officer.

There is also a small military force. This consists of a bodyguard unit for the prince and his palace in Monaco-Ville called the Compagnie des Carabiniers du Prince (Prince's Company of Carabiniers); together with the militarised, armed fire and civil defence corps (Sapeurs-Pompiers) it forms Monaco's total forces. The Compagnie des Carabiniers du Prince was created by Prince Honoré IV in 1817 for the protection of the principality and the princely family. The company numbers exactly 116 officers and men; while the non-commissioned officers and soldiers are local, the officers have generally served in the French Army. In addition to their guard duties as described, the carabiniers patrol the principality's beaches and coastal waters.

== Economy ==
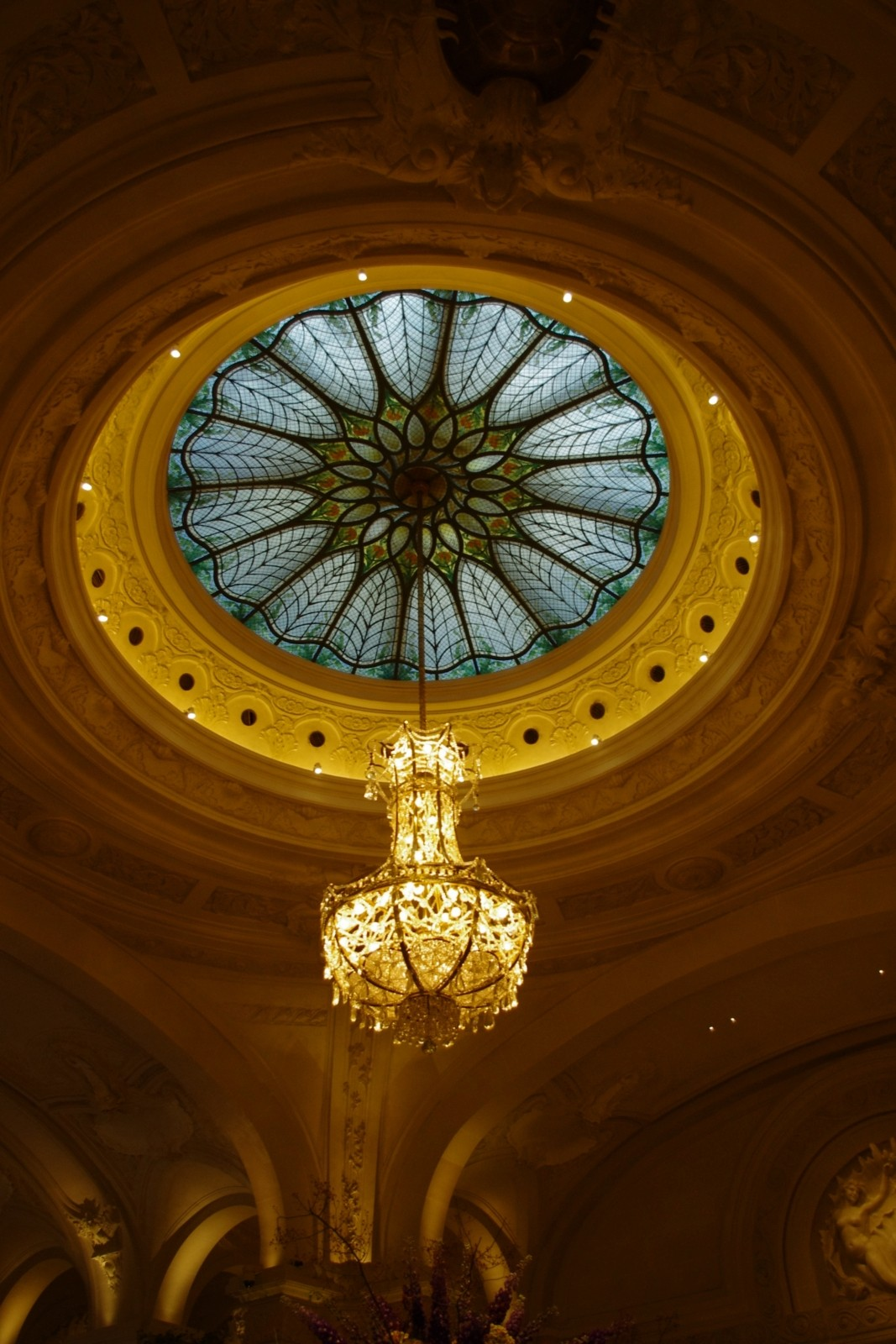
Hotel de Paris lobby ceiling: Monaco draws tourists with its late 19th- and early-20th-century buildings and glamour.

Monaco has the world's highest nominal GDP per capita at US$185,742, PPP-adjusted GDP per capita at $132,571 and GNI per capita at $183,150. It has an unemployment rate of 2%, with over 48,000 workers who commute from France and Italy each day. According to the CIA World Factbook, Monaco has the world's lowest poverty rate and the highest number of millionaires and billionaires per capita in the world. For the fourth year in a row, Monaco in 2012 had the world's most expensive real estate market, at $58,300 per square metre. Although the average price went down in 2020, to an average price of $53,378 per square metre, Monaco remains one of the most expensive places in the world to buy property. By 2024, Monaco allows Visa-free travel from 86 countries around the world.

The world's most expensive apartment is located in Monaco, a penthouse at the Odeon Tower valued at $335 million according to Forbes in 2016.

The state retains monopolies in numerous sectors, including tobacco and the postal service. The telephone network (Monaco Telecom) used to be fully owned by the state. Its monopoly now comprises only 45%, while the remaining 55% is owned by Cable & Wireless Communications (49%) and Compagnie Monégasque de Banque (6%). Living standards are high, roughly comparable to those in prosperous French metropolitan areas.

Fontvieille and its harbour

Monaco is not a member of the European Union, but is very closely linked via a customs union with France. As such, its currency is the same as that of France, the euro. Before 2002, Monaco minted its own coinage, the Monégasque franc. Monaco has acquired the right to mint euro coins with Monegasque designs on its national side.

Monaco has become a major banking centre, holding over €100 billion worth of funds. Banks in Monaco specialise in providing private banking, asset and wealth management services. The principality has successfully sought to diversify its economic base into services and small, high-value-added, non-polluting industries, such as cosmetics.

=== Tourism ===
Tourist arrivals of 2024 in %

One of Monaco's main sources of income is tourism. Each year many foreigners are attracted to its casinos and pleasant climate. In 2022 there were about 300,000 international tourist arrivals. Monaco is the only place in Europe where credit card points are not redeemable. Hotel points are not able to be accumulated nor are transactions recorded, allowing for an increase in privacy that is sought by many of the locals.

=== Gambling industry ===
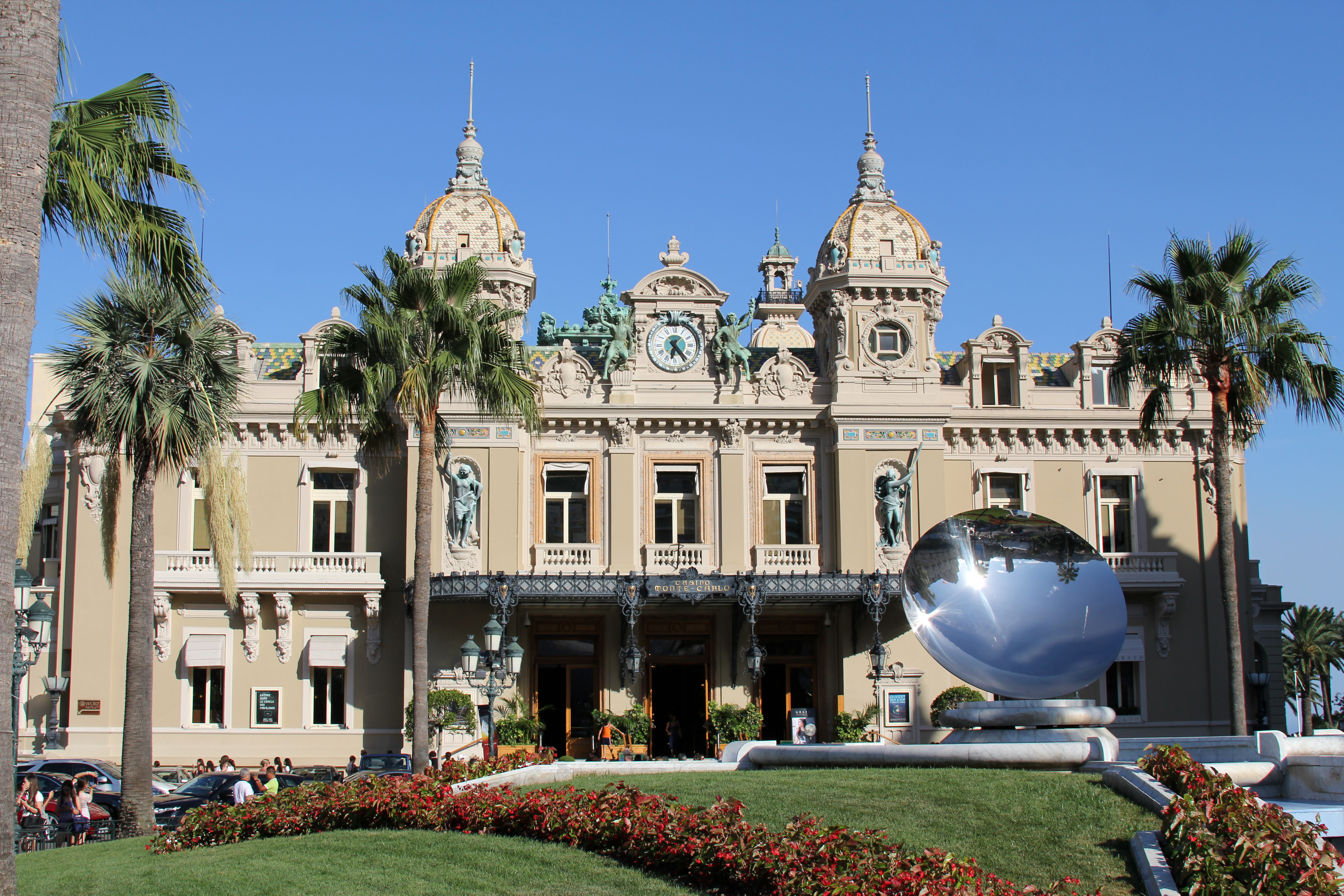
Monte Carlo Casino

The plan for casino gambling was drafted during the reign of Florestan I in 1846. Under Louis-Philippe's petite-bourgeois regime a dignitary such as the Prince of Monaco was not allowed to operate a gambling house. All this changed in the dissolute Second French Empire under Napoleon III. The House of Grimaldi was in dire need of money.

The towns of Menton and Roquebrune, which had been the main sources of income for the Grimaldi family for centuries, were now accustomed to a much-improved standard of living and lenient taxation thanks to the Sardinian intervention and clamoured for financial and political concession, even for separation. The Grimaldi family hoped the newly legal industry would help alleviate the difficulties they faced, above all the crushing debt the family had incurred, but Monaco's first casino would not be ready to operate until after Charles III assumed the throne in 1856.

The grantee of the princely concession (licence) was unable to attract enough business to sustain the operation and, after relocating the casino several times, sold the concession to French casino magnates François and Louis Blanc for 1.7 million francs.

The Blancs had already set up a highly successful casino (in fact the largest in Europe) in Bad-Homburg in the Grand Duchy of Hesse-Homburg, a small German principality comparable to Monaco, and quickly petitioned Charles III to rename a depressed seaside area known as "Les Spelugues (Den of Thieves)" to "Monte Carlo (Mount Charles)." They then constructed their casino in the newly dubbed "Monte Carlo" and cleared out the area's less-than-savoury elements to make the neighbourhood surrounding the establishment more conducive to tourism.

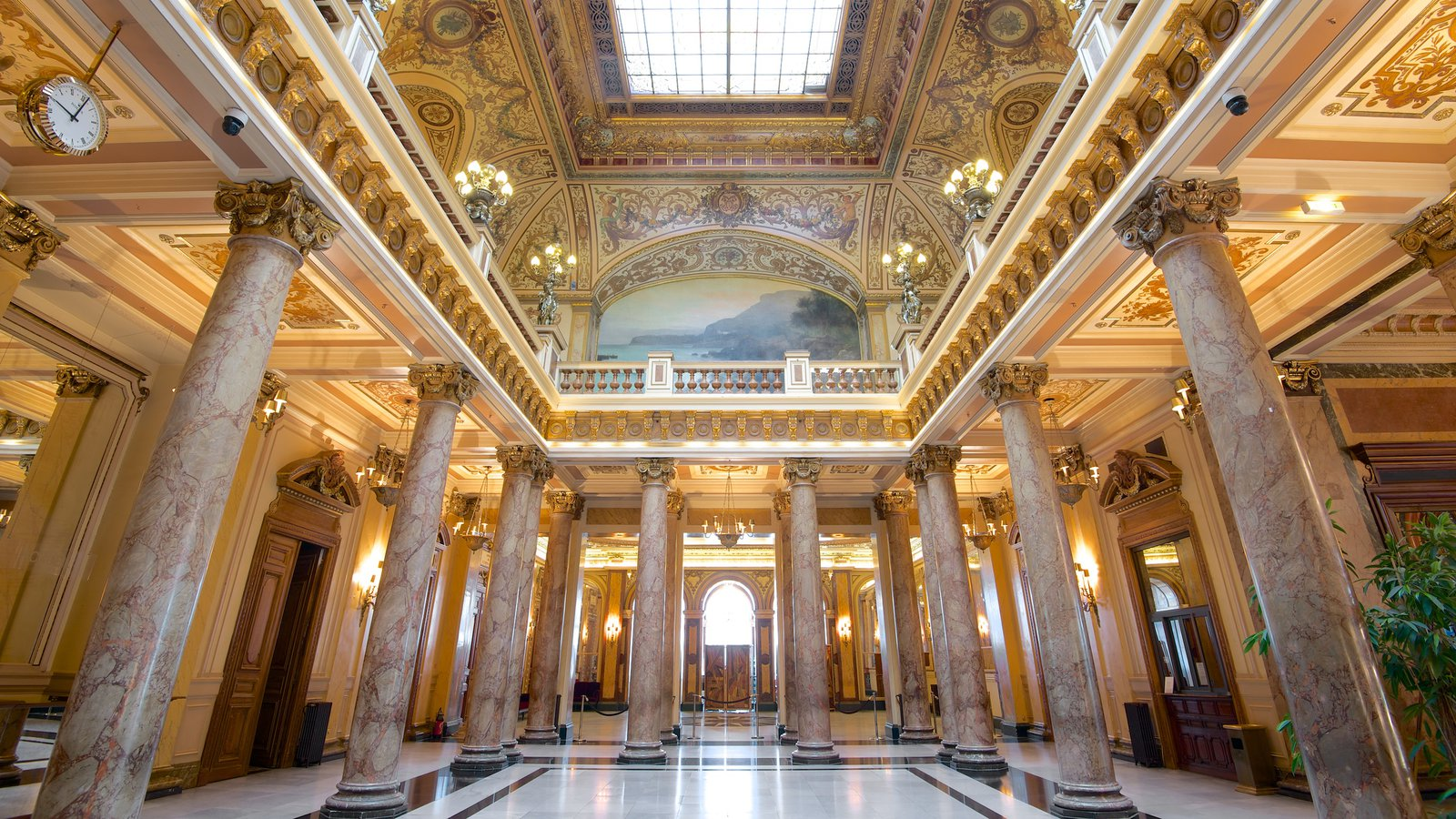
Atrium in Monte Carlo Casino

The Blancs opened Le Grand Casino de Monte Carlo in 1858 and the casino benefited from the tourist traffic the newly built French railway system created. Due to the combination of the casino and the railroads, Monaco finally recovered from the previous half-century of economic slump and the principality's success attracted other businesses. In the years following the casino's opening, Monaco founded its Oceanographic Museum and the Monte Carlo Opera House, 46 hotels were built and the number of jewellers operating in Monaco increased by nearly five-fold. In an apparent effort not to overtax citizens, it was decreed that the Monégasque citizens were prohibited from entering the casino unless they were employees. By 1869, the casino was making such a vast sum of money that the principality could afford to end tax collection from the Monegasques—a masterstroke that was to attract affluent residents from all over Europe in a policy that still exists today.

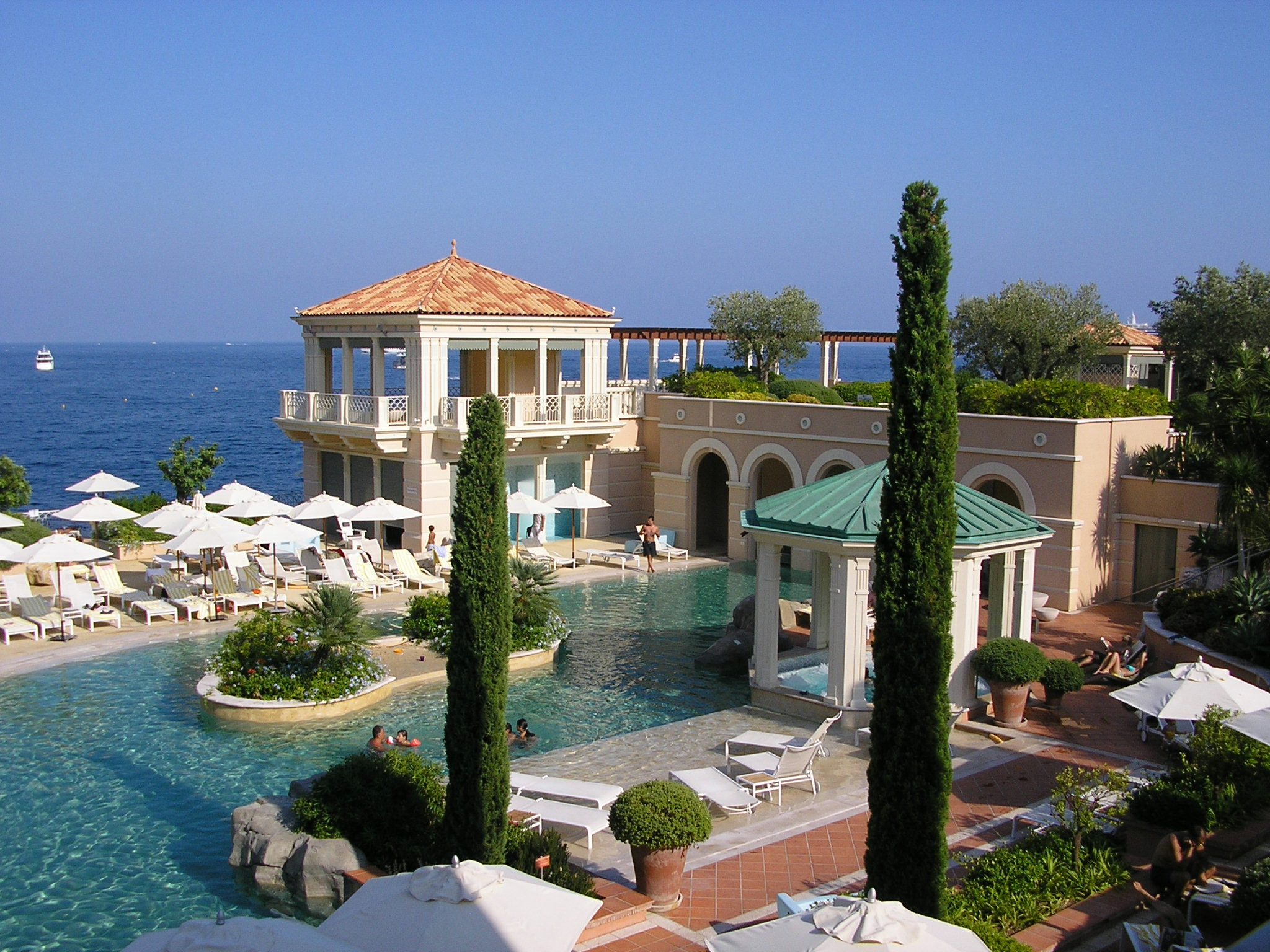
Monte-Carlo Bay Hotel & Resort overlooks the Mediterranean Sea.

Today, Société des bains de mer de Monaco, which owns Le Grand Casino, still operates in the original building that the Blancs constructed and has since been joined by several other casinos, including the Le Casino Café de Paris, the Monte Carlo Sporting Club & Casino and the Sun Casino. The most recent addition in Monte Carlo is the Monte Carlo Bay Casino, which sits on 4 hectares of the Mediterranean Sea; among other things, it offers 145 slot machines, all equipped with "ticket-in, ticket-out" (TITO). It is the first Mediterranean casino to use this technology.

=== Low taxes ===
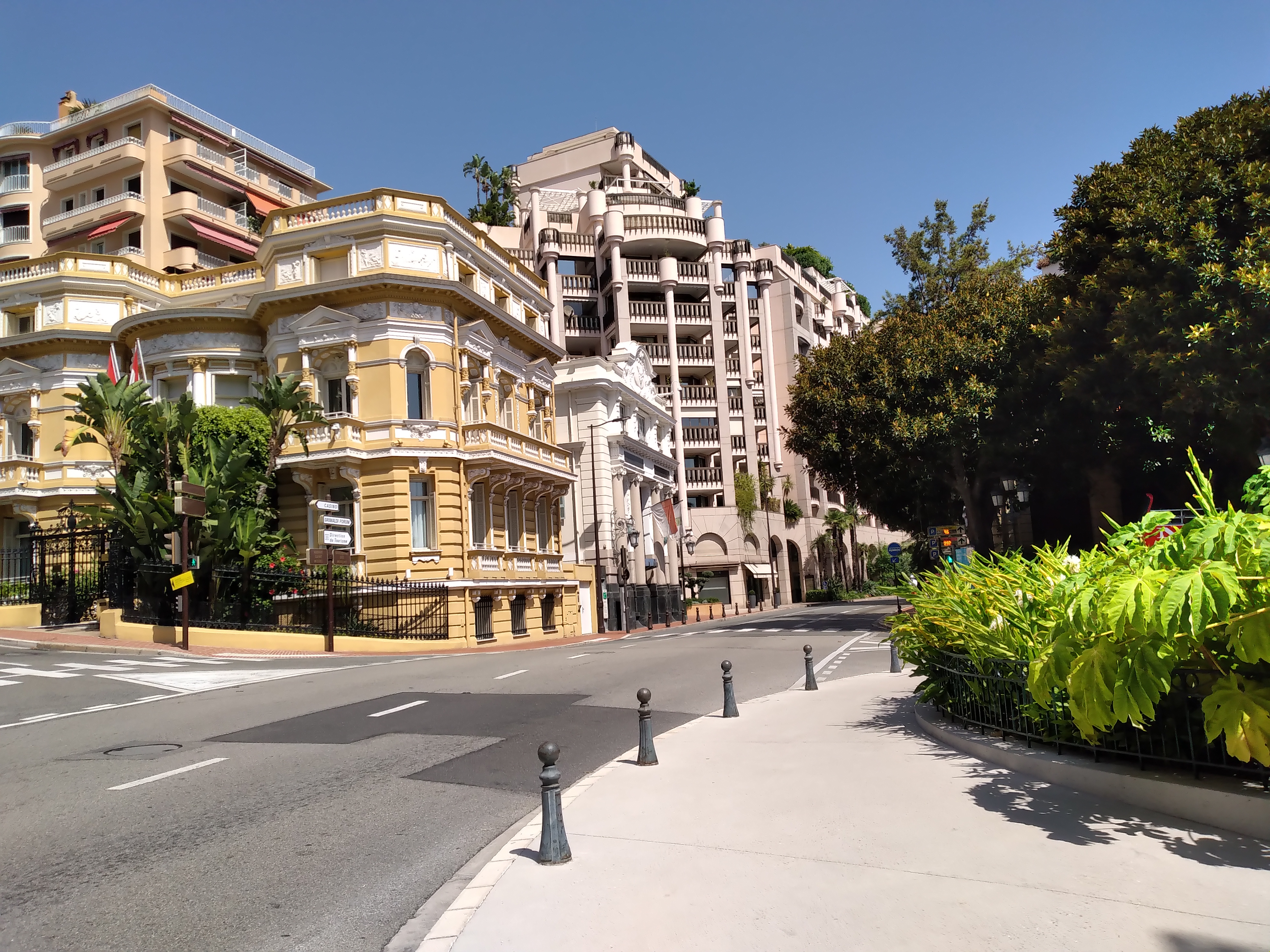
Boulevard des Moulins meets Avenue Saint-Michel.

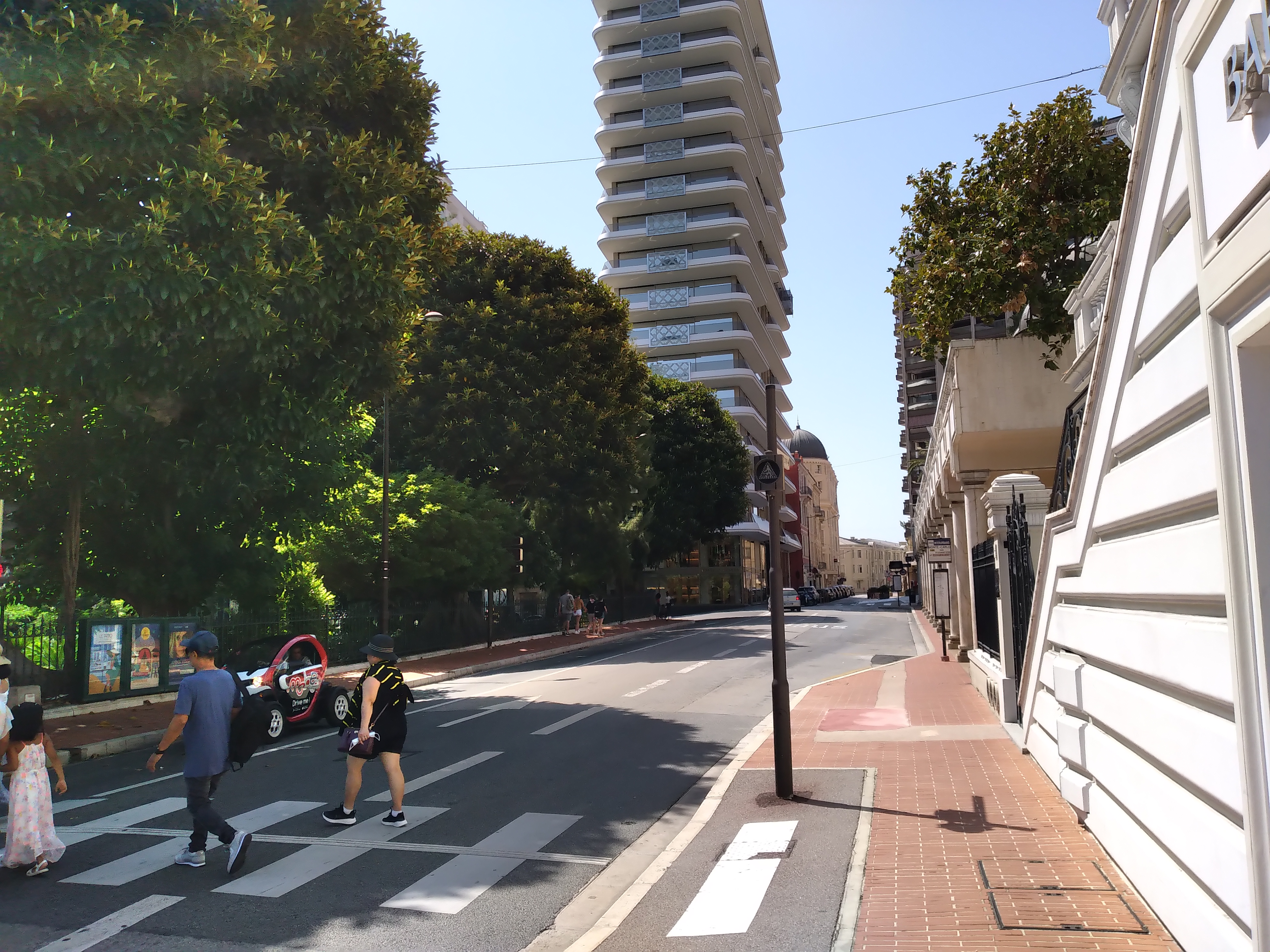
Pedestrian crossing on Avenue de la Costa

Monaco has a 20% VAT plus high social-insurance taxes, payable by both employers and employees. The employers' contributions are between 28% and 40% (averaging 35%) of gross salary, including benefits, and employees pay a further 10% to 14% (averaging 13%).

Monaco has never levied income tax on individuals, and foreigners are thus able to use it as a "tax haven" from their own country's high taxes, because as an independent country, Monaco is not obliged to pay taxes to other countries.

The absence of a personal income tax has attracted many wealthy "tax refugee" residents from European countries, who derive the majority of their income from activity outside Monaco. Celebrities, such as Formula One drivers, attract most of the attention but the vast majority are lesser-known business people.

Per a bilateral treaty with France, French citizens who reside in Monaco must still pay income and wealth taxes to France. The principality also actively discourages the registration of foreign corporations, charging a 33 per cent corporation tax on profits unless they can show that at least three-quarters of turnover is generated within Monaco. Unlike classic tax havens, Monaco does not offer offshore financial services.

In 1998, the Centre for Tax Policy and Administration, part of the Organisation for Economic Co-operation and Development (OECD), issued a first report on the consequences of the financial systems of known tax havens. Monaco did not appear in the list of these territories until 2004, when the OECD became indignant regarding the Monegasque situation and denounced it in a report, along with Andorra, Liechtenstein, Liberia, and the Marshall Islands. The report underlined Monaco's lack of co-operation regarding financial information disclosure and availability. Later, Monaco overcame the OECD's objections and was removed from the "grey list" of uncooperative jurisdictions. In 2009, Monaco went a step further and secured a place on the "white list" after signing twelve information exchange treaties with other jurisdictions.

In 2000, the Financial Action Task Force on Money Laundering (FATF) stated: "The anti-money laundering system in Monaco is comprehensive. Difficulties have been encountered with Monaco by countries in international investigations on serious crimes that appear to be linked also with tax matters. In addition, the FIU of Monaco (SICCFIN) suffers a great lack of adequate resources. The authorities of Monaco have stated that they will provide additional resources to SICCFIN."

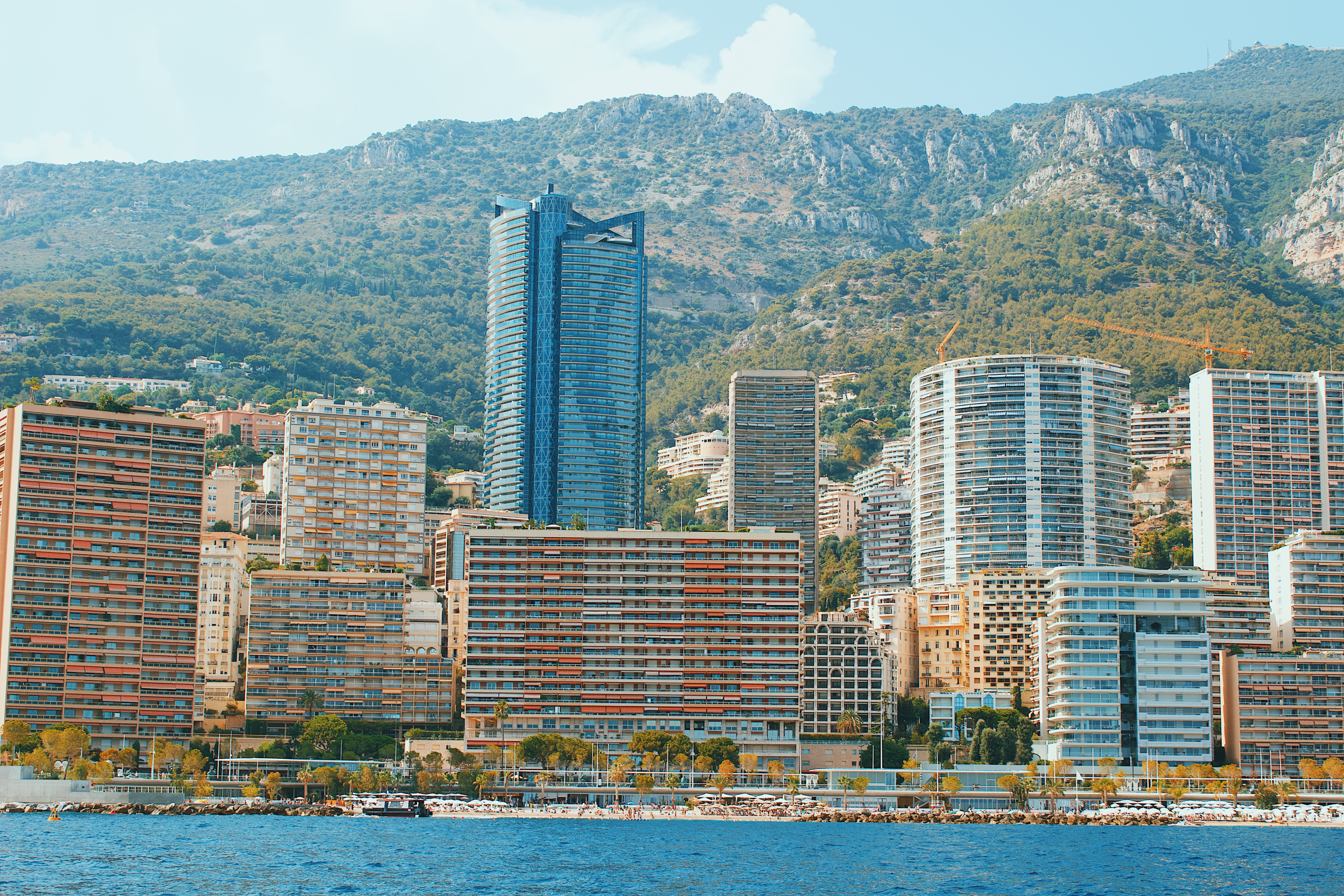
Tall buildings in Monaco

Also in 2000, a report by French politicians Arnaud Montebourg and Vincent Peillon stated that Monaco had relaxed policies with respect to money laundering including within its casino and that the Government of Monaco had been placing political pressure on the judiciary so that alleged crimes were not being properly investigated. In its Progress Report of 2005, the International Monetary Fund (IMF) identified Monaco, along with 36 other territories, as a tax haven, but in its FATF report of the same year it took a positive view of Monaco's measures against money-laundering.

The Council of Europe also decided to issue reports naming tax havens. Twenty-two territories, including Monaco, were thus evaluated between 1998 and 2000 on a first round. Monaco was the only territory that refused to perform the second round, between 2001 and 2003, whereas the 21 other territories had planned to implement the third and final round, planned between 2005 and 2007.

In June 2024, the FATF added Monaco to its "grey list", which includes countries needing "increased monitoring" due to statewide issues of money laundering and terrorist financing.

=== Numismatics ===
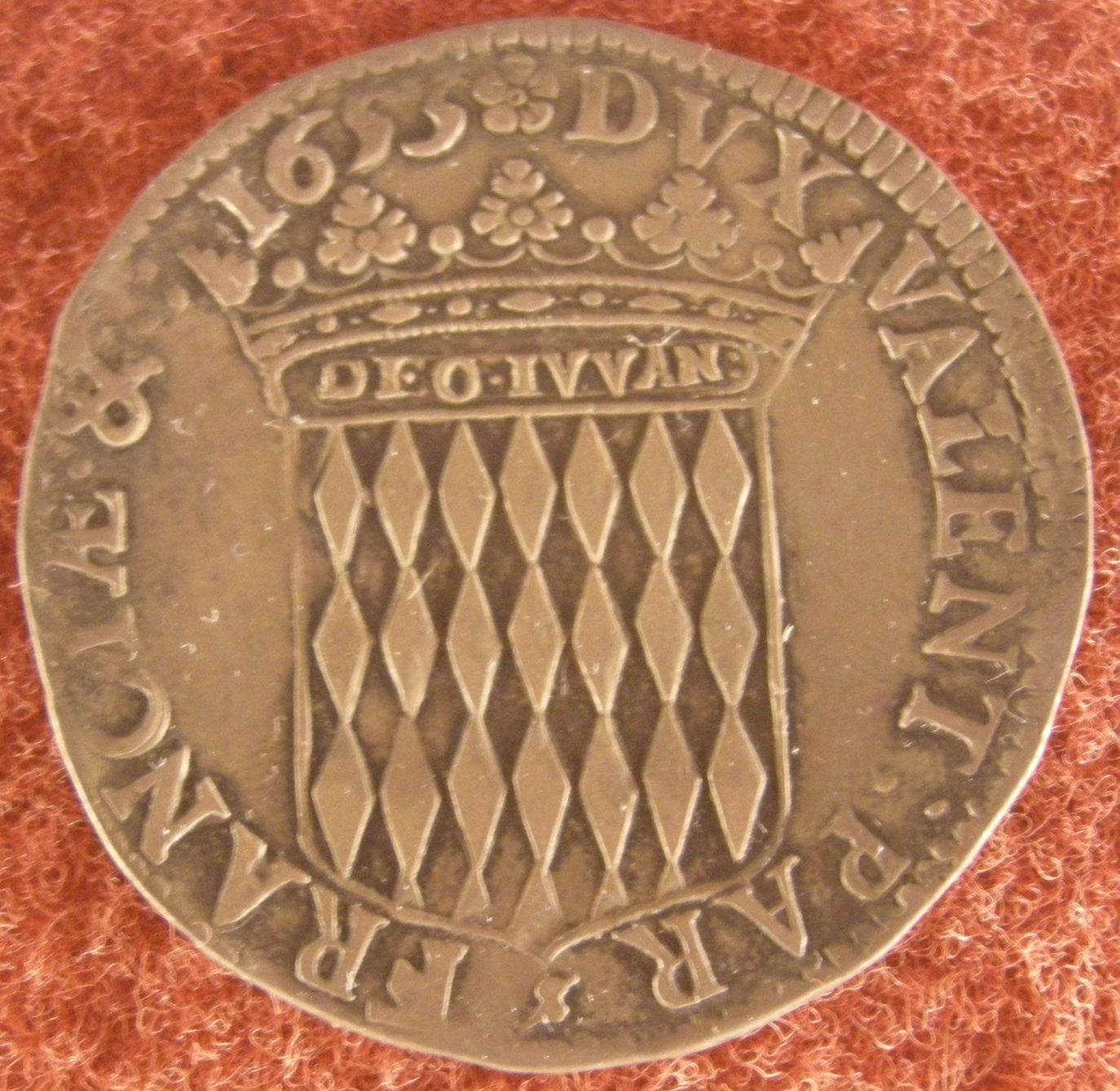
Genovese coin from 1655

Monaco issued its own coins in various devaluations connected to the écu already in the seventeenth century, but its first decimal coins of the Monégasque franc were issued in 1837 continued until 2001.

Although Monaco is not a European Union member, it is allowed to use the euro as its currency by arrangement with the Council of the European Union; it is also granted the right to use its own designs on the national side of the euro coins, which was introduced in 2002. In preparation for this date, the minting of the new euro coins started as early as 2001. Like Belgium, Finland, France, the Netherlands, and Spain, Monaco decided to put the minting date on its coins. This is why the first euro coins from Monaco have the year 2001 on them, instead of 2002, like the other countries of the Eurozone that decided to put the year of first circulation (2002) on their coins. Three different designs were selected for the Monégasque coins. The design was changed in 2006 after Prince Rainier's death to feature the effigy of Prince Albert.

=== Transport ===
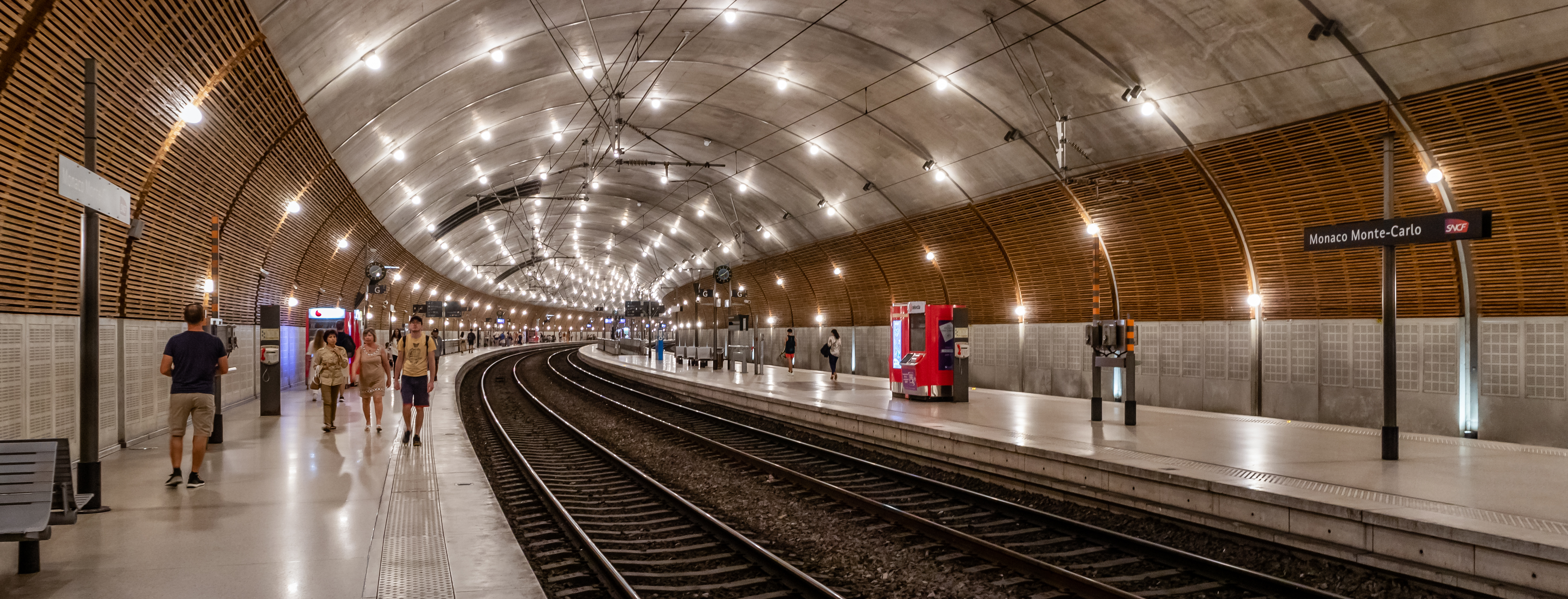
Monaco Monte Carlo station

One of the most important modes of local transportation is walking, and the city is expanding its pedestrian network in the 2020s to be more pedestrian friendly. This includes plans for a new pedestrian bridge in Fontvieille that connects to the new Wurtemberg footbridge.

The Monaco-Monte Carlo station on the Marseille–Ventimiglia railway is served by the SNCF, the French national rail system. The train station is the only one in Monaco, and connects the City-State by rail to French cities along the Riveria such as Nice (and its Nice Côte d'Azur Airport a little under an hour away from Monaco), Cannes, and Marseille (and to a transit point just east of the France-Italy border at Ventimiglia) and high-speed TGV trains connect to more distant locations such as Paris: a gateway to the rest of Europe. The current station is built partly underground and was opened in 1999.

The Monaco Heliport provides helicopter service to the closest airport, Côte d'Azur Airport in Nice, France. The heliport its located in the southwestern edge of Monaco.

The Monaco bus company, Compagnie des Autobus de Monaco (CAM), covers all the tourist attractions, museums, exotic garden, business centres, the Casino, and Stade Louis II.

There are about 77 km (48 miles) of roads in Monaco, many sections of which are also used for automotive and other races. The nearest 4-lane major motorway, the European route E80, passes well clear to the north of the border, and curvy mountain roads connect its ramps to Monaco.

== Demographics ==
Population of Monaco by nationality (2024)
1. Monégasque (24.1%)
2. French (21.8%)
3. Italian (19.5%)
4. British (7.60%)
5. Swiss (3.10%)
6. Russian (3.10%)
7. Belgian (2.70%)
8. German (2.50%)
9. Other (13.0%)

Monaco's total population was 38,400 in 2015, and estimated by the United Nations to be 36,297 as of 1 July 2023. As of 2024, Monégasques make up 24.1% of residents, followed by French (21.8%), Italian (19.5%), British (7.6%), Swiss (3.1%), Russian (3.1%), Belgian (2.7%), and German nationals (2.5%). According to 2019 studies, 31% of Monaco's population is reported to be millionaires equalling up to 12,248 individuals.

Citizens of Monaco, whether born in the country or naturalised, are called Monégasque. Monaco has the world's highest life expectancy at nearly 90 years.

=== Language ===
The main and official language of Monaco is French, while Italian is spoken by the principality's sizeable community from Italy. French and Italian are in fact more spoken in the principality today than Monégasque, its historic vernacular language. A variety of Ligurian, Monégasque is not recognised as an official language; nevertheless, some signage appears in both French and Monégasque, and the language is taught in schools. English is also used.

Italian was the official language in Monaco until 1860, when it was replaced by French. This was due to the annexation of the surrounding County of Nice to France following the Treaty of Turin (1860).

The Grimaldi, princes of Monaco, are of Ligurian origin; thus, the traditional national language is Monégasque, a variety of Ligurian, now spoken by only a minority of residents and as a common second language by many native residents. In Monaco-Ville, street signs are printed in both French and Monégasque.

=== Religion ===
Religion in Monaco according to the Global Religious Landscape survey by the Pew Forum, 2012
1. Christianity (86.0%)
2. Unaffiliated (11.7%)
3. Judaism (1.70%)
4. Islam (0.40%)
5. Other religions (0.20%)

Christians comprise a total of 86% of Monaco's population.

According to Monaco 2012 International Religious Freedom Report, Roman Catholics are Monaco's largest religious group, followed by Protestant Christians. The Report states that there is a Greek Orthodox church and two Protestant churches, an Anglican church and a Reformed church. There are also various other Evangelical Protestant communities that gather periodically.

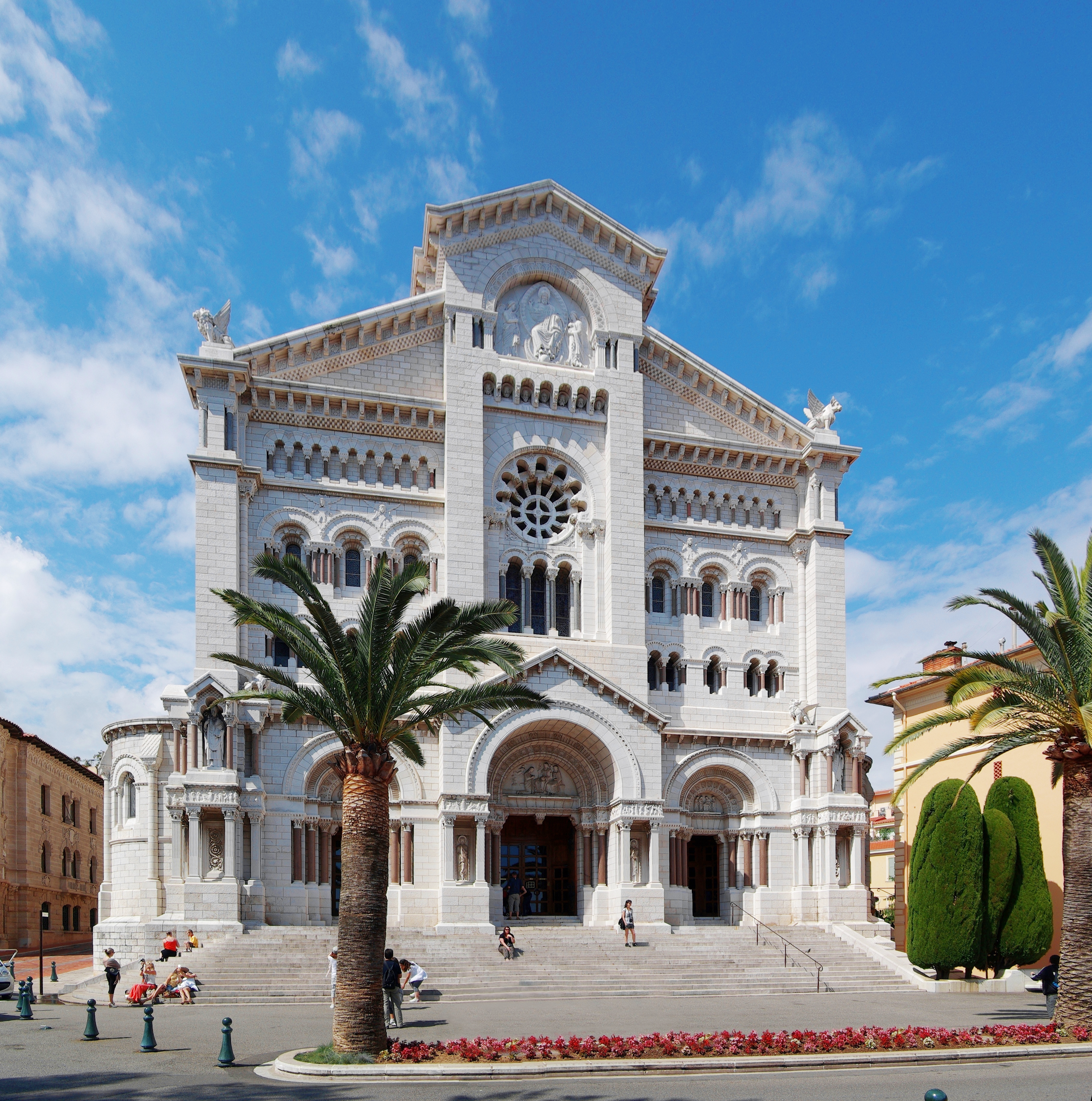
Cathedral of Our Lady Immaculate

The official religion is Catholicism, with freedom of other religions guaranteed by the constitution. There are five Roman Catholic parish churches in Monaco and one cathedral, which is the seat of the archbishop of Monaco.

The diocese, which has existed since the mid-19th century, was raised to a non-metropolitan archbishopric in 1981 as the Archdiocese of Monaco and remains exempt (i.e. immediately subject to the Holy See). The patron saint is Saint Devota.

Monaco's 2012 International Religious Freedom Report states that there is one Greek Orthodox church in Monaco. The Russian Orthodox Parish of the Holy Royal Martyrs meets in the Reformed Church's Rue Louis Notari building.

There is one Anglican church (St Paul's Church), located in the Avenue de Grande Bretagne in Monte Carlo. The church was dedicated in 1925. In 2007 this had a formal membership of 135 Anglican residents in the principality but was also serving a considerably larger number of Anglicans temporarily in the country, mostly as tourists. The church site also accommodates an English-language library of over 3,000 books. The church is part of the Anglican Diocese in Europe.

There is one Reformed church, which meets in a building located in Rue Louis Notari. The building dates from 1958 to 1959. The church is affiliated with the United Protestant Church of France (Église Protestante Unie de France, EPUF), a group that incorporates the former Reformed Church of France (Église Réformée de France). Through this affiliation with EPUF, the church is part of the World Communion of Reformed Churches. The church acts as a host church to some other Christian communities, allowing them to use its building.

The Monaco Parish of the Charismatic Episcopal Church (Parish of St Joseph) dates from 2017 and meets in the Reformed Church's Rue Louis Notari building.

The Muslim population of Monaco consists of about 280 people, most of whom are residents, not citizens. The majority of the Muslim population of Monaco are Arabs, though there is a Turkish minority as well. Monaco does not have any official mosques. According to the Monaco Statistics database (IMSEE), there are around 100 Hindus living in the country.

The Association Culturelle Israélite de Monaco (founded in 1948) is a converted house containing a synagogue, a community Hebrew school, and a kosher food shop, located in Monte Carlo. The community mainly consists of retirees from Britain (40%) and North Africa. Half of the Jewish population is Sephardic, mainly from North Africa, while the other half is Ashkenazi.

=== Education ===
==== Primary and secondary schools ====
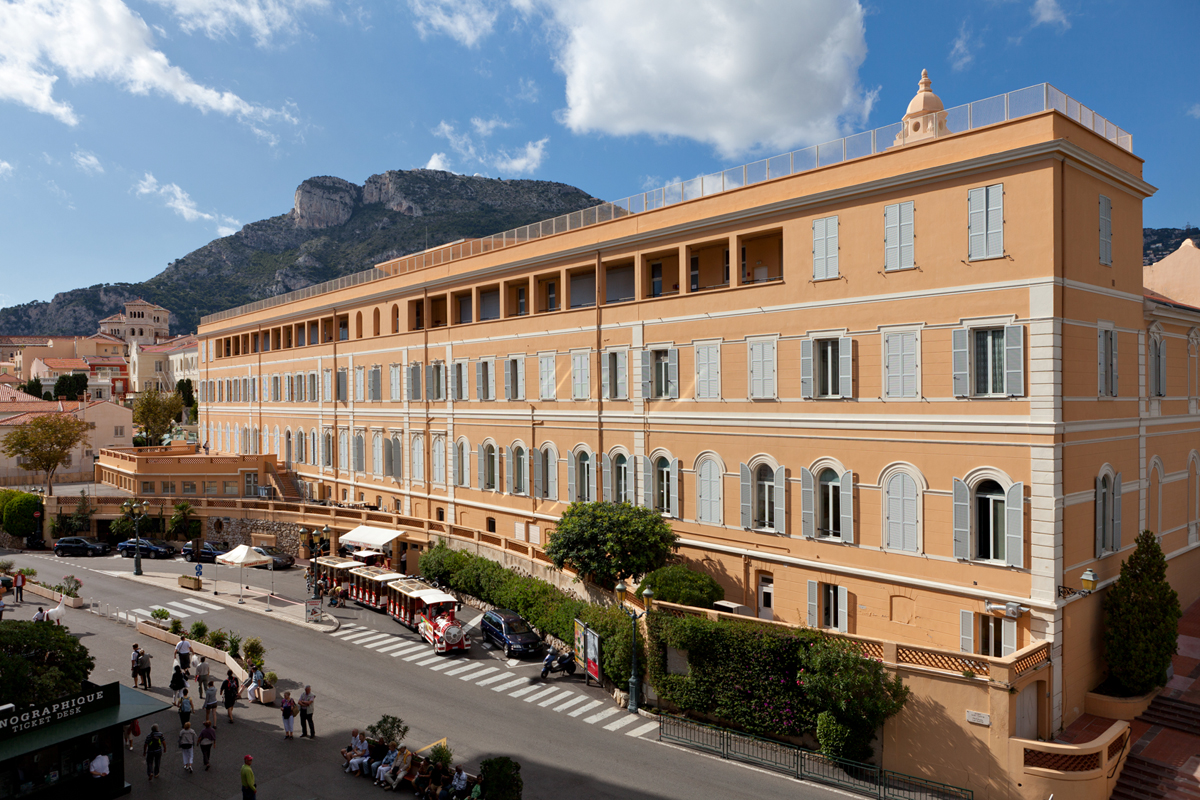
Lycée Albert Premier of Monaco

Monaco has ten state-operated schools, including: seven nursery and primary schools; one secondary school, Collège Charles III; one lycée that provides general and technological training, Lycée Albert 1er; and one lycée that provides vocational and hotel training, Lycée technique et hôtelier de Monte-Carlo. There are also two grant-aided denominational private schools, Institution François d'Assise Nicolas Barré and École des Sœurs Dominicaines, and one international school, the International School of Monaco, founded in 1994.

==== Colleges and universities ====
There is one university located in Monaco, namely the International University of Monaco (IUM), an English-language university specialising in business education and operated by the Institut des hautes études économiques et commerciales (INSEEC) group.

== Culture ==
=== Architecture ===
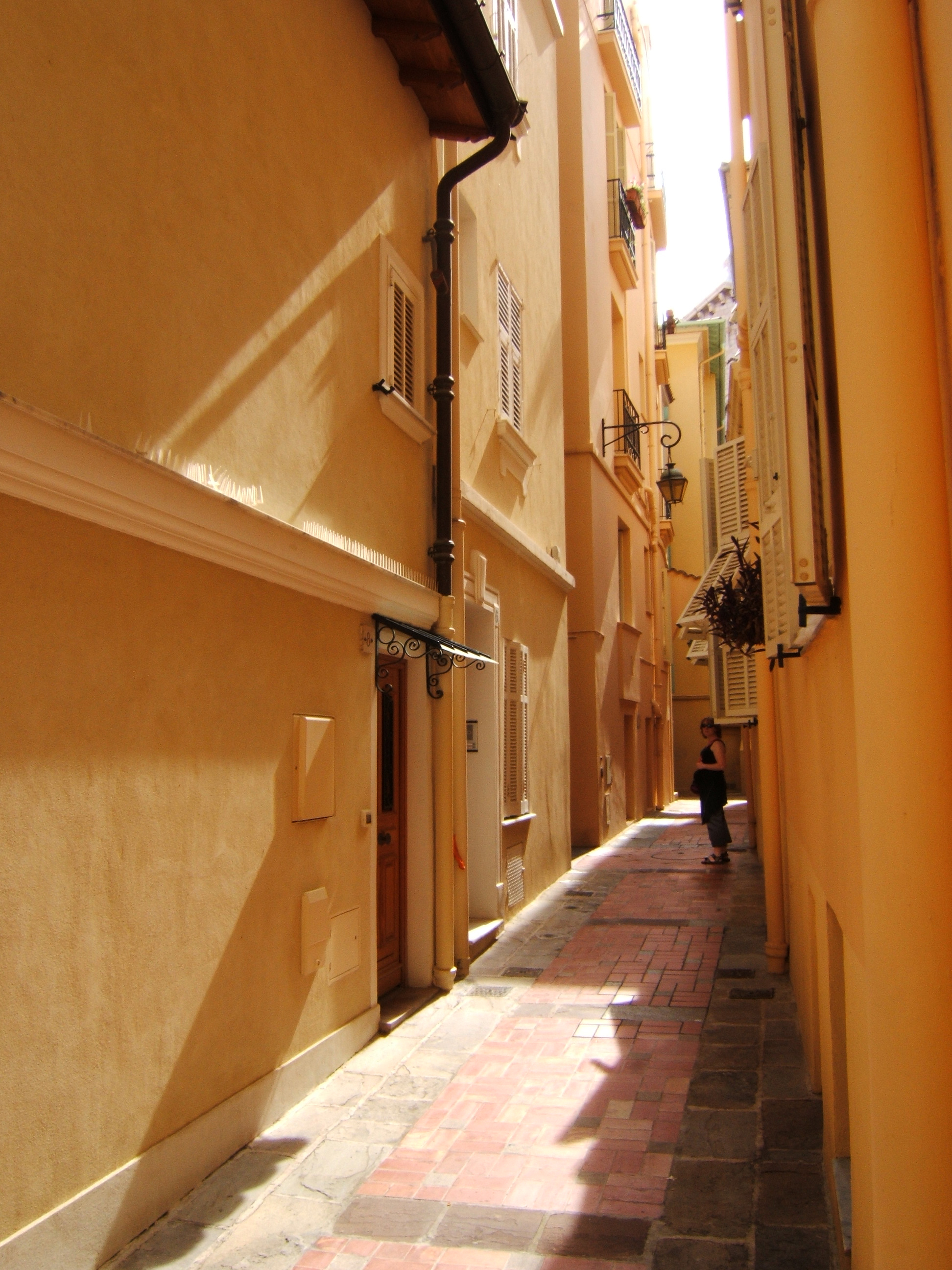
Ville ruelle in Monaco

Monaco exhibits a wide range of architecture, but the principality's signature style, particularly in Monte Carlo, is that of the Belle Époque. It finds its most florid expression in the 1878–9 Casino and the Salle Garnier created by Charles Garnier and Jules Dutrou. Decorative elements include turrets, balconies, pinnacles, multi-coloured ceramics, and caryatids. These were blended to create a picturesque fantasy of pleasure and luxury, and an alluring expression of how Monaco sought and still seeks, to portray itself. This capriccio of French, Italian, and Spanish elements were incorporated into hacienda villas and apartments. Following major development in the 1970s, Prince Rainier III banned high-rise development in the principality. His successor, Prince Albert II, overturned this Sovereign Order. In recent years the accelerating demolition of Monaco's architectural heritage, including its single-family villas, has created dismay. The principality has no heritage protection legislation.

=== Visual arts ===
Monaco has a national museum of contemporary visual art at the New National Museum of Monaco. In 1997, the Audiovisual Institute of Monaco was founded aimed to preserve audiovisual archives and show how the Principality of Monaco is represented in cinema. The country also has numerous works of public art, statues, museums, and memorials (see list of public art in Monaco).

=== Museums ===
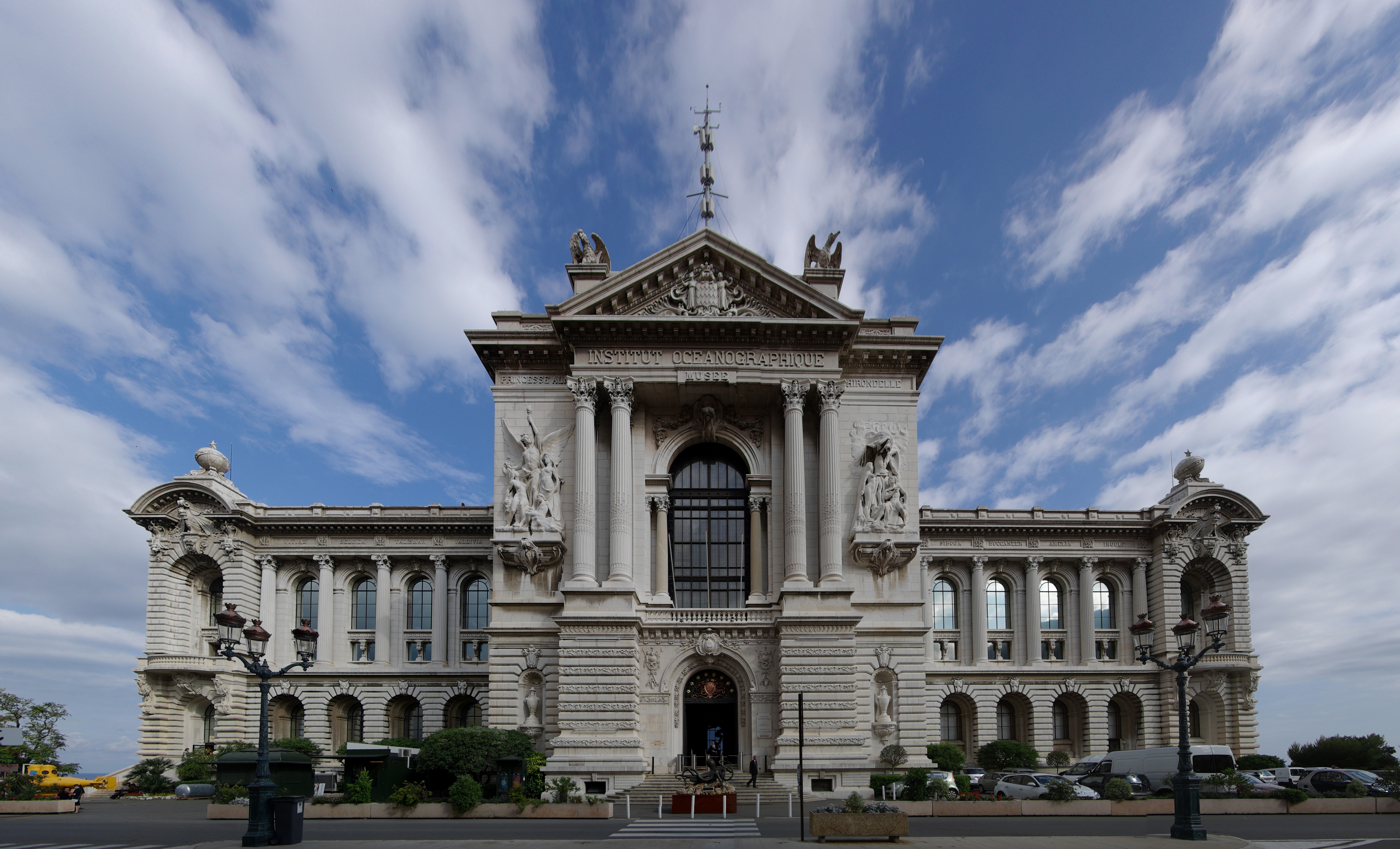
Oceanographic Museum

- Monaco Top Cars Collection
- Napoleon Museum (Monaco)
- Oceanographic Museum
- Museum of Stamps and Coins
- Monaco Naval Museum (Musée Naval)

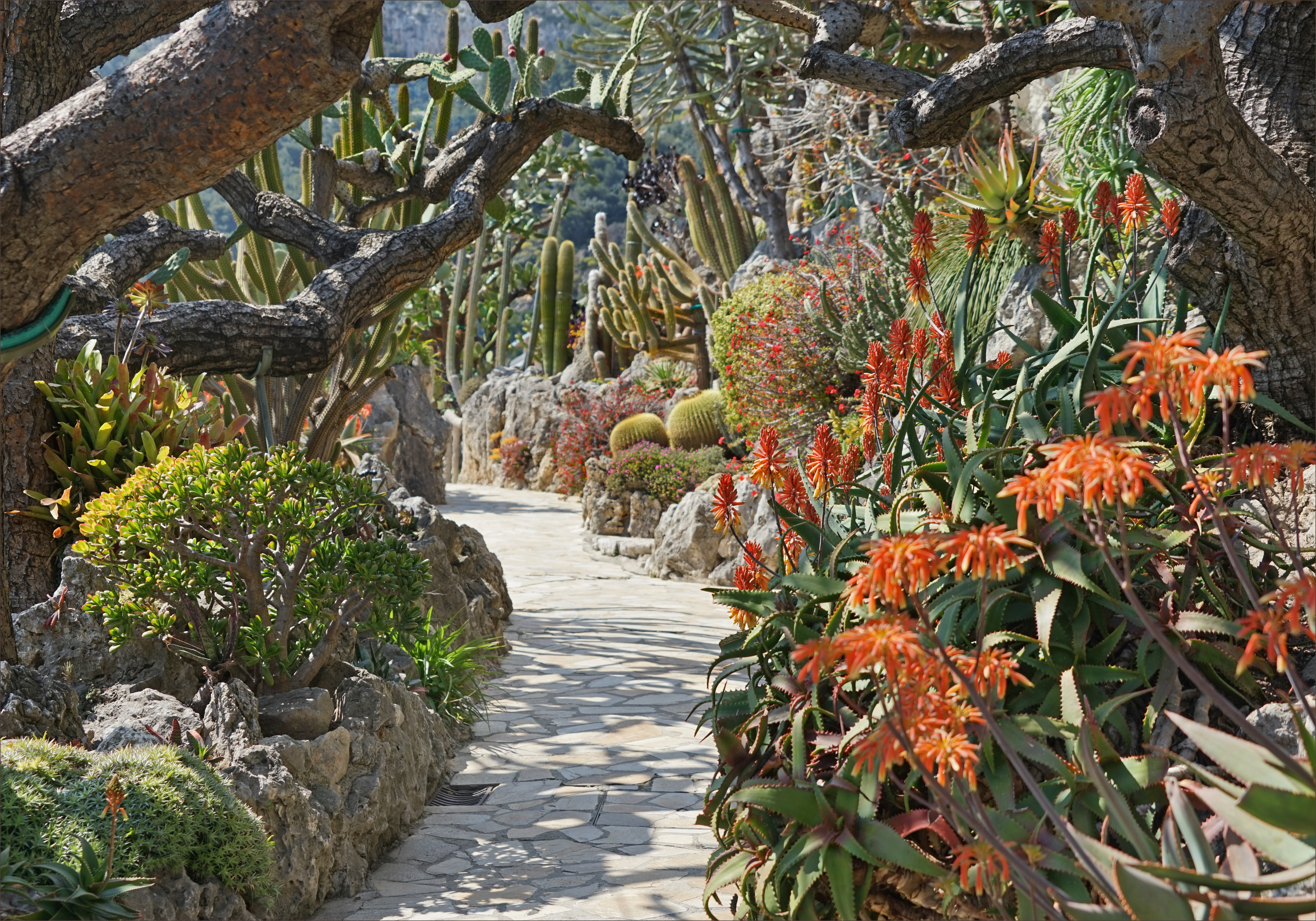
Walkway in the jardin exotique de Monaco (Exotic Gardens)

=== Events, festivals, and shows ===
The Principality of Monaco hosts major international events such as :

- International Circus Festival of Monte-Carlo
- Mondial du Théâtre
- Monte-Carlo Television Festival
- Golden Nymph Awards

==== Bread festival ====
Monaco also has an annual bread festival on 17 September every year.

=== Parks and gardens ===
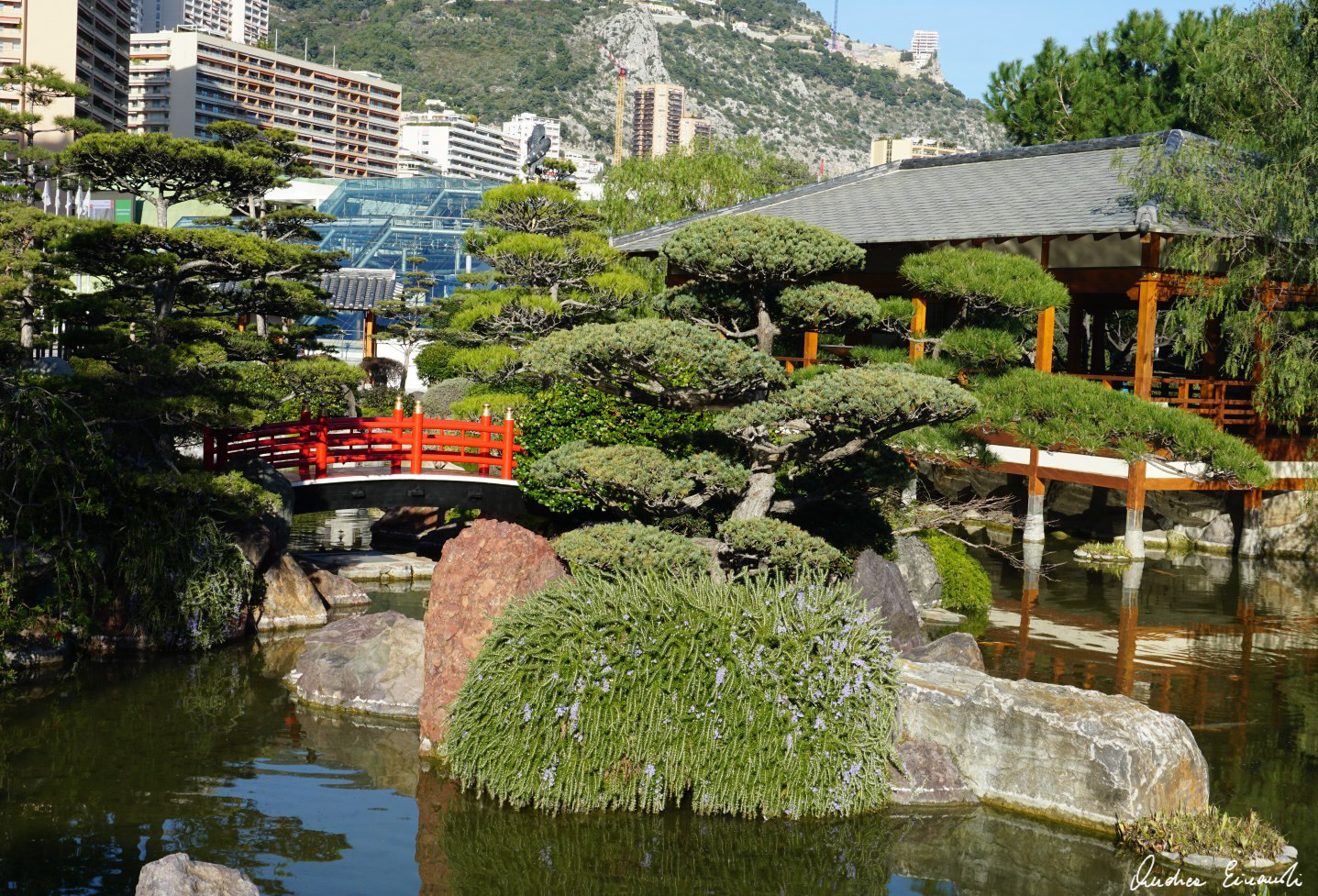
Monaco's Japanese Gardens

There are several gardens in Monaco, which are in a variety of styles and purpose. There is an exotic plant garden, Saint Martin Gardens, African plants garden, Casino Gardens, Princess Grace Rose Garden, and a Japanese Gardens.

=== Music ===
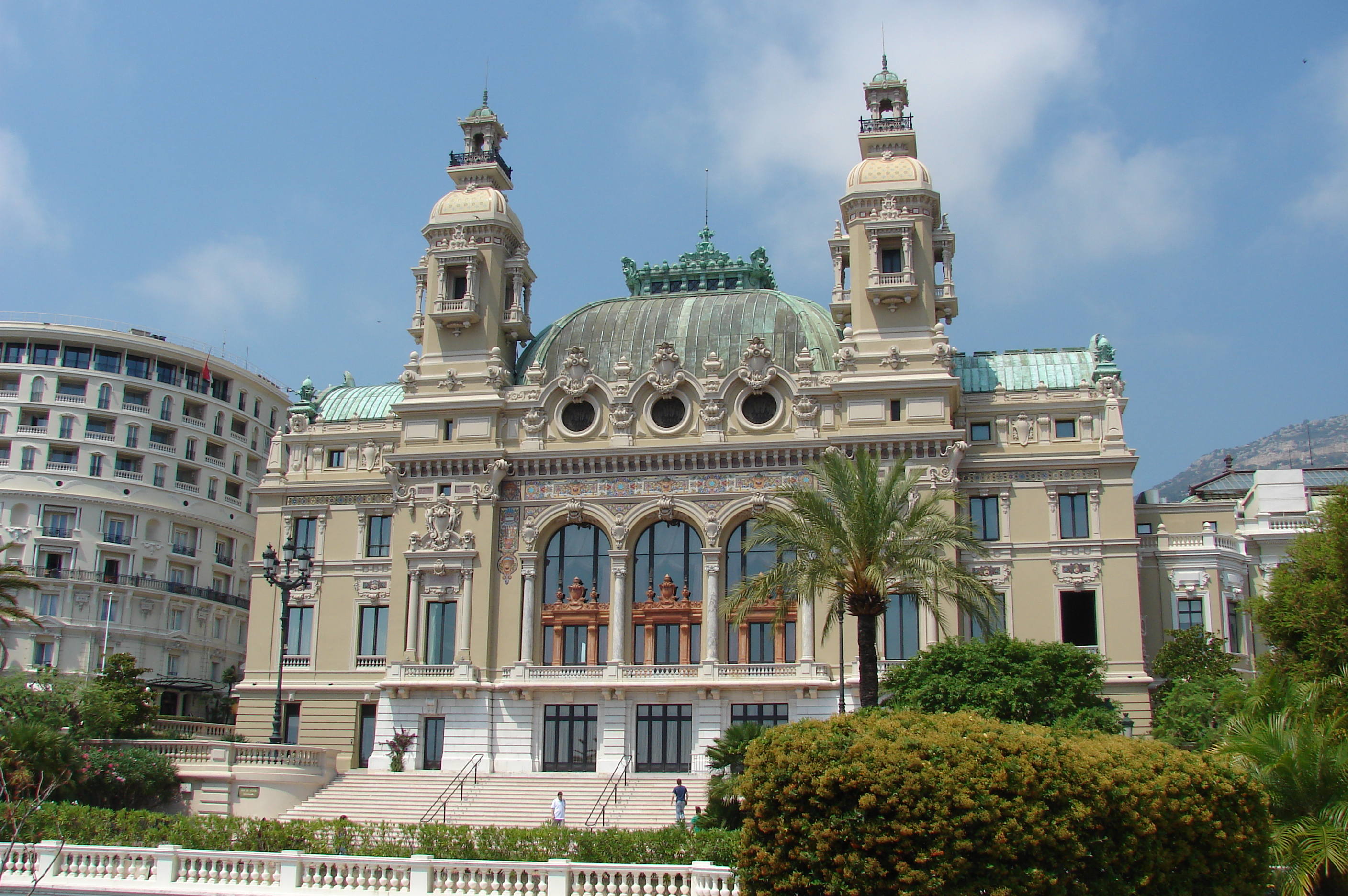
Seaside façade of the Salle Garnier, home of the Opéra de Monte-Carlo

Monaco has an opera house, a symphony orchestra and a classical ballet company. Monaco participated regularly in the Eurovision Song Contest between 1959–1979 and 2004–2006, winning in 1971, although none of the artists participating for the principality was originally Monegasque. French-born Minouche Barelli, however, acquired Monegasque citizenship in 2002, 35 years after her representing the principality in 1967.

=== Cuisine ===
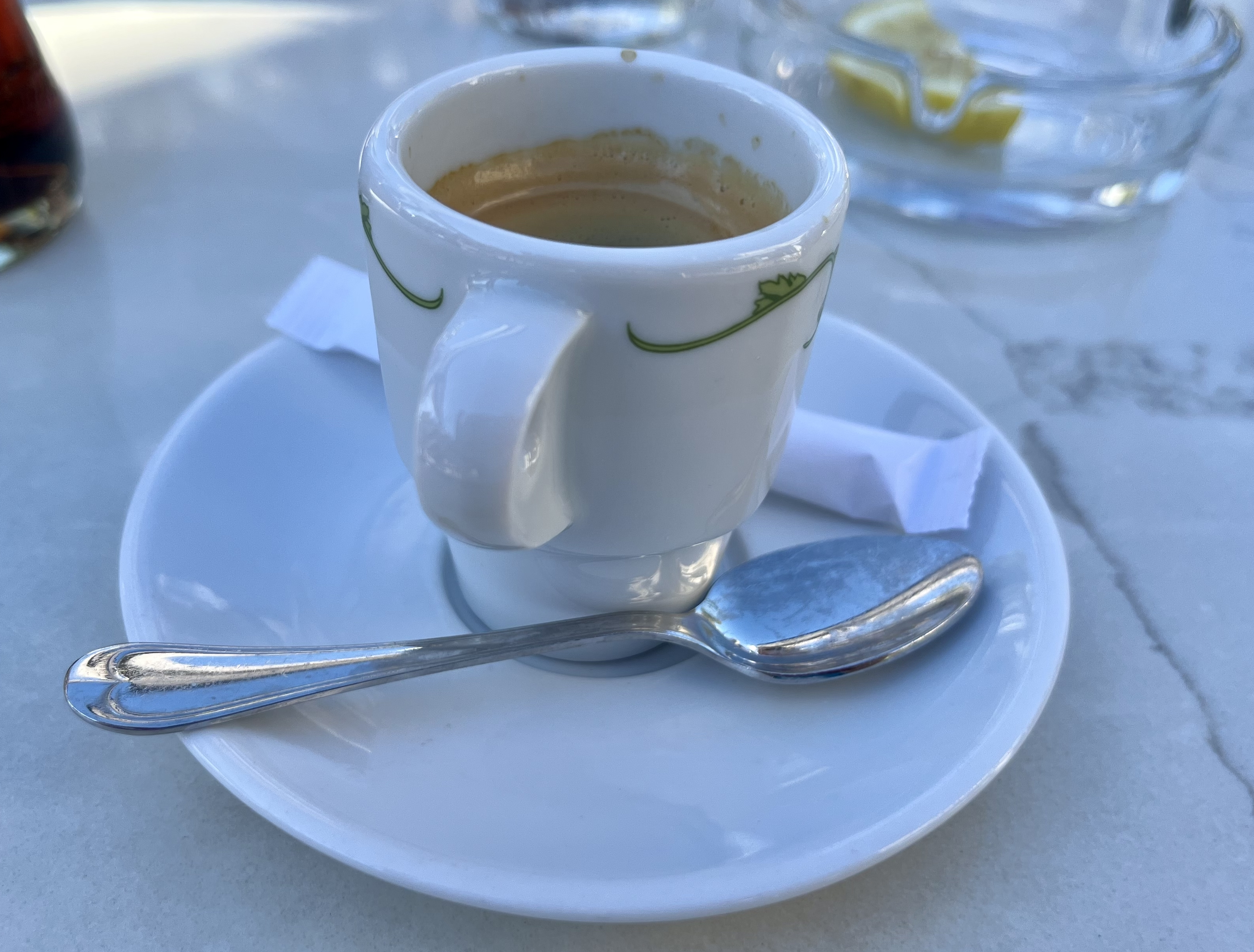
Espresso at Café de Paris, Monte Carlo

The cuisine of Monaco is a Mediterranean cuisine shaped by the cooking style of Provence, France and the influences of nearby northern Italian and southern French cooking, in addition to Monaco's own culinary traditions.

Two famous restaurants in Monaco include the Le Louis XV, currently with three Michelin stars, and the Café de Paris. The Café de Paris is next to the Casino and first opened in 1868, though it has been renovated several times over its lifetime.

=== Sports ===
Major sports in Monaco including motor racing and football. Other sports include athletics, rugby, basketball, and professional boxing. The Stade Louis II is the only football and athletics stadium in the country. The international governing body of World Athletics (WA) is headquartered in Monaco.

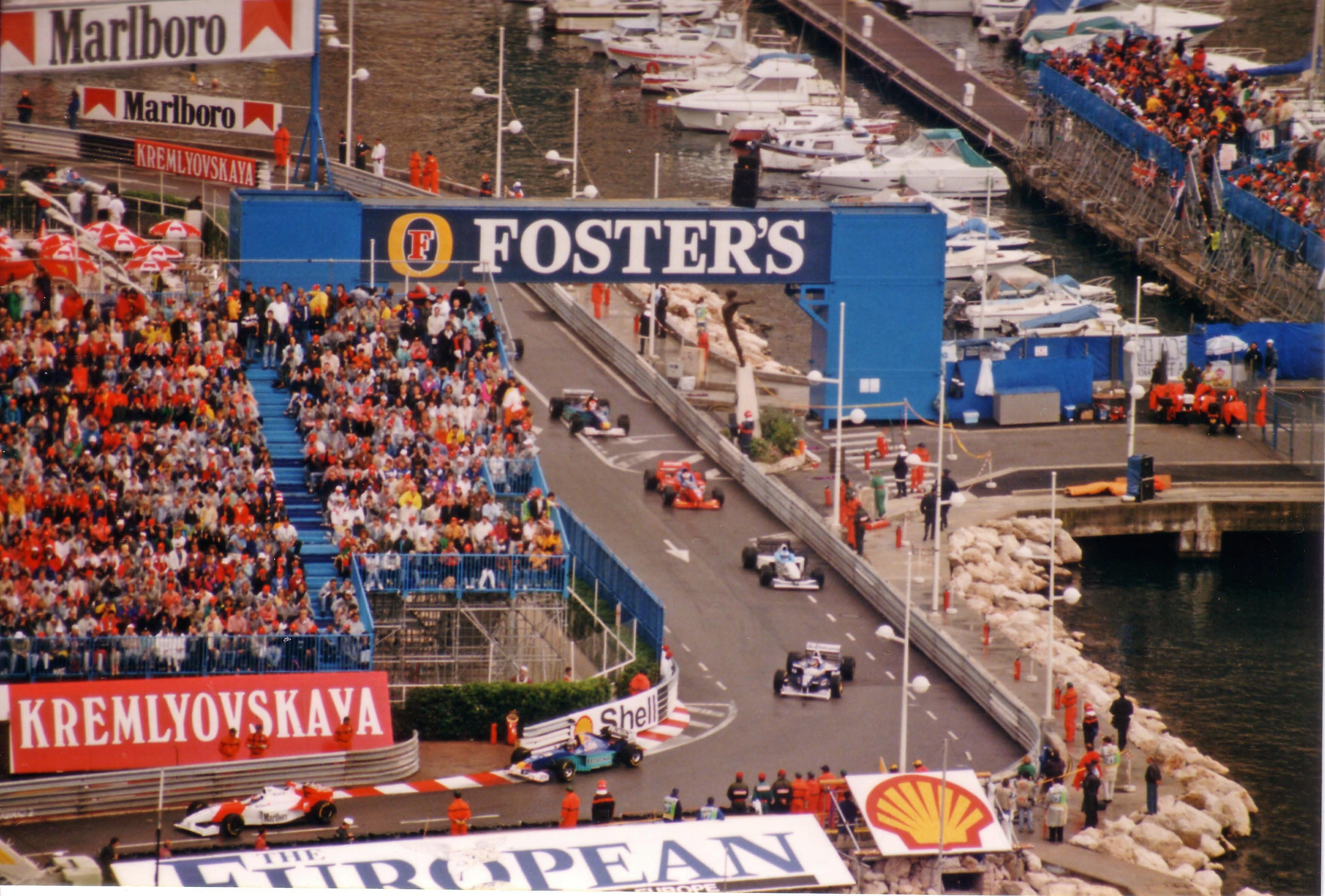
Formation lap of the 1996 Monaco Grand Prix

The highest-profile annual event in the country is the Monaco Grand Prix, which is held on the temporary Circuit de Monaco in Monte Carlo. The race was founded in 1929 and has been on the Formula One calendar since the first season in 1950. Other races also held on the circuit, include Formula 2, Formula 3, the Monaco ePrix, Formula Regional Europe, Porsche Supercup, the Historic Grand Prix of Monaco, and in the past, Formula Renault. Since 1911, the ending portions of the Monte Carlo Rally has been held in the principality. The rally has been on the World Rally Championship calendar for most years and was on the International Rally Championship calendar. In 2014, Monaco inaugurated the Solar1 Monte Carlo Cup, a series of ocean races exclusively for solar-powered boats.

Monaco has two major football teams, both of which play in the French football league system: AS Monaco FC and OS Monaco Women. AS Monaco plays competes in Ligue 1 and is historically one of the most successful clubs in the league. The Monaco national football team represents the nation in minor association football events and is controlled by the Monégasque Football Federation, which manages the amateur Challenge Prince Rainier III tournament. Monaco is not a member of UEFA and does not take part in any UEFA or FIFA competitions.

Due its position as a tourist and gambling centre, Monaco has staged major professional boxing world title and non-title fights from time to time. Those include the Carlos Monzon versus Nino Benvenuti rematch, Monzon's rematch with Emile Griffith, Monzon's two classic fights with Rodrigo Valdez, Davey Moore versus Wilfredo Benitez, the double knockout-ending classic between Lee Roy Murphy and Chisanda Mutti, and Julio César Chávez Sr. versus Rocky Lockridge.

Stade Louis II hosts the annual Diamond League event Herculis in track and field. Monaco also forms part of the Monaco Marathon, the only marathon in the world to pass through three countries as well as an Ironman 70.3 triathlon race. Monaco has been part of Tour de France stages and the 1966 Giro d'Italia.

Monaco competes in the Olympics, Youth Olympic Games, Mediterranean Games, European Games, and the Games of the Small States of Europe. They have yet to win a sporting medal at the Olympic Games, but have had some success in smaller events, including a bronze in bobsleigh at the 2012 Winter Youth Olympics and 5 medals in the Mediterranean Games. The Rainier III Nautical Stadium in the Port Hercules district consists of a heated saltwater Olympic-size swimming pool, diving boards and a slide. The pool is converted into an ice rink from December to March.

=== Flag ===
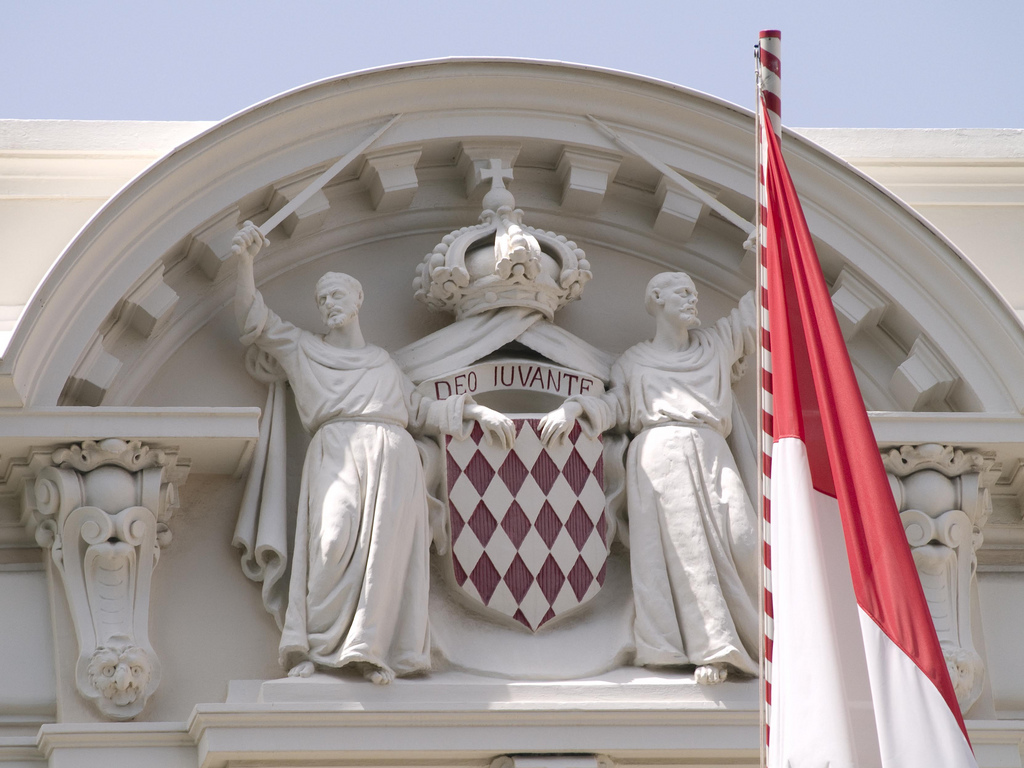
Monaco's flag and its coat of arms

The flag of Monaco is one of the world's oldest national flag designs. Adopted by Monaco on 4 April 1881, it is based on the Monaco Royal colors going back to the 14th century. The ISO code for the Flag is MC, which produces: 🇲🇨

The flag has similarities to the flags of the German states of Hesse and Thuringia, as well as Indonesia, Singapore, and Poland in the modern times.

== See also ==
- ISO 3166-2:MC – Entry for Monaco in ISO 3166-2
- Japanese Garden, Monaco – Park in Monaco
- List of diplomatic missions in Monaco
- List of diplomatic missions of Monaco
- List of rulers of Monaco
- List of sovereign states and dependent territories by population density
- Microstates and the European Union
- Outline of Monaco
