= Transport in Monaco =

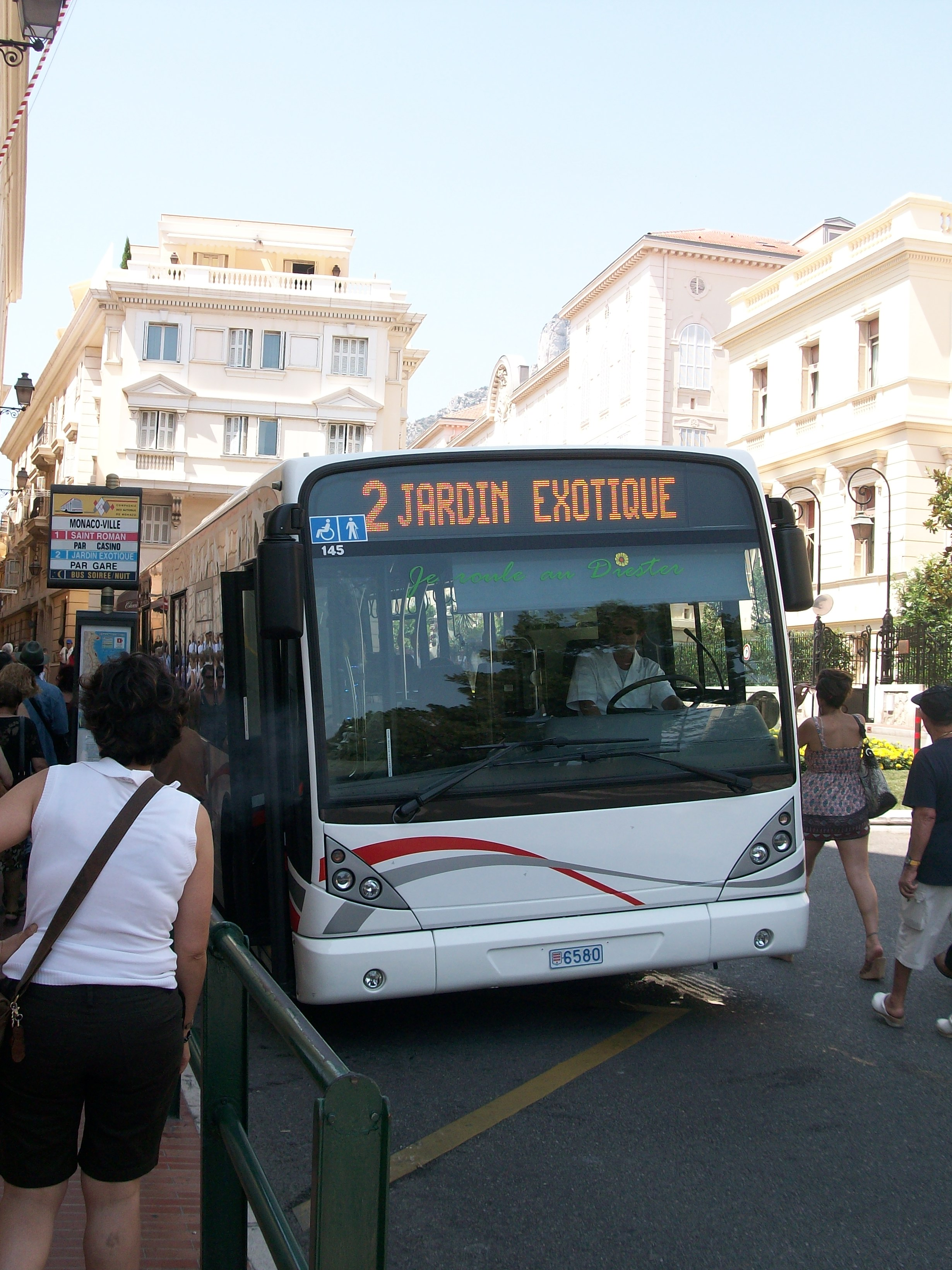
Line 2 at a bus stop

Transport in Monaco is facilitated with road, air (helicopter), rail, and water networks. Rail transport is operated by SNCF with only Monaco Monte Carlo station seeing passenger service and the total length of the line inside the Principality is 1.7 km (1.1 mi). Monaco has several bus routes operated by Compagnie des Autobus de Monaco. There are also two other bus routes which connect Monaco with neighboring regions such as Nice and Menton.

== Rail transport ==
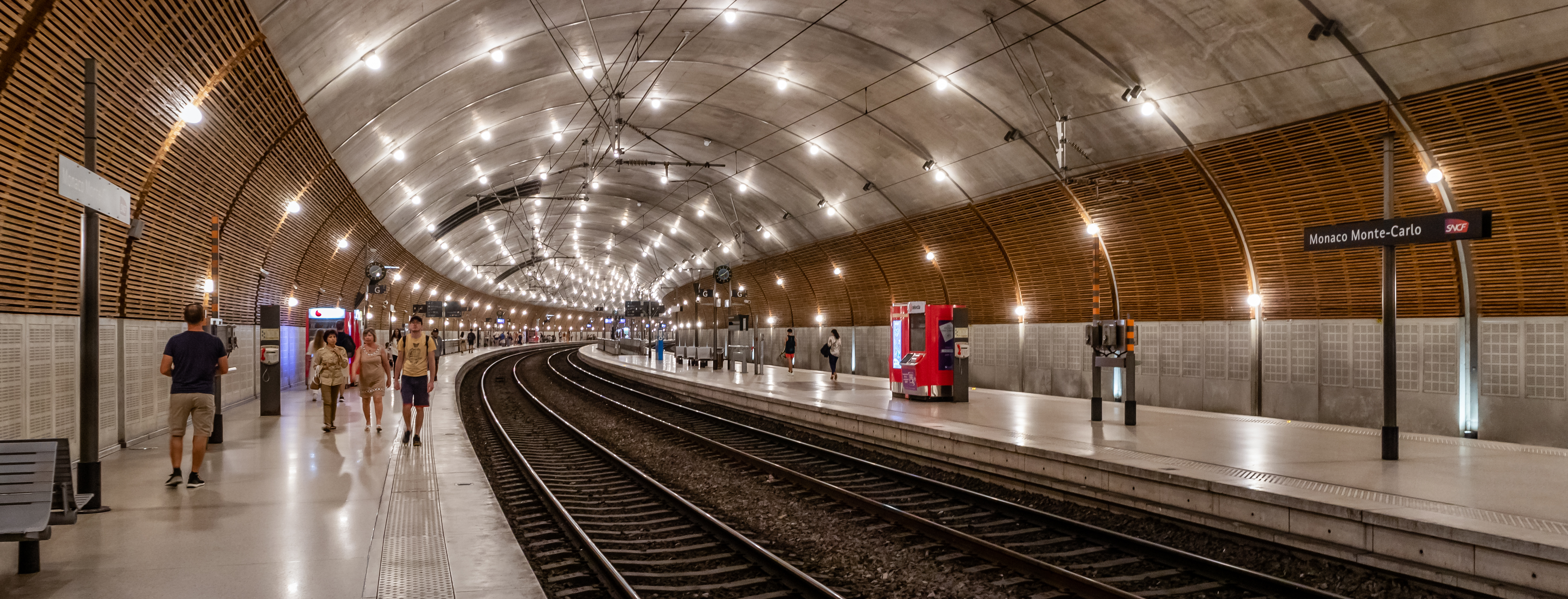
Monaco Monte Carlo station

The railway is totally underground within Monegasque territory, and no trains can be seen at ground level within the nation. It links Marseille to Ventimiglia (Italy) through the principality, and was opened in 1868. Two stations were originally provided, named 'Monaco' and 'Monte-Carlo', but neither remain in current use. The railway line was re-laid, in a new permanent way in tunnels, constructed in two stages. The first, in 1964, was a 3,500 metre tunnel (mostly in French territory) which rendered the original Monte-Carlo station redundant. The second stage, opened in 1999, was a 3 km-long tunnel linked to the first one, allowing the new "underground railway station of Monaco-Monte Carlo" to open. The space where the above ground railway was is now available for development, schools, hotels and commercial facilities, can locate here totaling some four hectares. This station is also served by international trains (including the French TGV) and regional trains ("TER").

== Road transport ==
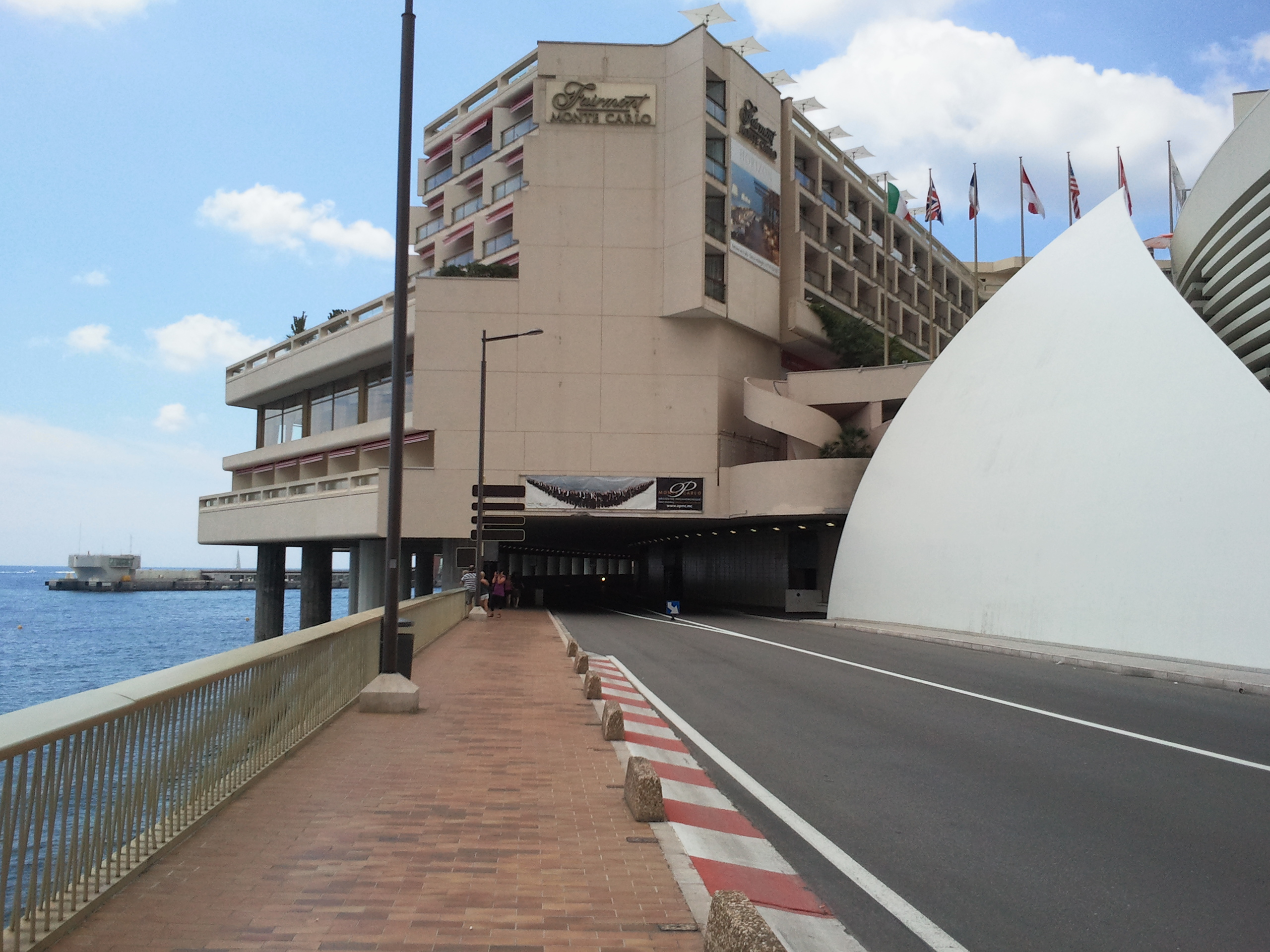
Tunnel underneath the Fairmont hotel in Monaco

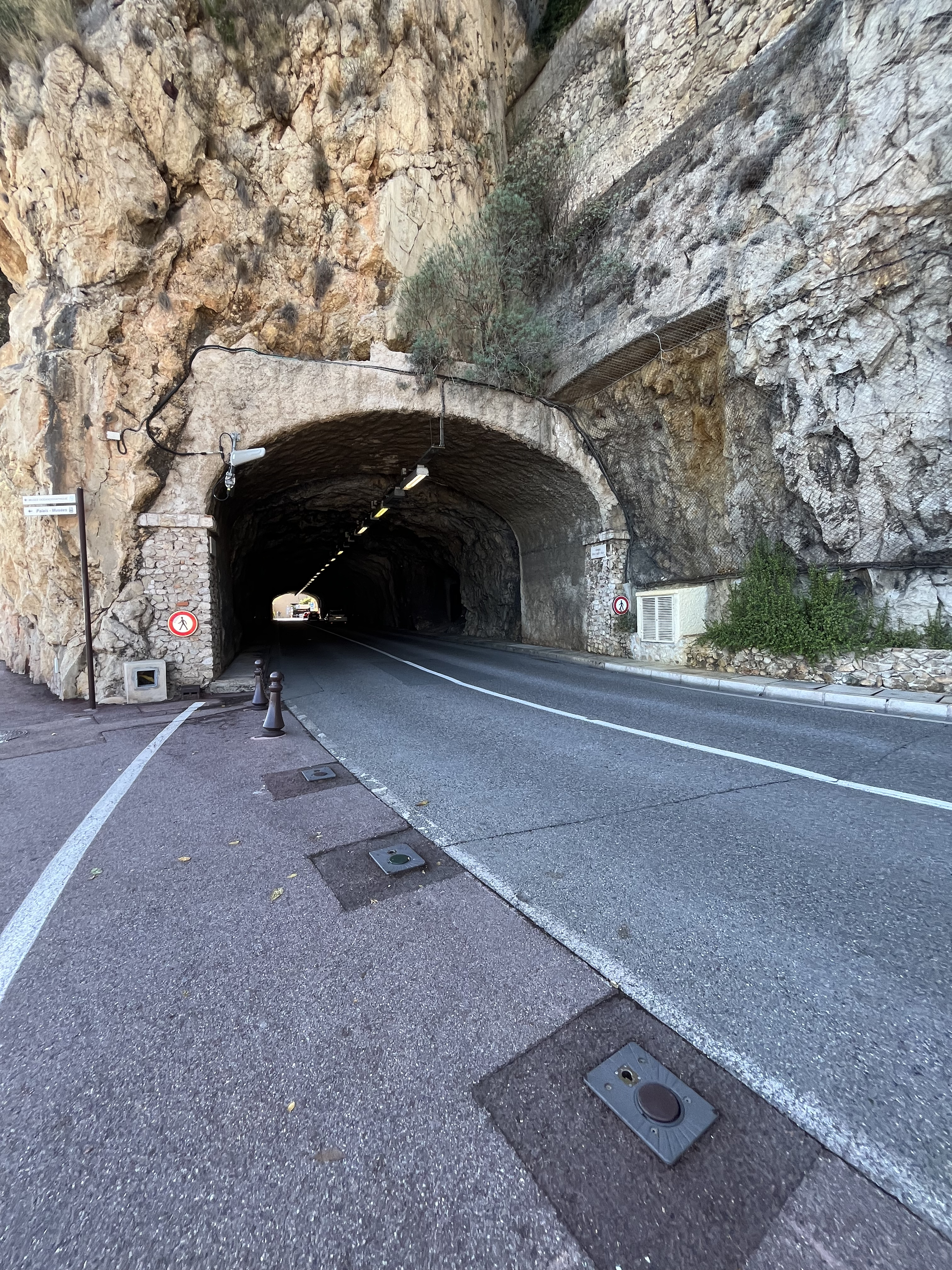
Tunnel des Pêcheurs

Monaco has 50 km of urban roads which provide access to the A8 autoroute. Monaco buries its highways so that traffic flow can be improved and so more land is available.

There is about 77 km (48 miles) of roads in Monaco, many sections of which are also used for automotive and other races. (see also Circuit de Monaco)

== Urban transport ==
=== Elevators / travelators ===
There are seven main inclined lifts (including Elevators and/or travelators) which provide public transport:

- between the Place des Moulins and the beaches
- between the Princess Grace Hospital Centre and the Exotic Garden
- between the Port Hercules harbor and the Avenue de la Costa
- between the Place Str Dévôte and the area of Moneghetti
- between the terraces of the Casino and the Boulevard Louis II
- between the Avenue des Citronniers and the Avenue Grande-Bretagne
- between the highway and the Boulevard Larvotto

=== Bus ===
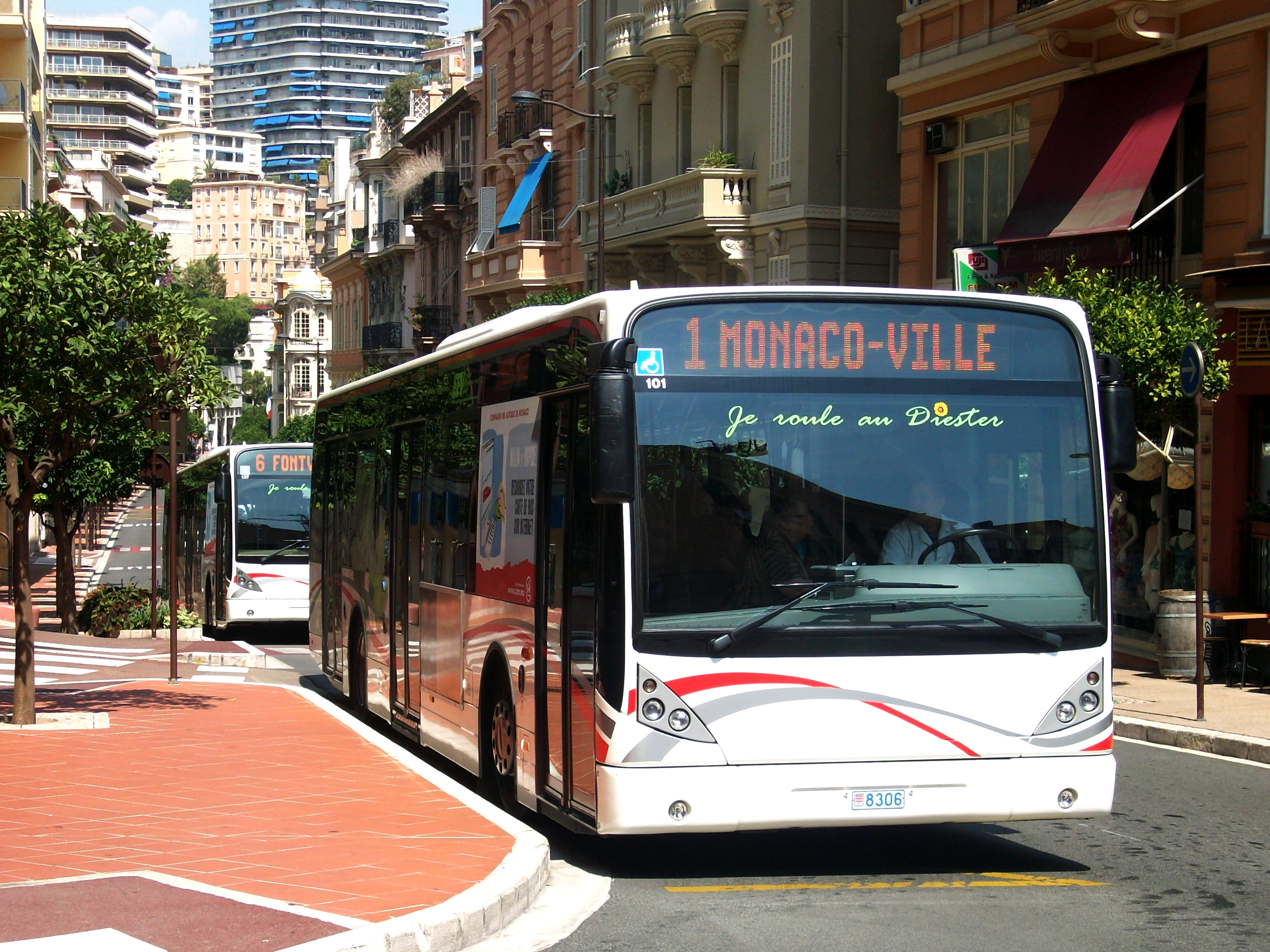
Line 1 with Line 6 behind it

There are six bus routes in Monaco, all operated by Compagnie des Autobus de Monaco (CAM). There are 143 bus stops through the Principality.

- Line 1: Monaco-Ville, Monte-Carlo, Saint Roman and return
- Line 2: Monaco-Ville, Monte-Carlo, Exotic Garden and return
- Line 4: Place d'Armes, Railway station, Monte-Carlo, Saint Roman and return
- Line 5: Railway station, Fontvieille, Hospital and return
- Line 6: Larvotto Beach, Fontvieille and return

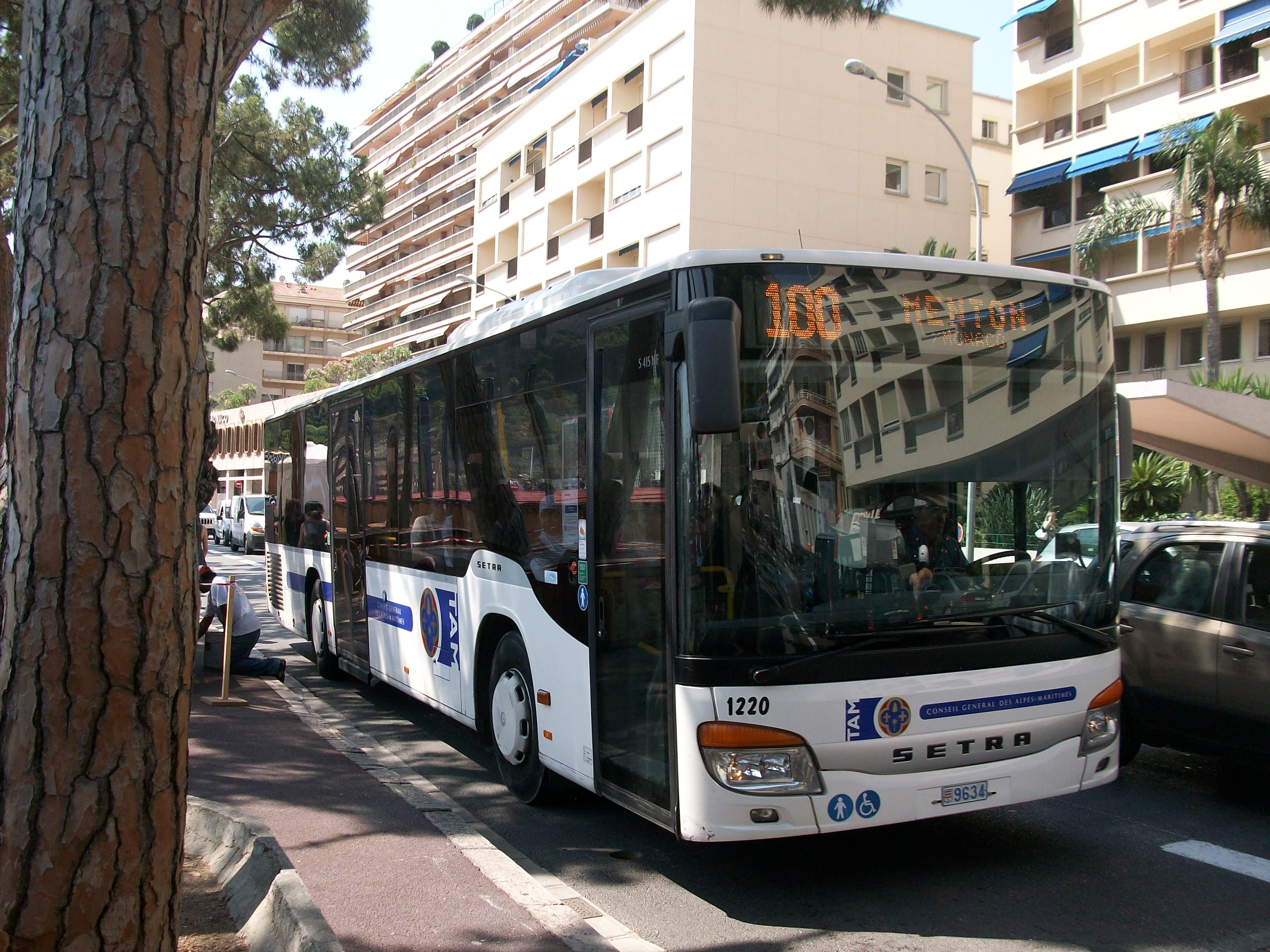
Line 100

There are four other bus routes which connect Monaco with neighbouring regions.

- Line 11: La Turbie, Monaco and return
- Line 100: Nice, Monaco, Menton and return
- Line 100X: Nice, Monaco and return
- Line 110: Nice Airport, Monaco, Menton and return

There is a ferry service "Bateaubus" which operates between both sides of Monaco port. The boat is powered by electricity and operates under the urban bus system tariff.

=== Proposed subway ===
Between October 2024 and February 2025, Monaco launched a call for tenders to construct and exploit a fully automated rapid transit line that would link the city center to the La Brasca parking between Èze and La Turbie. The project, which has an estimated cost of €1.2 billion, aims to reduce the number of cars coming into the country and the ensuing traffic jams. It is planned to be commissioned by 2031.

== Sea transport ==
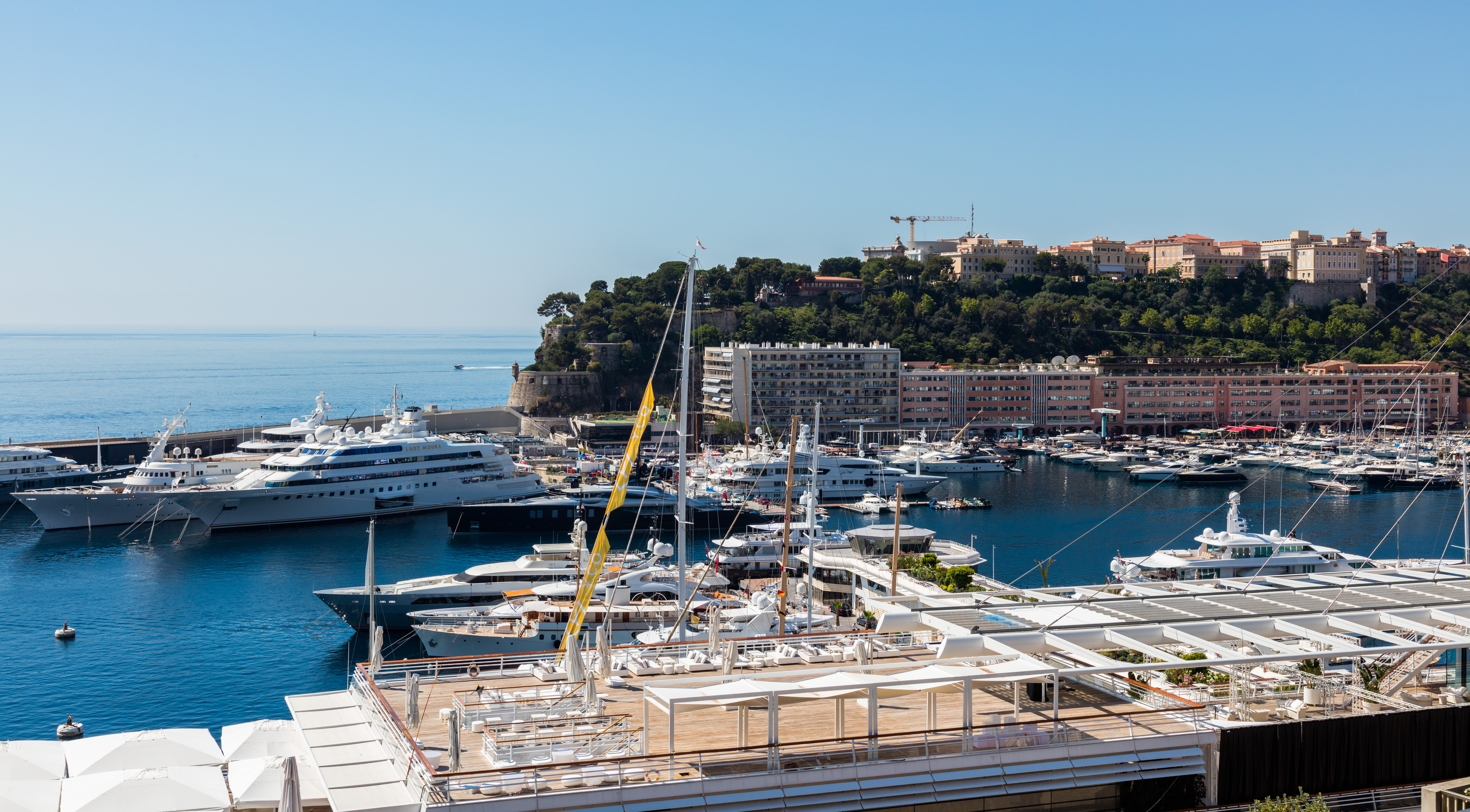
Port Hercules

There are two ports in Monaco, one is Port Hercules and the other is in Fontvieille. There are seasonal ferry lines like the one from Nice to Saint-Tropez.

== Air transport ==
=== Airports ===
There is no airport in the Principality of Monaco. The closest airport is Cote d'Azur Airport in Nice, France, which is connected to Monaco by the Express 110 bus. Alternatively passengers can take Nice tramway line 2 to Nice-Saint-Augustin station and then a train onward to Monaco. Due to the wealth of many visitors and residents, a significant portion of those flying into Nice for travel to Monaco take a helicopter flight to their final destination (see below).

=== Heliports ===
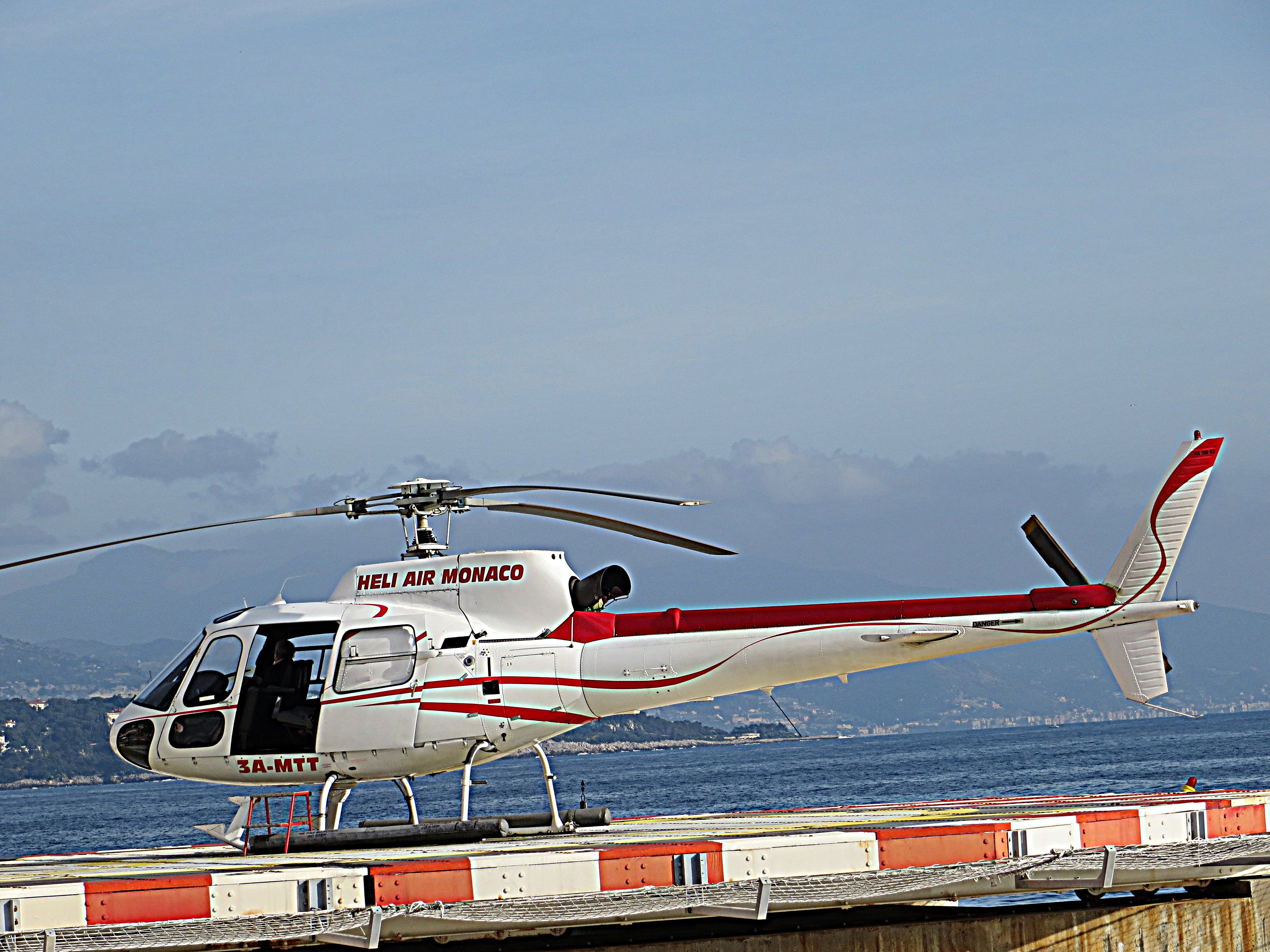
Monaco heliport

A heliport, the Monaco Heliport, is the only aviation facility in the principality. It features shuttle service to and from the international airport at Nice, France. As of May 2005, all Royal Helicopter Service is provided by the James Drabble Aviation Services Committee. This deal sparked a great deal of controversy in the National Council of Monaco, as there was no precedent yet set. Helicopter charter services to French ski resorts are also available.
