= Compagnie des Autobus de Monaco =

Public transport operator in Monaco

Compagnie des Autobus de Monaco (CAM)
- Founded: 1939
- Service area: Monaco
- Service type: Urban area, interurban
- Routes: 6 urban, 4 interurban
- Website: https://www.cam.mc/

Compagnie des Autobus de Monaco (CAM) is the main public transport operator in Monaco. The company operates 6 regular bus lines, a night service, the Boat-Bus service and several school reinforcements.

== History ==
The Compagnie des Tramways de Monaco (CTM), created in 1897, operated several tramway lines during its existence. The trams circulated for the last time on January 26, 1931, before being replaced by buses. In 1939, the CAM succeeded the network of the former CTM.

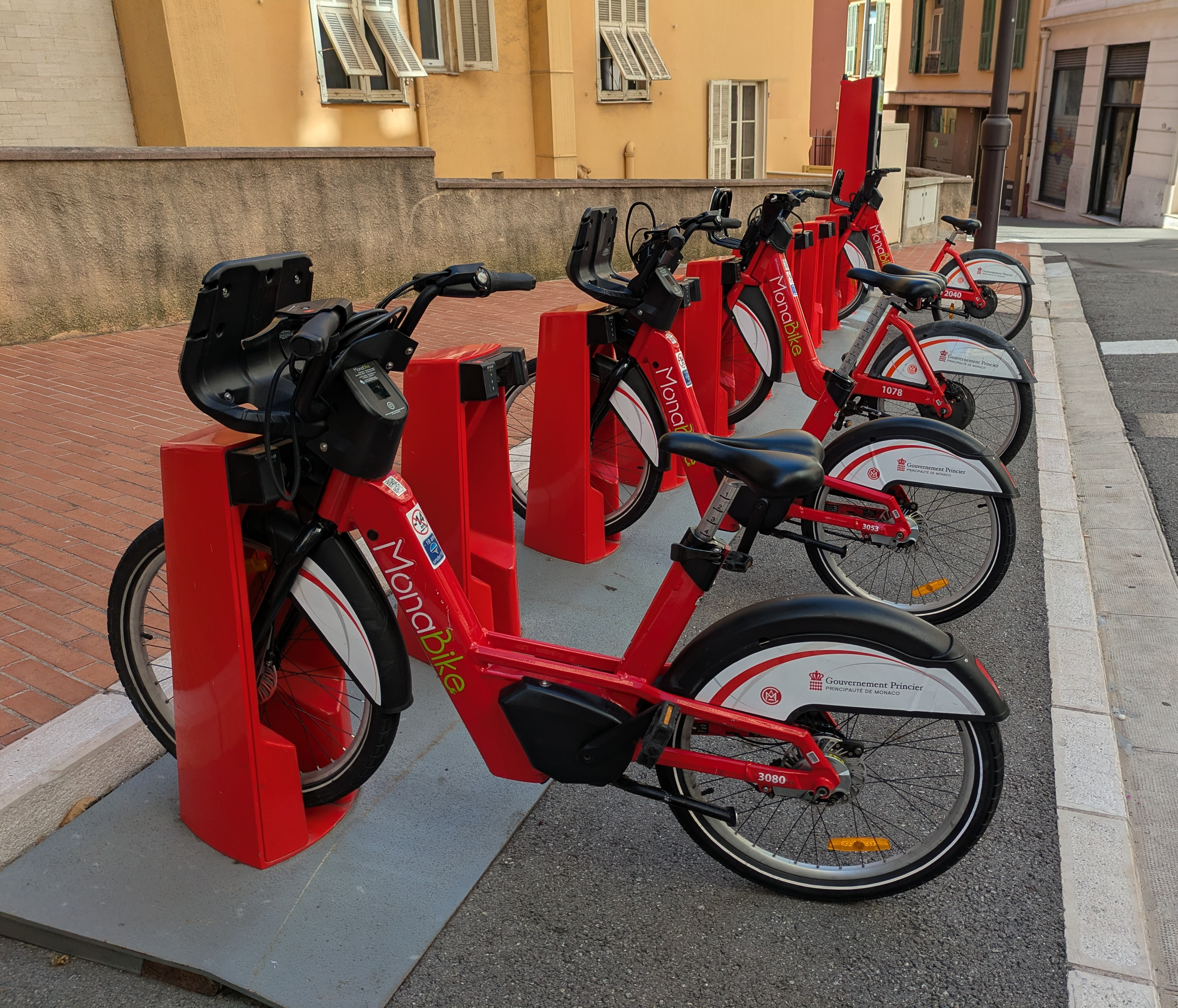
A MonaBike bikeshare station in La Colle, Monaco

In 2019 CAM started collaboration with Canadian company PBSC Solutions Urbaines to provide the Principality with a possibility to get around easily and in an environmentally friendly manner. There are 35 MonaBike stations as of 2020 and if the system works well, other stations will emerge.

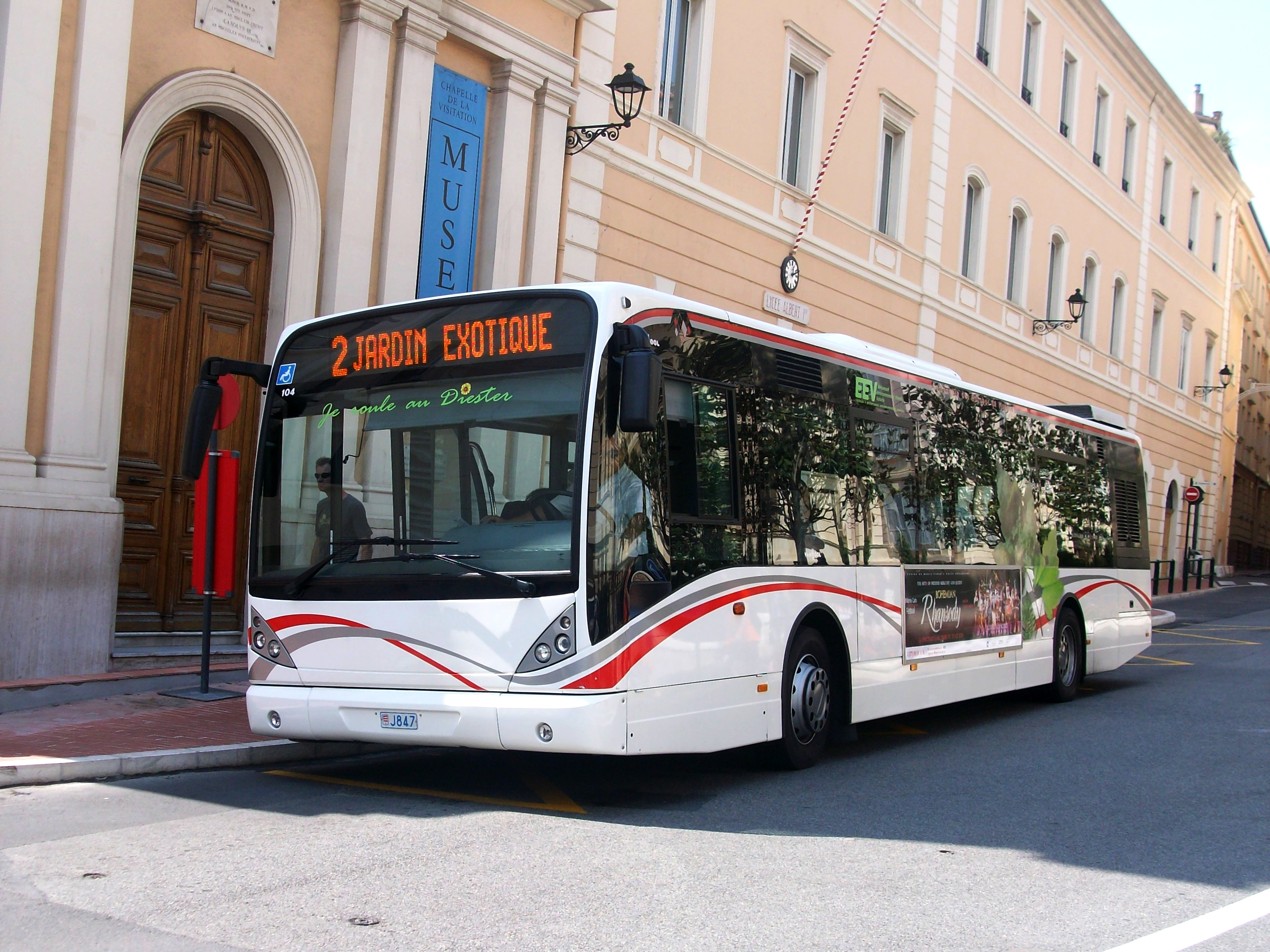
Van Hool A330 - CAM Monaco 104

CAM's goal by 2030, is to have 100% carbon-free, electric or hydrogen buses.

== Routes ==
There are six bus routes in Monaco, all operated by Compagnie des Autobus de Monaco. There are 143 bus stops through the Principality.

- Line 1: Monaco-Ville, Monte-Carlo, Saint Roman and return
- Line 2: Monaco-Ville, Monte-Carlo, Exotic Garden and return
- Line 4: Place d'Armes, Railway station, Monte-Carlo, Saint Roman and return
- Line 5: Railway station, Fontvieille, Hospital and return
- Line 6: Larvotto Beach, Fontvieille and return

There are four other bus routes which connect Monaco with neighbouring regions.

- Line 11: La Turbie, Monaco and return
- Line 100: Nice, Monaco, Menton and return
- Line 100X: Nice, Monaco and return
- Line 110: Nice Airport, Monaco, Menton and return

There are two night routes.

- N1: Albert II - Larvotto Beach and return
- N2: Monaco-Ville - Jardin Exotique and return

There is a ferry service "Bateaubus" which operates between both sides of Monaco port. The boat is powered by electricity and operates under the urban bus system tariff.
