= Architecture of Monaco =

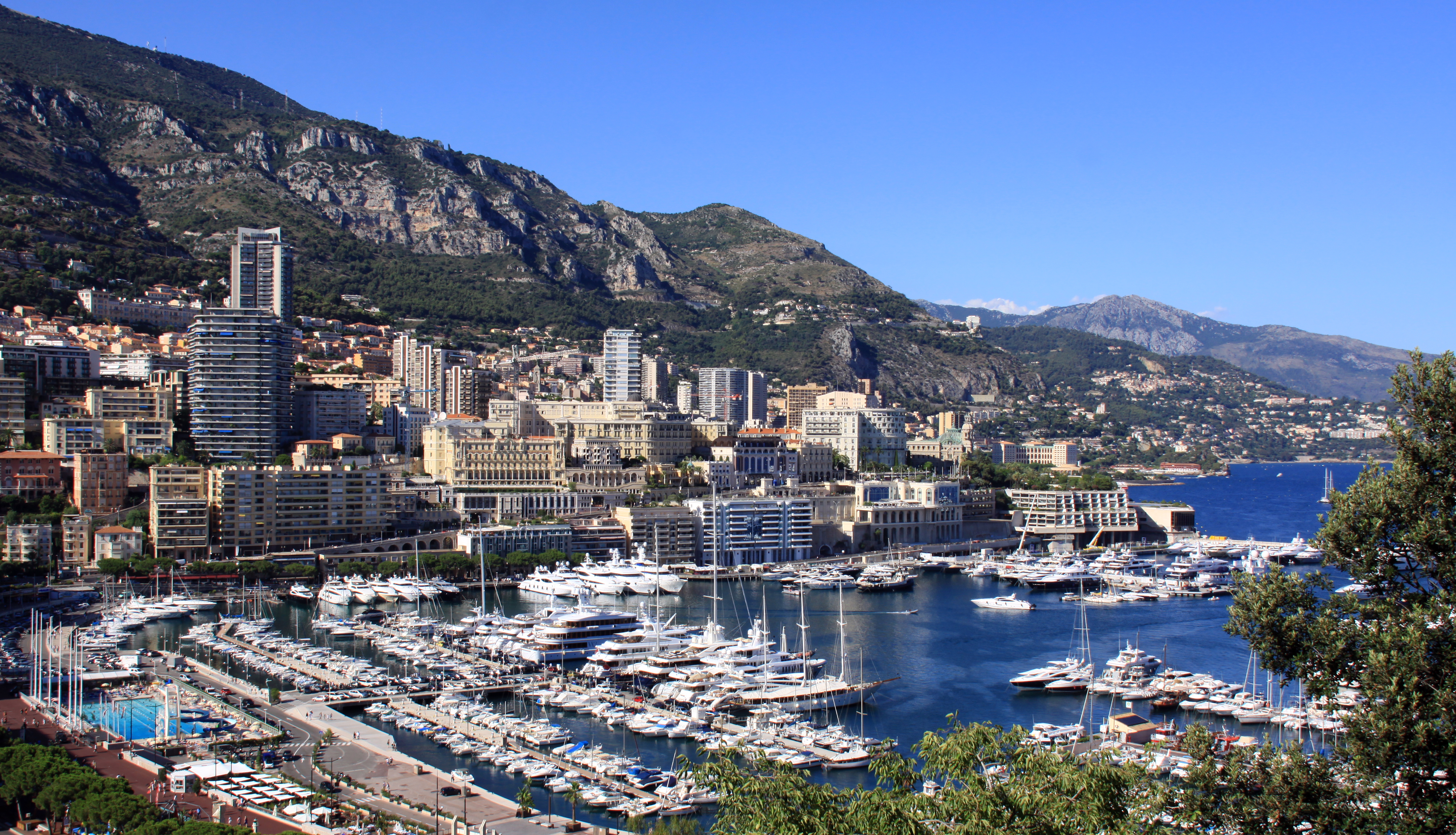
Architectural landscape of Monaco

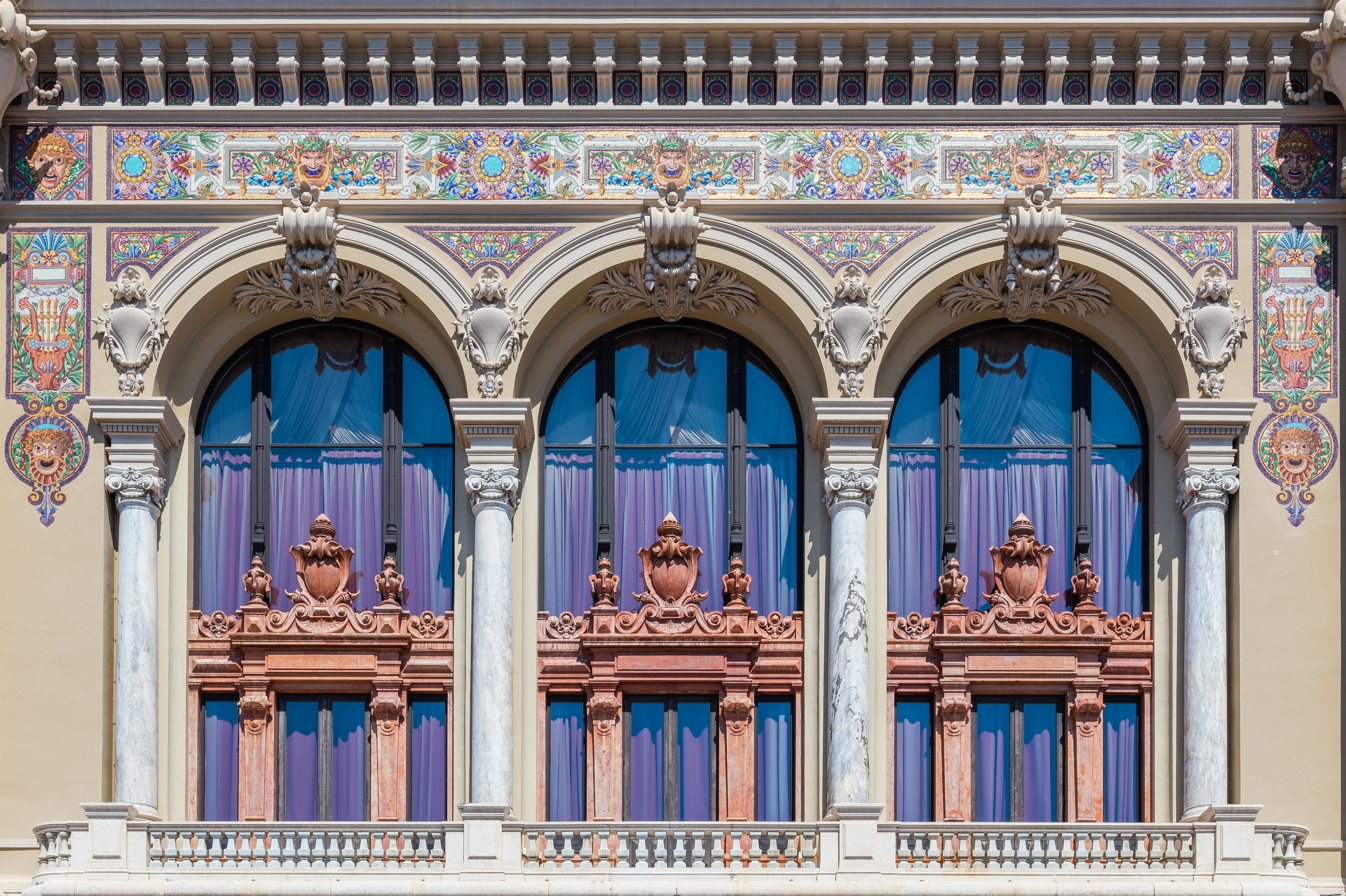
Windows of the Casino de Monte Carlo

The modern highrise Tour Simona in Monaco by architect Jean-Pierre Lott

Monaco is known for its wide range of architecture for a small country. The geography of Monaco, which consists of sharp hills and narrow coastline, influences the Monagasque architecture. The narrow roads have led to architectural construction being built into the hills in limited amounts of space. This limited space has, more recently, the issue of construction in Monaco has created social disruption.

The history of the architecture of Monaco can be predominantly attributed to its location on the South East of France, which has allowed strong French influence, especially that of the Belle Époque period. Italian qualities can also be found due to proximity, Genoese heritage and the influence of the Capriccio movement, incorporated in the housing architecture of notable structures in Monte Carlo. Notable Monagasque works of French architects Charles Garnier and Jules Dutrou epitomise the mixture of other European and historical influences. Decorative features like coloured turrets, terraces and caryatids are distinct throughout Monte Carlo. Modern Monégasque architecture is reflective of Mediterranean influence, with the predominantly used materials sourced locally; including granite, marble and terracotta tiles. The warm climate encourages outdoor living and provides an explanation for the prevalence of public squares and balconies throughout the country.

== History ==
=== Medieval ===
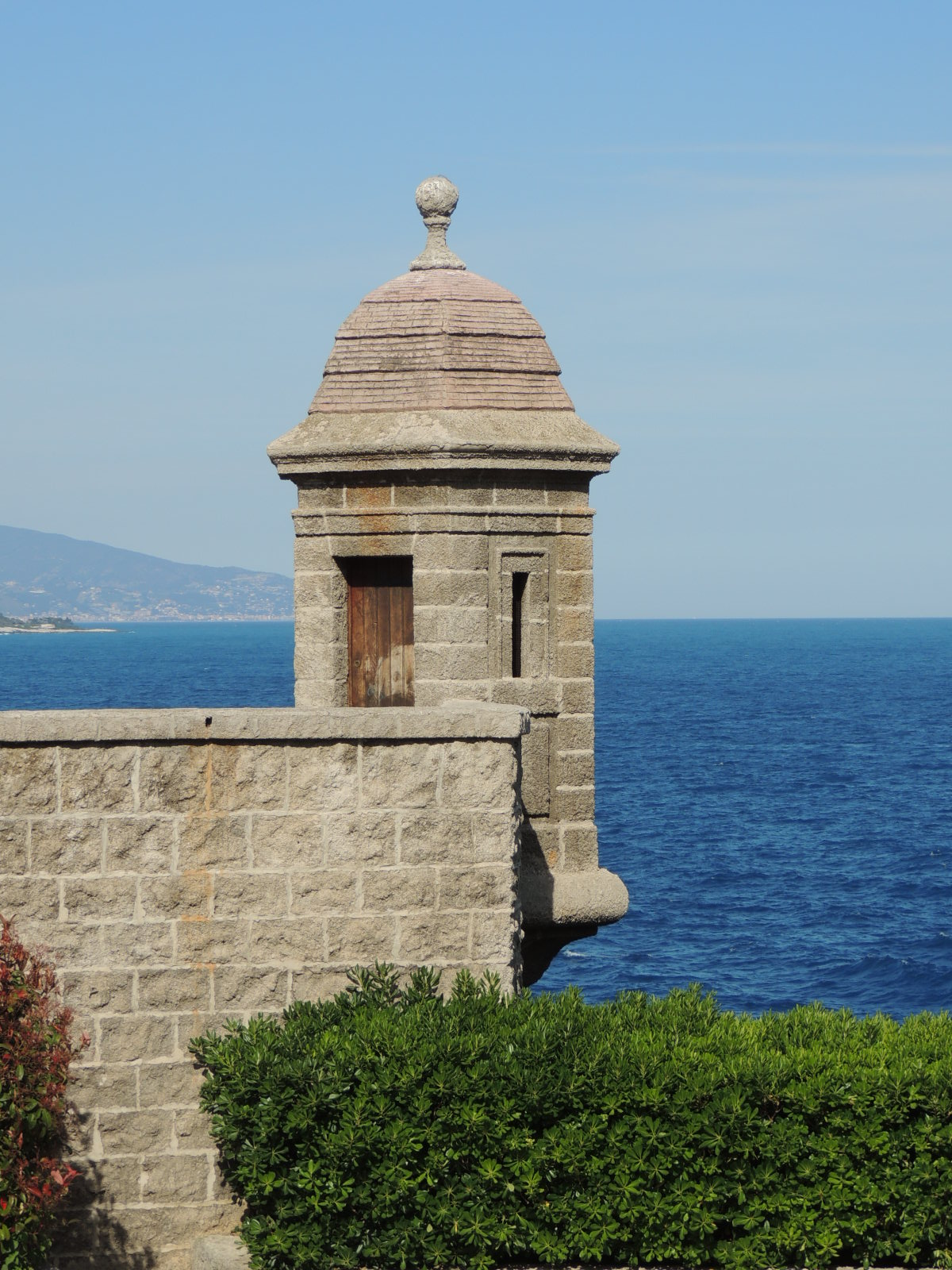
A traditional turret at Fort Antoine Theatre in Monaco

The Medieval period (ranging from the fall of the Roman Empire to the beginning of the Renaissance) greatly influenced the architecture of Monaco. In 1215, the Ghibellines of Genoa colonised Monaco due to its strategic location on the harbour, after receiving rule over the region from Emperor Henry VI. The Genoese built a walled city with a fortress on the Rock of Monaco. Medieval structures, such as the Palais du Prince, have remained from the fortified city of Monaco-Ville on the Rock.

The Medieval period has also implemented key structural features, such as the turrets. Many structures from the 5th to 15th century in the principality can be found to have a turret, which was implemented and used to provide a projecting defensive position during military warfare.

=== Renaissance ===
The Renaissance, or 'rebirth', movement following the Middle Ages from the 14th century to the 16th century, influenced European art and architecture greatly, especially France and Monaco.

The Monte-Carlo Casino includes a room named 'Salle Renaissance', which directly translates to 'Room of Rebirth', and it distinct for its architectural style. It is one of the oldest rooms in the Casino, and is the antechamber to the gaming rooms. Salle Renaissance features a restaurant and a bar, morphing Renaissance architecture with modern-day life in Monte-Carlo.

=== Capriccio ===
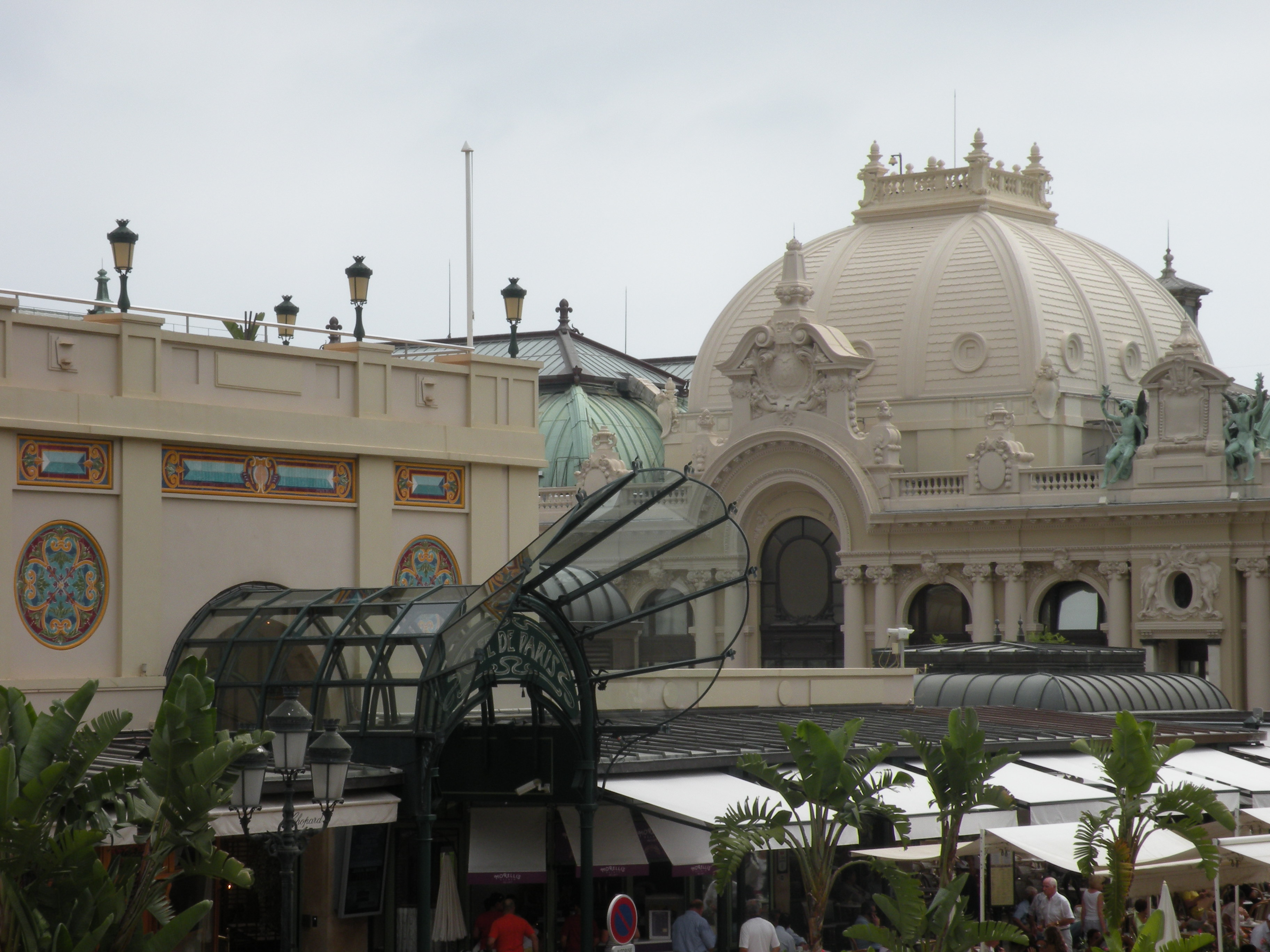
Cafe de Paris, Monte Carlo

Capriccio refers to an architectural fantasy, placing together buildings and other architectural elements in fictional and fantastical combinations. As defined by Italian art historian and biographer Filippo Baldinucci, the style of Capriccio is a "dreamlike interpretation of the subject of a work that comes from a free imagination". It is not a single building or architectural structure in Monaco which reveals the true influence of the Capriccio art movement on the nation, but the pickled, varying combination of the old and new structures in harmony. As seen in the image, it is the Capriccio movement which led to the creation of the Monte Carlo Casino, Pavilions, and multitude of hotels seamlessly interweaving to create the holistic architectural style of Monaco.

=== The Belle Époque ===
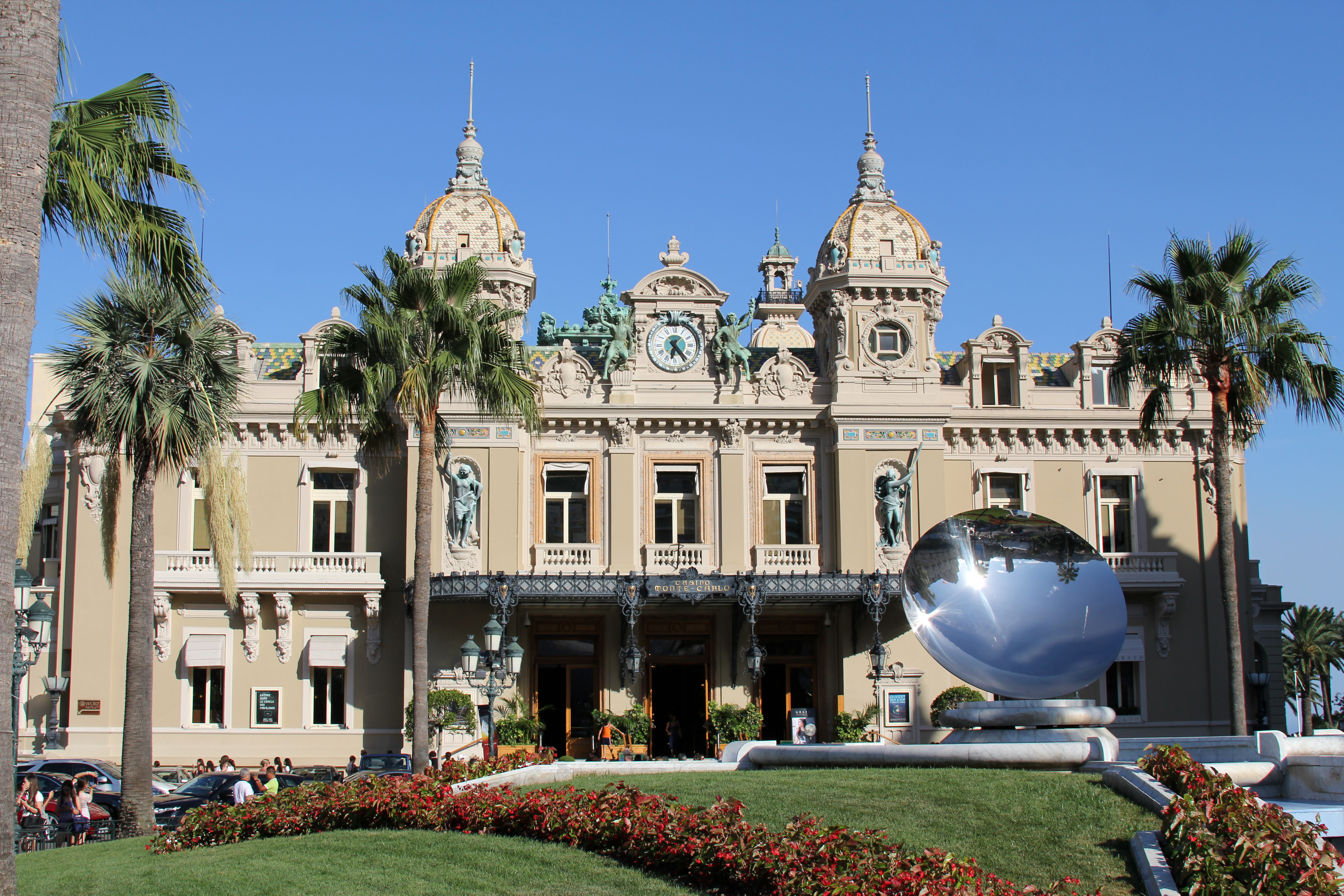
The Monte Carlo Casino

Monte Carlo has many fine Belle Époque buildings, the most famous being the Monte Carlo Casino. Belle Époque translates to Beautiful Age (referring to the time period between 1871 and 1914), and heavily influenced Monaco's architectural development. The period can be categorised by the stylistic characteristics of Art Nouveau, which consisted of natural forms, structures, flowers, plants and curved lines. The Monagasque architecture was focused on harmonising man made structures with the natural environment.

The continued effects of the Industrial Revolution saw industries, the production of raw materials, and consumption grow dramatically across Europe including Monaco. This led to the growth of the economy and ultimately the construction of multiple seminal structures. Today, these sites remain true to the Belle Époque style, in particular the Hôtel Hermitage Monte-Carlo and the Salle Garnier.

== Architectural classification ==
=== Housing ===
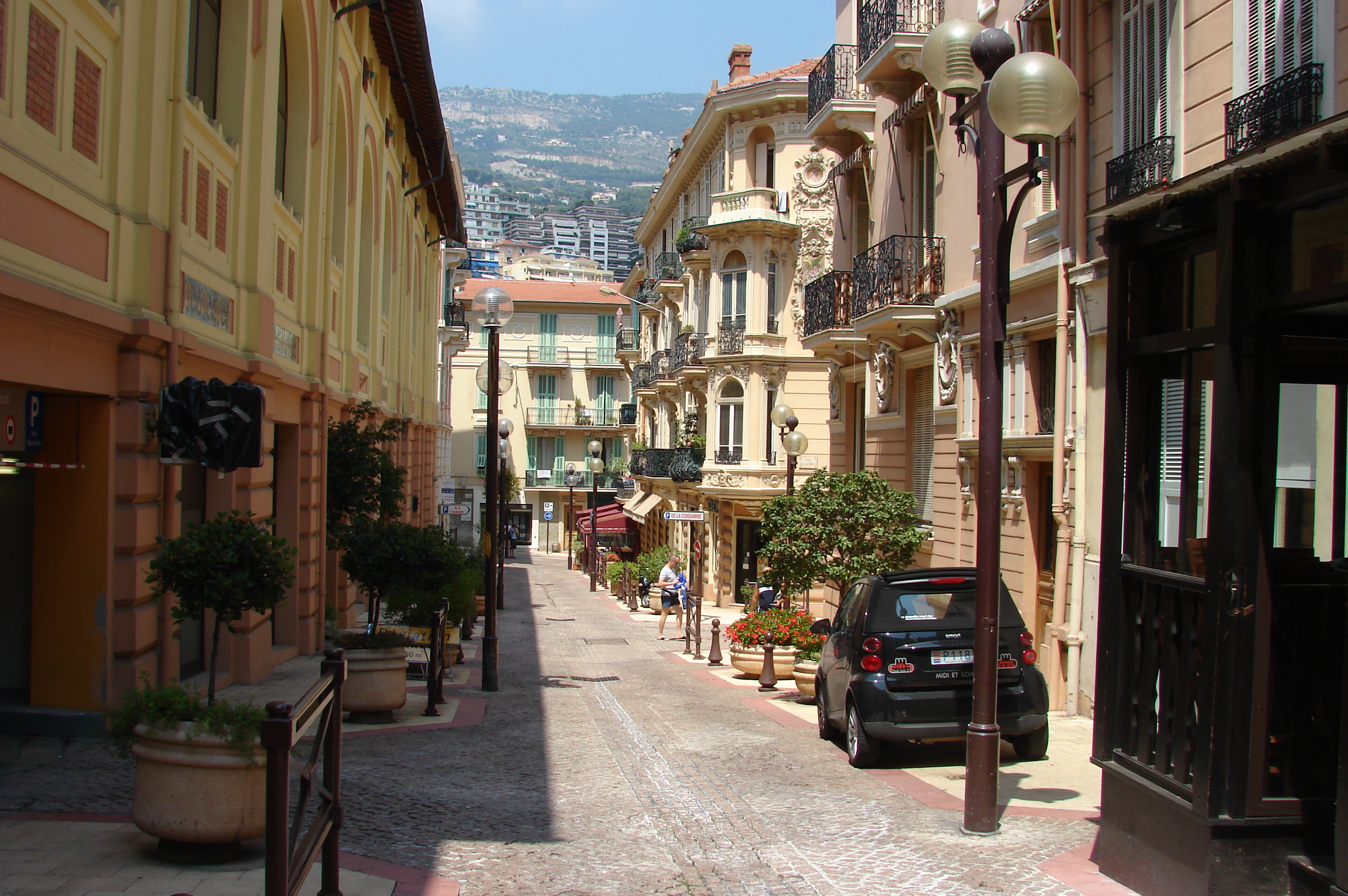
Street in Monaco

The growing population of the principality, due to its taxation laws, climate and landscape, has led to Monaco becoming the most densely populated country in the world, according to the United Nations Department of Economic and Social Affairs Population Division. This mass increase in inhabitants and limited physical area has led to pressure on the architectural design and creation of housing for these immigrants.

== Construction ==
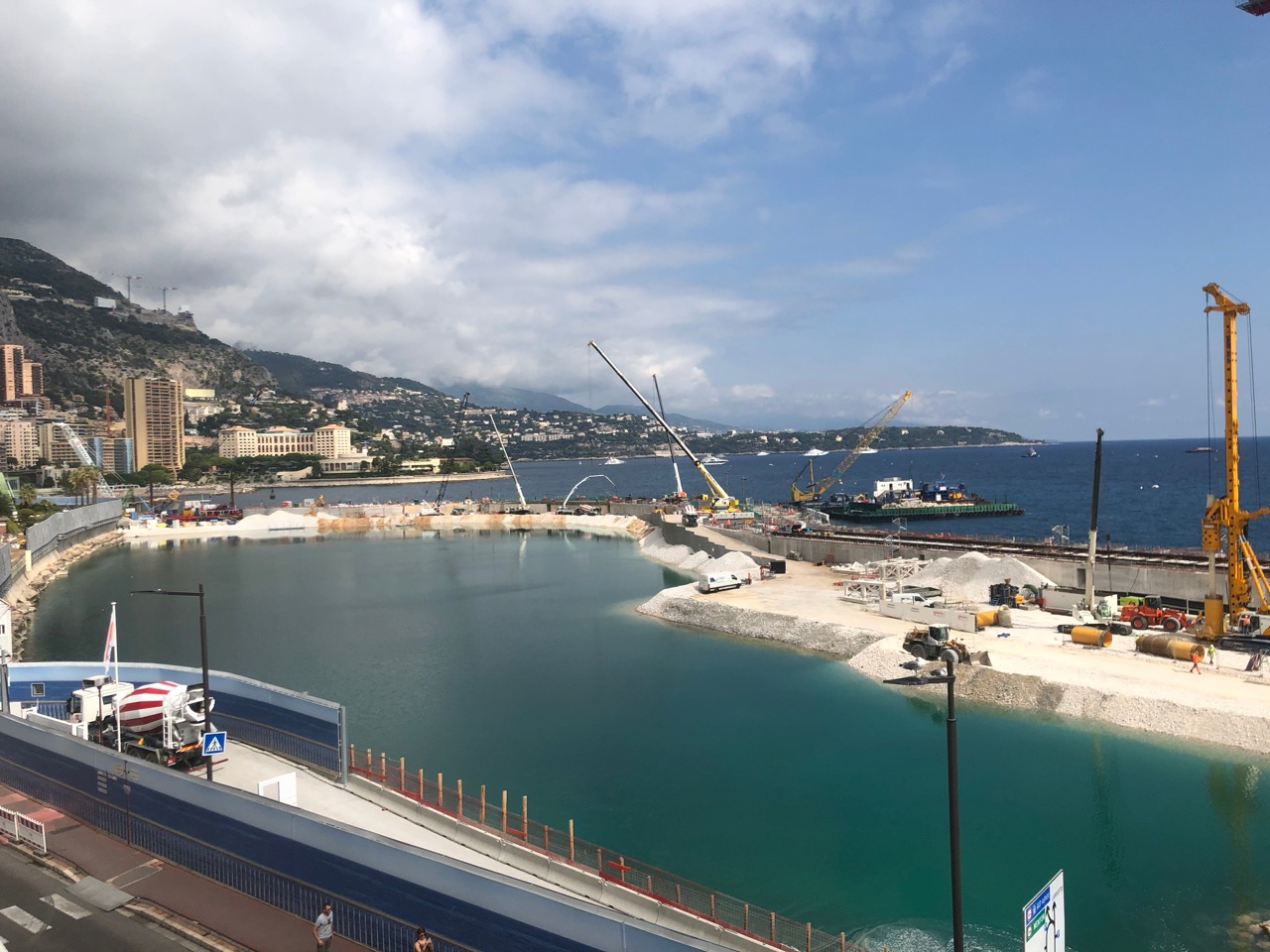
Some land reclamation for Mareterra (Le Portier) expansion

The major development in Monte Carlo in the 1970s led Prince Rainier III to ban high-rise construction. Despite Prince Albert II reversing this Sovereign Order, the accelerating demolition of Monaco's architectural heritage has produced apprehension. Monaco currently has no heritage protection legislation, and therefore, architectural construction continues to be proposed and built in Monaco – despite social outcry. The rising issue of new construction has created unrest amongst Monaco locals. Examples of this can be seen below:

- The Odeon Tower is a luxury 49-floor residential building, being built on the eastern side of Monaco. This construction has caused unrest, including a peaceful protest aimed at urging the principality of Monaco to restrict building.
- The Fontvieille quarter, adjacent to the Fontvieille harbour, Monaco is being designed by Studio Fuksas. The project design details a vertical that links the city to the sea; influencing by the nature throughout the Mediterranean landscape.
- The introduction of an eco-district in Monaco, which is to include a sequence of floating seaside residences to promote sustainability through modern architecture. Renzo Piano Building Workshop is designing the houses above a seaside promenade on caissons.

== Notable structures ==
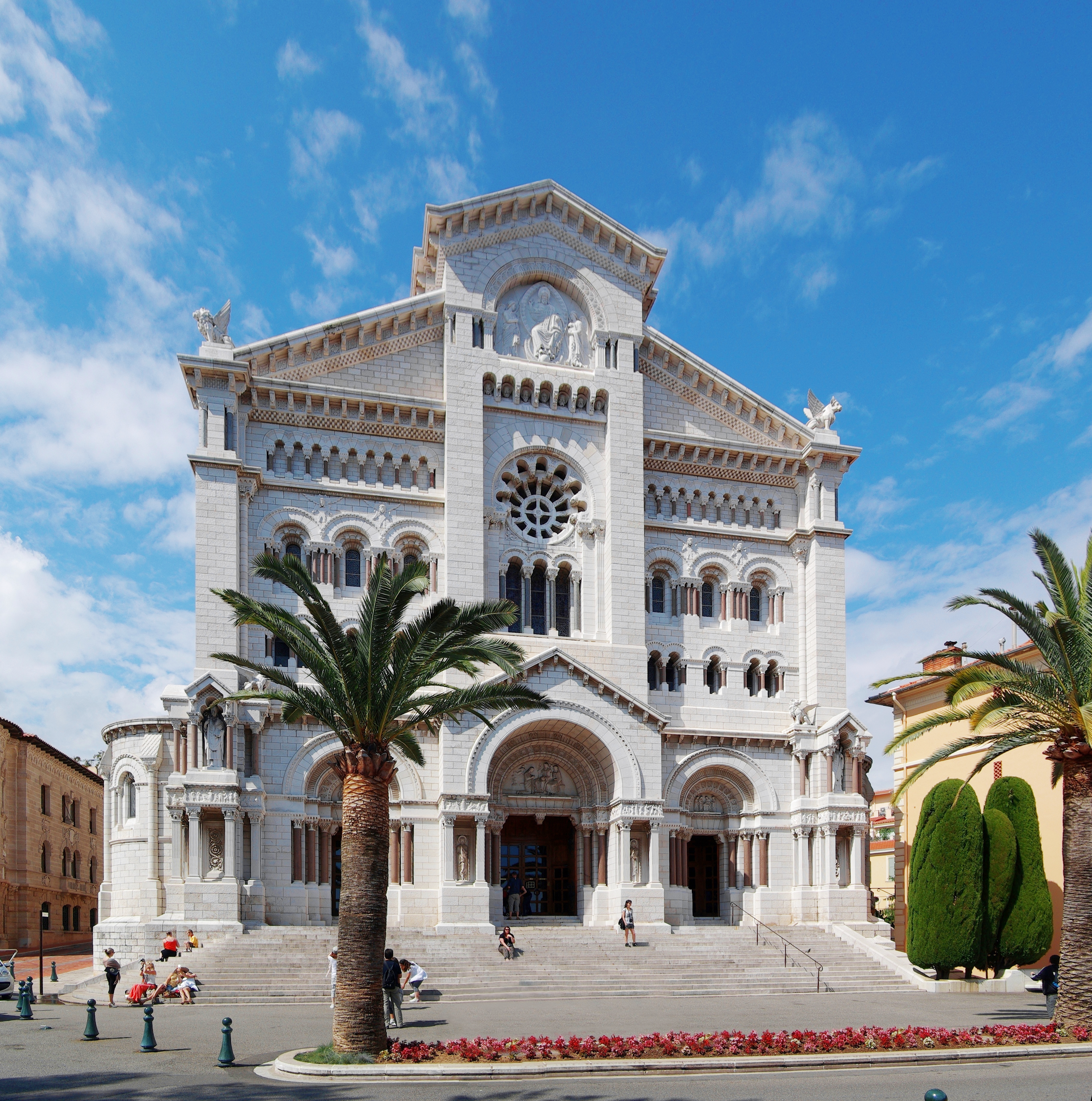
Saint Nicholas Cathedral

=== Cathedrals ===
==== Cathedral of Our Lady Immaculate ====
The Cathedral of Our Lady Immaculate, or Saint Nicholas Cathedral, or Monaco Cathedral, is an 1875 neo-Romanesque construction. The cream-coloured stone sits on a rocky spur. The cathedral holds early 16th century screens by Bréa, La Pietà and St-Nicholas.

Mediterranean influences are epitomised through the Romanesque Revival architecture style, highlighted through the white Carrara marble used to carve the episcopal throne.

=== Hotels ===
==== Hermitage Hotel ====
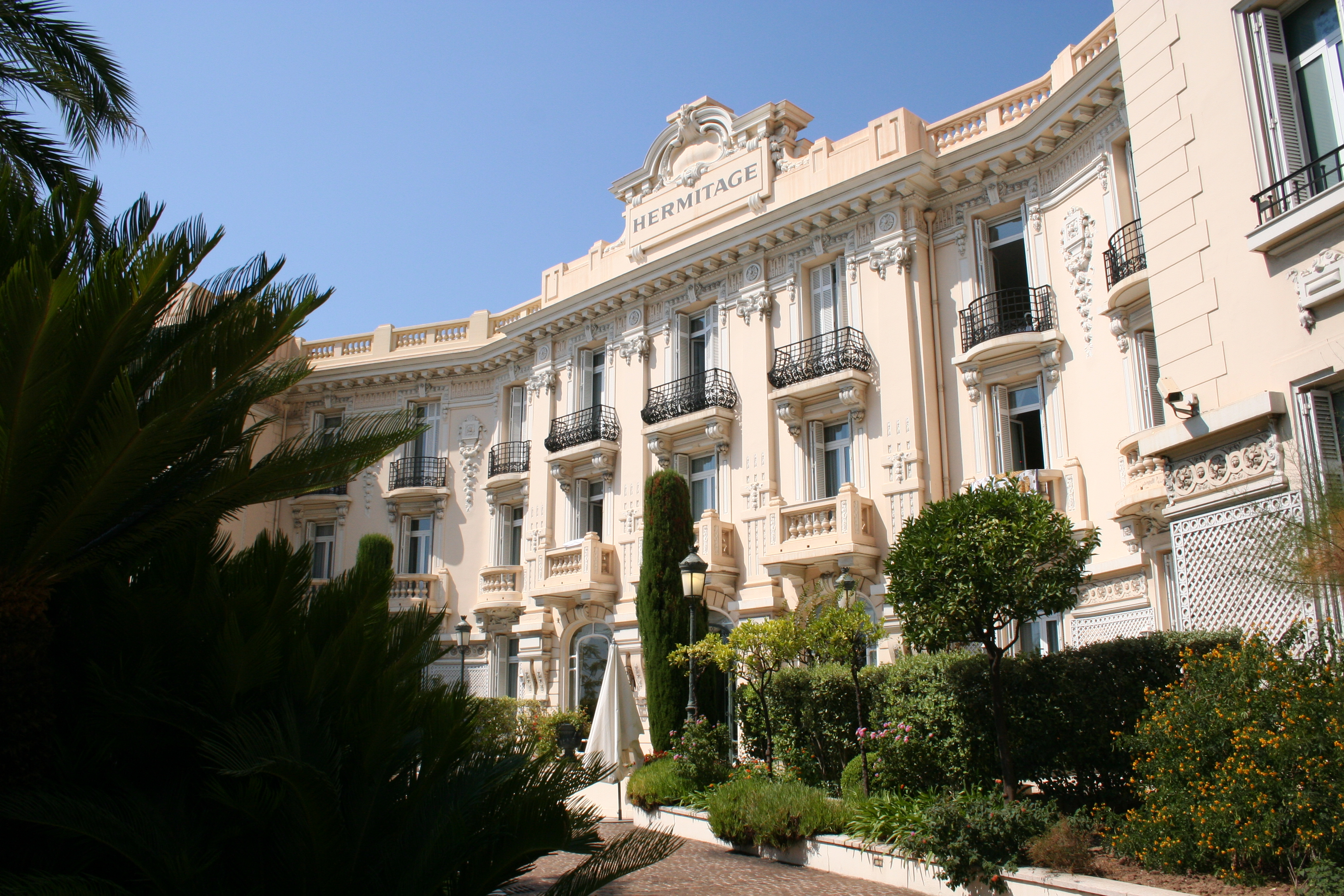
Hôtel Hermitage Monte-Carlo

Hôtel Hermitage Monte-Carlo is located at Square Beaumarchais, in the heart of Monte Carlo. It was built at the beginning of the 20th century, designed by Monegasque architect Jean Marquet. It is a large, upscale and luxurious structure, with a neoclassical edifice towards the Mediterranean Sea. The Hotel is also a famous example of the Monagasque Belle Époque movement. The features are elegant, with understated refinement. The ceiling of the dining room, which is ironically named 'Belle Époque', was designed by Gabriel Ferrier. The Jardin d'Hiver (Winter Garden) was designed and created by Gustave Eiffel, who used glass conservatory and erected disciples to combine classic authenticity and technology. The Winter Garden consists of soft pastel tones, grand lighting and a fountain.

Architect Joseph Lori renovated the Hotel, elevating it two more levels, and rejuvenating the classic Belle Époque style, in the Prince and Beaumarchais wings in particular. Following this renovation, the Hôtel Hermitage was made a 'listed building', and awarded the Renaissance Trophy for the "most elegant period decor" by the Gault and Millau Guide.

==== Hôtel de Paris Monte-Carlo ====
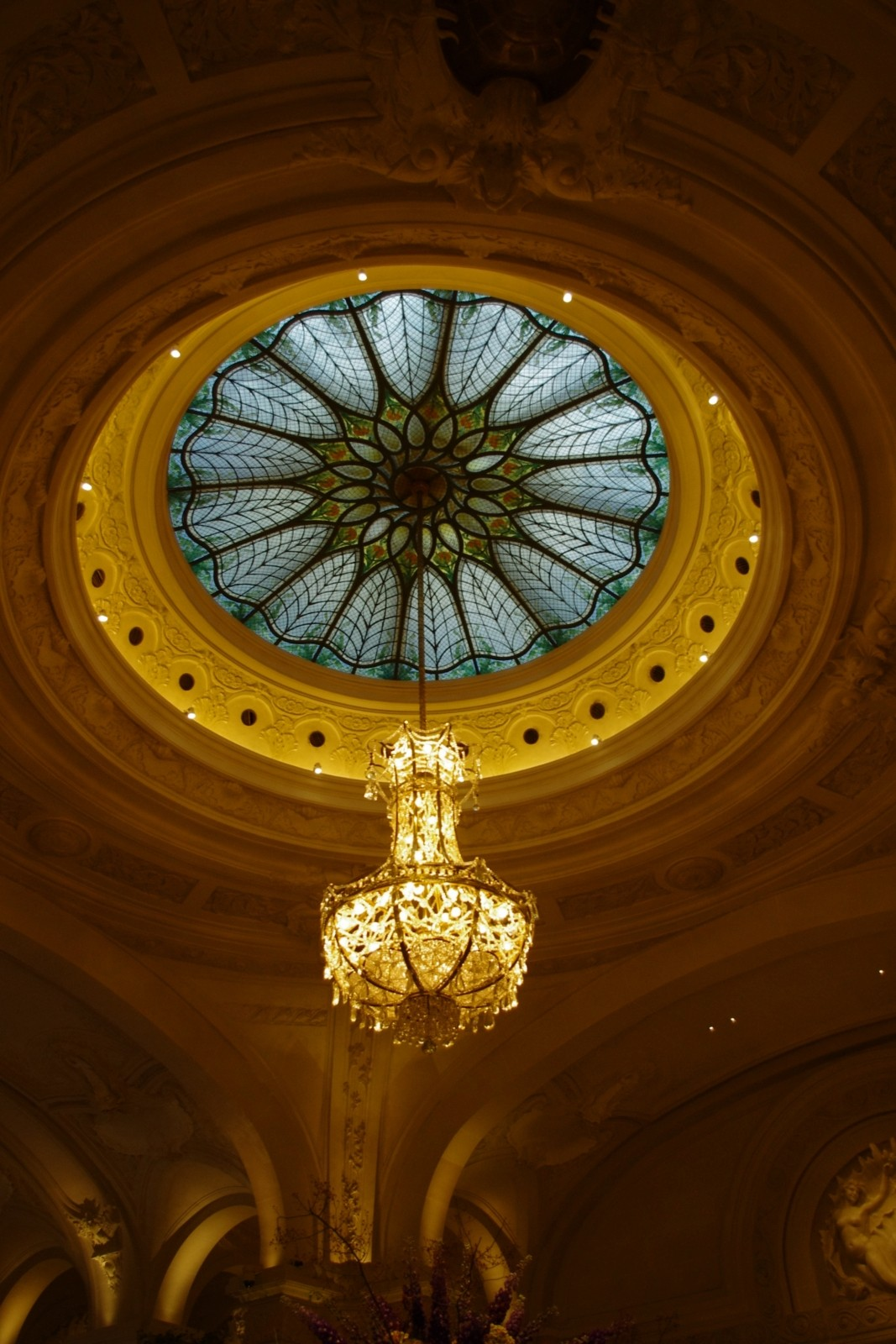
Hotel de Paris lobby ceiling

The Hôtel de Paris Monte-Carlo is a prestigious, palatial hotel. It is an international renowned luxury hotel, which includes a Michelin 3-star restaurant, Le Louis XV.

==== Monte-Carlo Casino ====
The Monte Carlo Casino is arguably the most recognisable and well-known building in Monaco. It was designed by architect Charles Garnier and built in 1866.

==== Monte-Carlo Société des Bains de Mer ====
Monte-Carlo Société des Bains de Mer, or the "Monte-Carlo Sea Bath Society", refers to the organisation which owns and operates the key modern architectural structures in Monaco, including the Casino. Founder François Blanc states:, "This place has to be about dreams, enjoyment, and beauty." The organisation is a key driver of the fantastical Capriccio and Belle Époque movements in Monaco today.

=== Museums ===
==== Oceanographic Museum ====
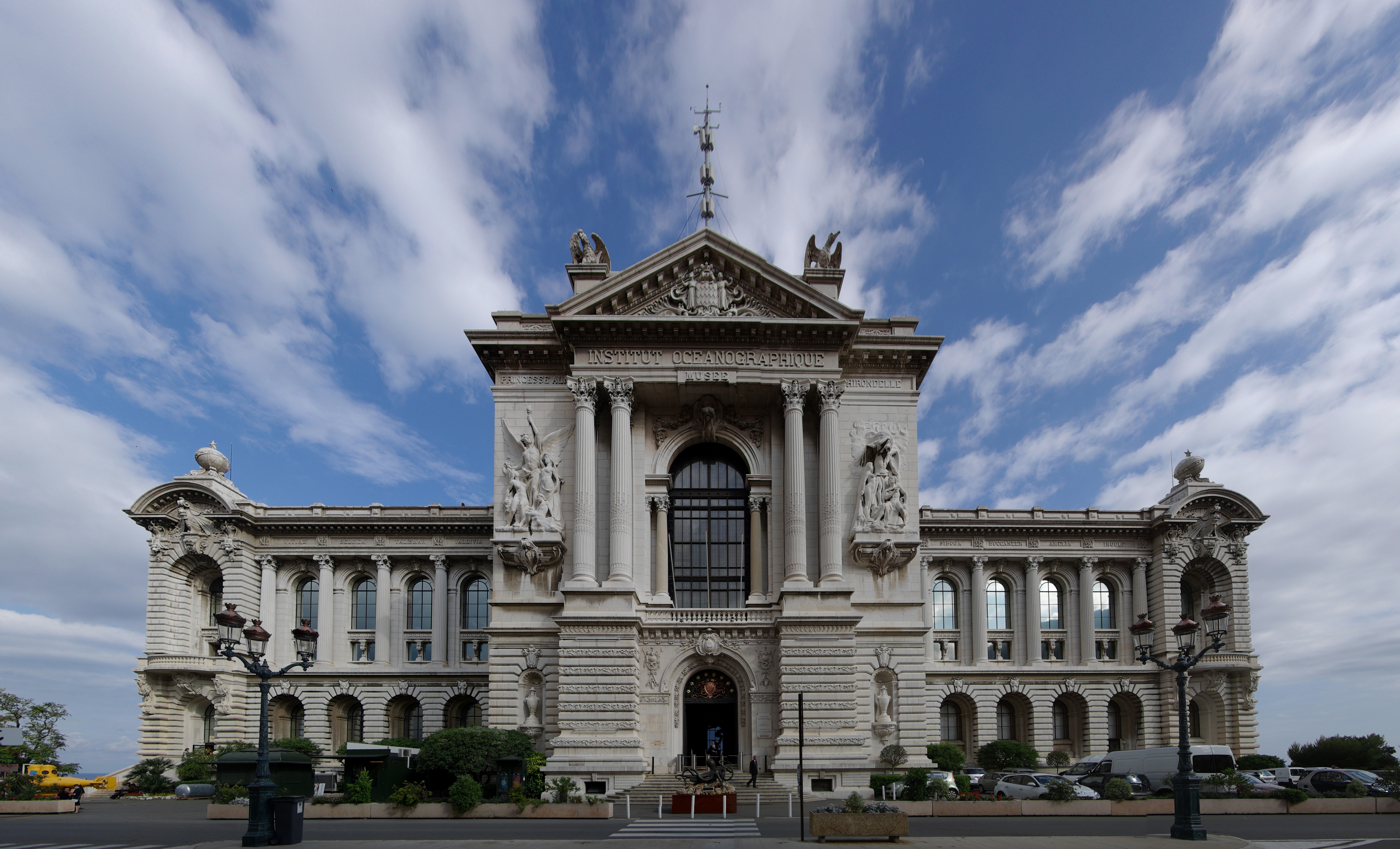
The Oceanographic Museum

The Oceanographic Museum was inaugurated in 1910 by Prince Albert I. The museum is a scientific and cultural gallery; with aquariums on the bottom floor displaying marine-flora and fauna. The museum is built into the face of a cliff, above the Mediterranean Sea. The external architecture is inspired by the oceanographic world, with sculptures representing the sea life. The museum was the first in the world to successfully kept and reproduced corals in captivity.

=== Pavilions ===
==== Monte-Carlo Pavilions ====
There are five Monte-Carlo Pavilions located between the avenue de la Costa and the place du Casino. They cover a total area of 2700 m^{2}.

The pavilions have been under reconstruction as of 2019, with the Affine Design architects aiming for complete renewal of the site, to produce a setting of entertainment and conviviality in Monaco. The pavilions are inspired by Mediterranean outdoor living, combining the old and the new, indoors and outdoors – an urban experimentation. The reconstruction is aiming to secure an 'architectural modernity' in Monte Carlo.

=== Other ===
==== Monte Carlo Train Station ====
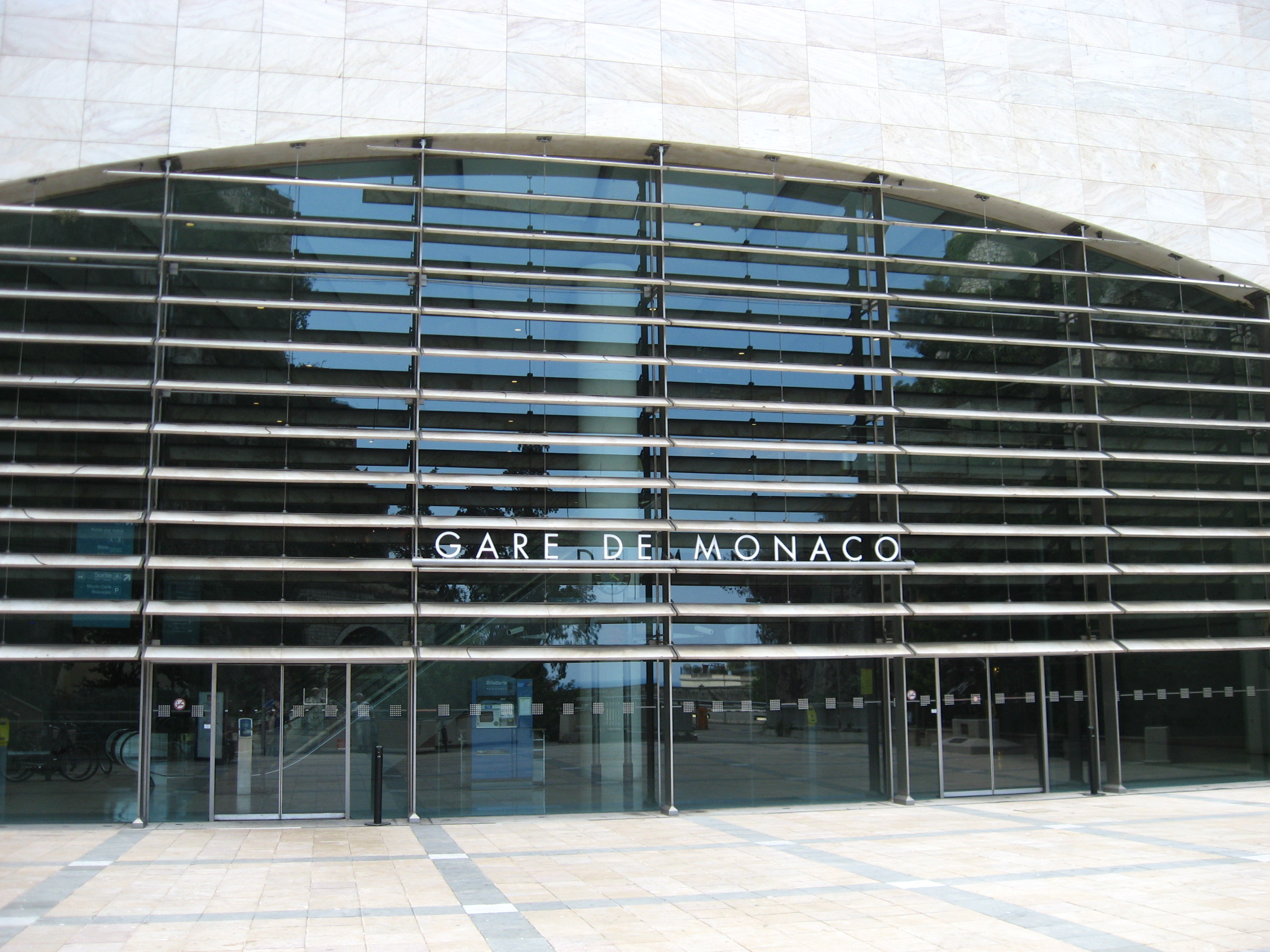
Station entrance facade

The initial construction of the railway in Monaco was a leader of the extreme economic expansion of the nation state. The Monégasque landscape, particularly through the transport system, has shifted with the growth of urban and demographic spheres in the country.

The Monaco Train Station was first opened in 1868, however has undergone reconstruction. The work was ordered by Prince Rainier III in 1958, which resurfaced the outside of the station and changed the route, crossing the Devote valley and then using a tunnel to reach the station. The station is now built into the hillside, meaning the rock and concrete combine to form the exterior. Through combining both the new and the old, the train station mirrors the merge of new Monagasque architecture and old French architecture, as well as portraying the rise of eclecticism in Monaco's architecture in the 20th century.

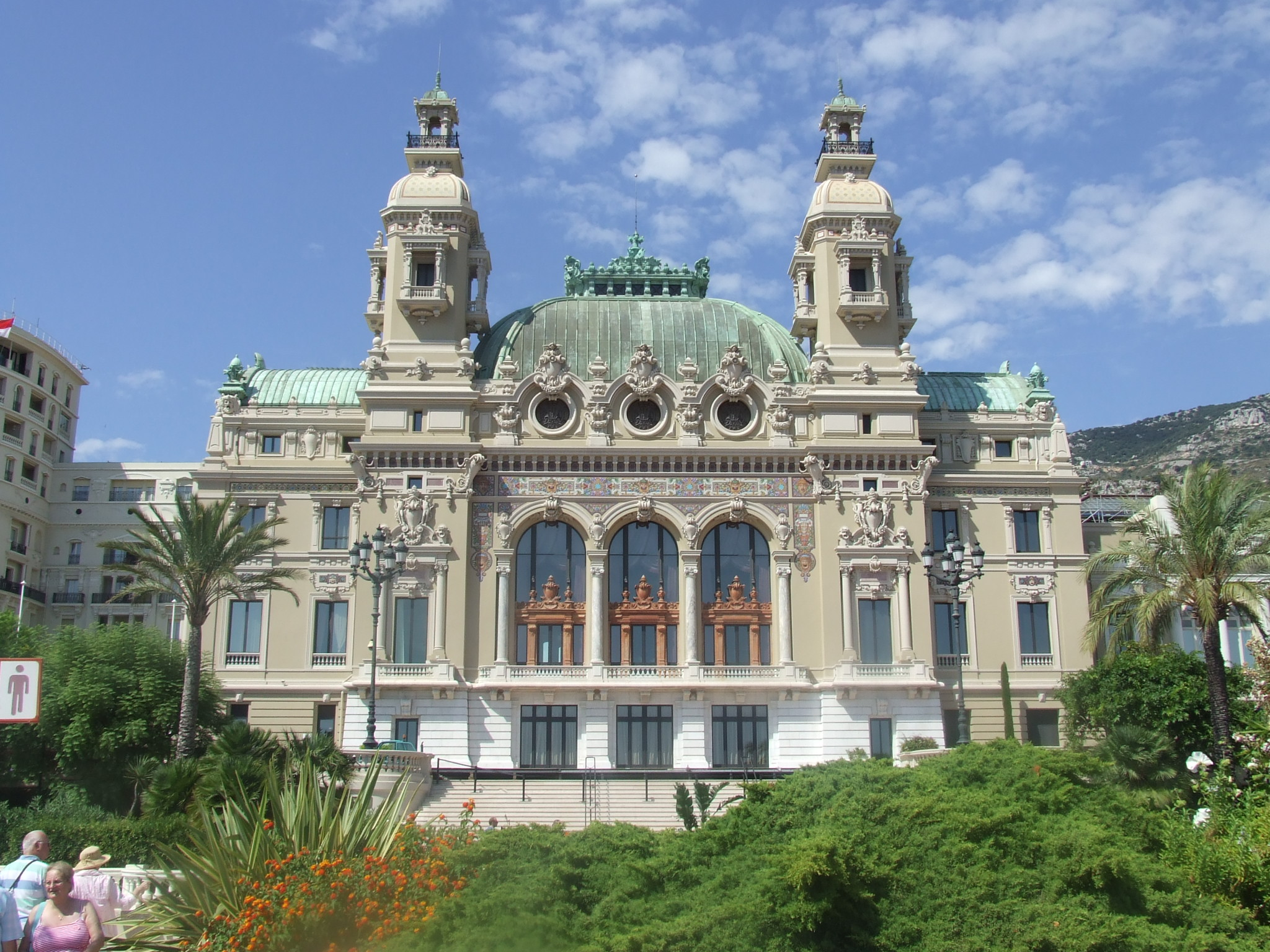
Seaside façade of the Salle Garnier, home of the Opéra de Monte-Carlo

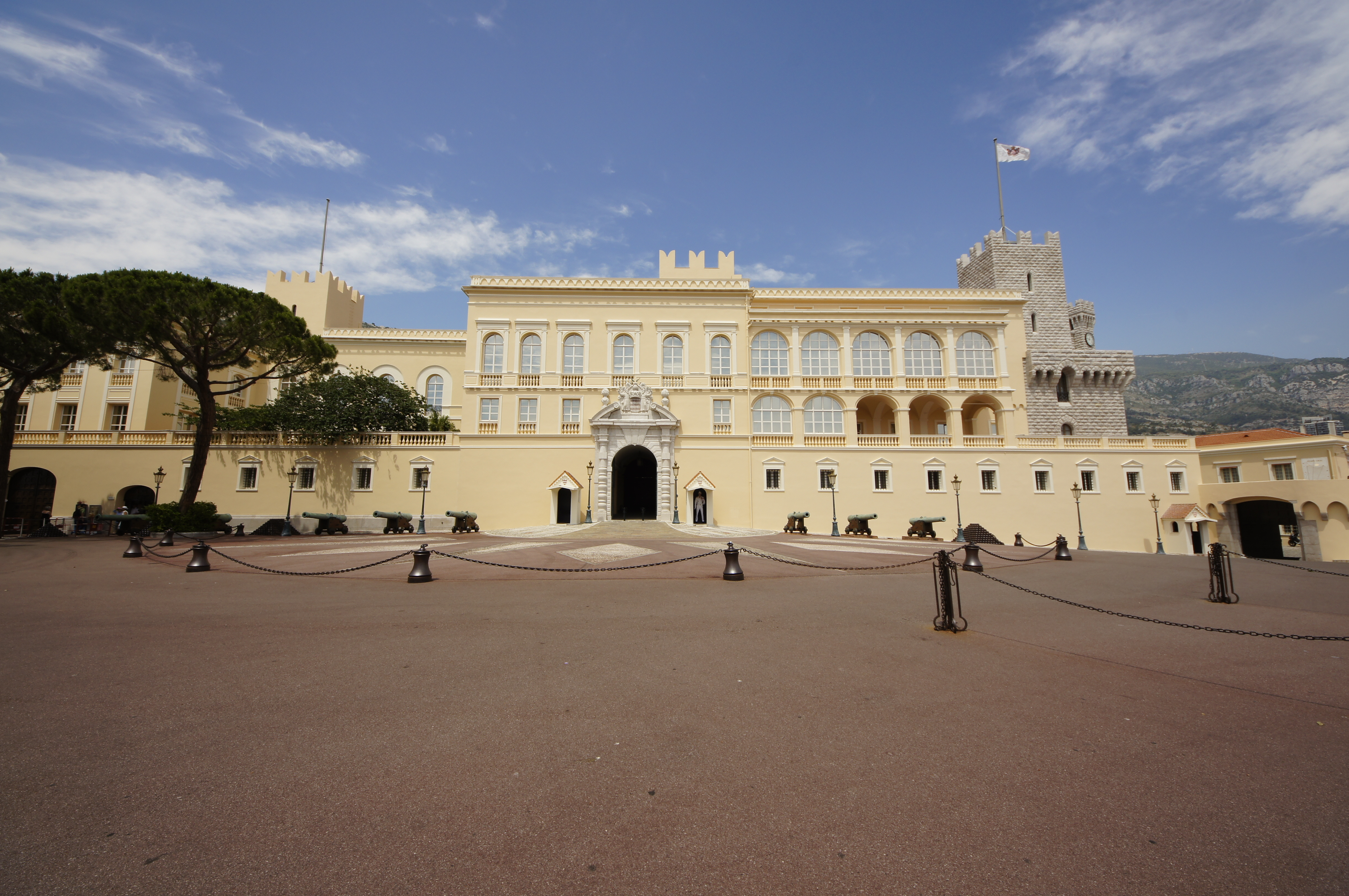
Prince's Palace of Monaco

==== Opéra de Monte Carlo (Opera House) ====
The Opéra de Monte Carlo, or the Salle Garnier, was built in 1892 and designed by Charles Garnier. The Salle Garnier was built in eight months, and consists of 524 seats. The building is neoclassical and is an extension of the Monte Carlo Casino.

==== Palais du Prince (Prince's Palace) ====
The Prince's Palace is located in Monaco's Old Town. It was built in 1191 during the Middle Ages, and therefore has significant Medieval influence, including fortress like features – such as towers and turrets. The Palace has held over seven centuries of uninterrupted sovereignty, enabling both modern and ancient architecture to exist simultaneously. There are various sections of the Palace including: the State Apartments, the York Room and the Throne Room. The State Apartments consist of frescoes from the 16th century which adorn the Mazarin Salon.

The Grimaldi family have lived in the Palace for over 700 years, and is currently home to Prince Albert II. However, the State Apartments are still open to the public in parts of the year. Through many architectural renovations and transformations, the ancient Genoese fortress has become one of the most luxurious of the 17th century and one of the multi-faceted architectural structures in Monaco. The Palace can be characterised by the stylistic choices of the Louis XIV era.

== See also ==
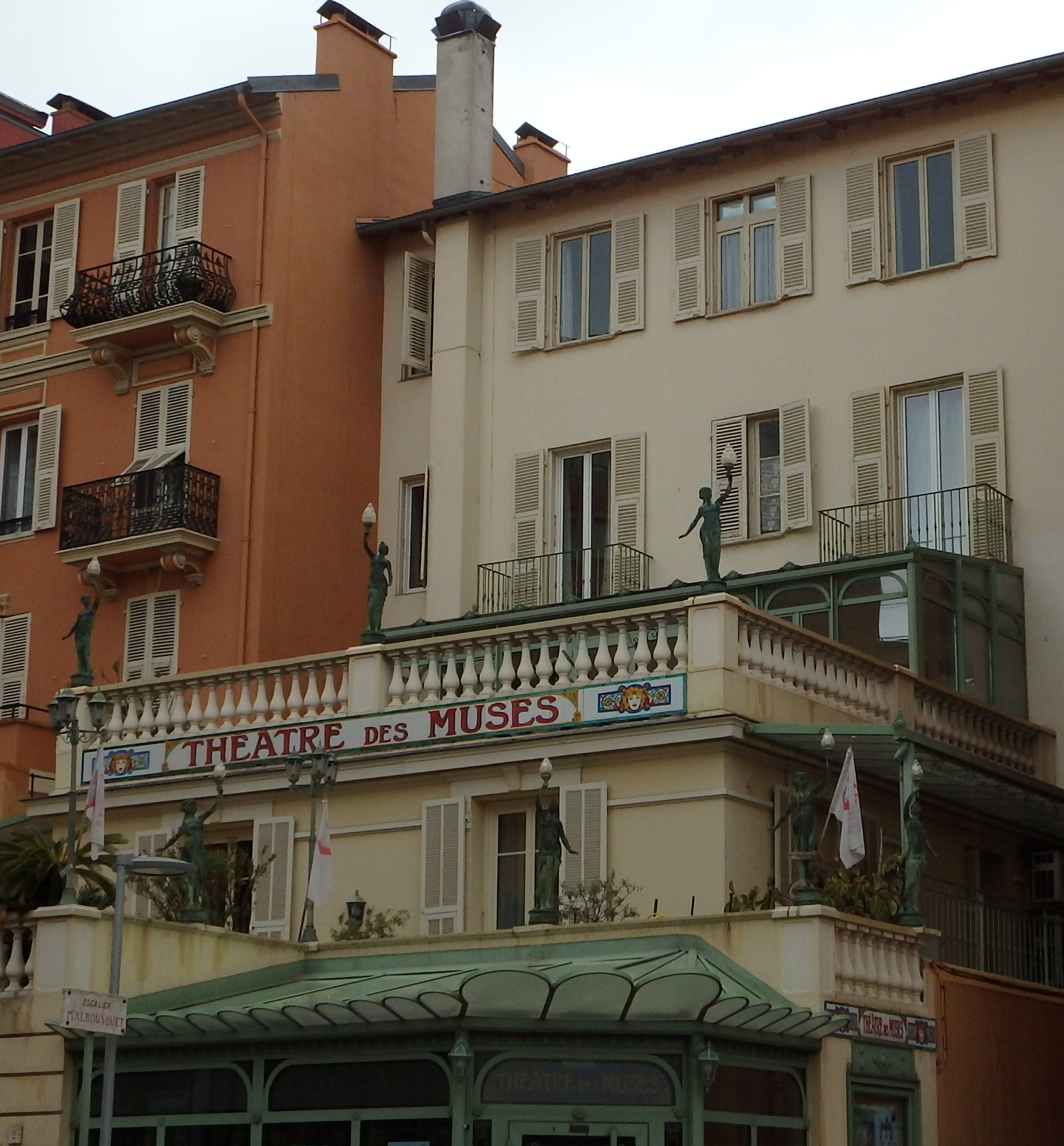
Theatre des Muses

- Outline of Monaco
