= Testimonio II =

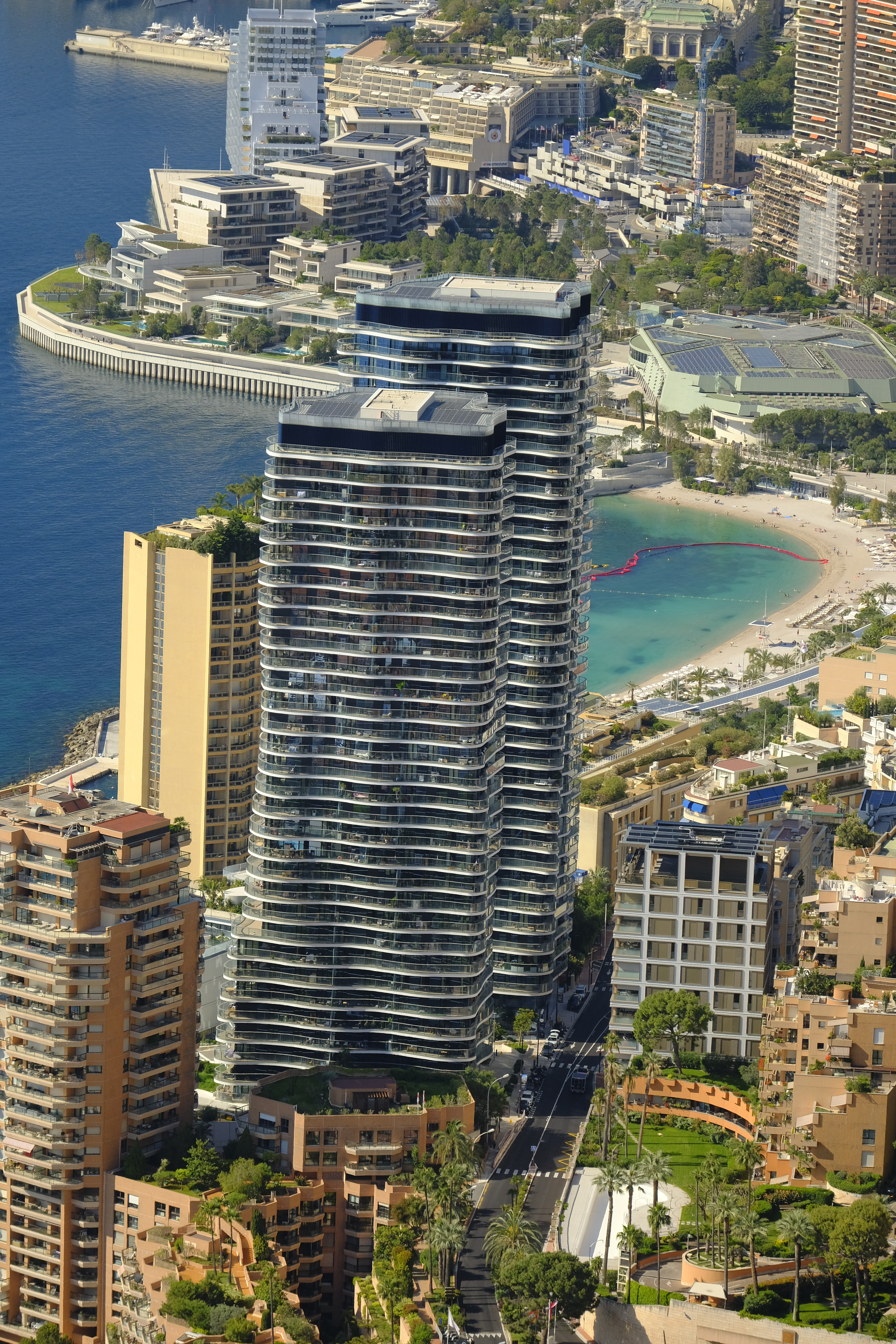
- Testimonio II in 2025
- Interactive map of the Testimonio II area

General information
- Location: La Rousse, Monaco
- Coordinates: 43°44′59.31″N 7°26′14.8″E

Design and construction
- Developer: Groupe Marzocco; Vinci Immobilier

Testimonio is a mixed-use skyscraper complex located in La Rousse, Monaco.

== History ==
The complex, designed by the architecture firm Arquitectonica and Alexandre Giraldi, was developed by Groupe Marzocco and Vinci Immobilier following a tender process initiated by the Monegasque government, which culminated in the formalization of agreements in 2015. Construction began in 2017 and was completed with the final handovers in 2024.

== Description ==
Covering more than 150,000 square meters, the development consists of two slender residential towers, 27 and 30 stories high, known as the Elsa Tower and the Reseda Tower. The towers are primarily dedicated to state-regulated housing and comprise approximately 350 apartments.

They rise from a shared podium that accommodates the private luxury residential component of the project, known as Bay House, which includes 56 apartments and five villas. Each villa features a rooftop garden and a private swimming pool.

The base of the complex also houses the new facilities of the International School of Monaco, a 50-place kindergarten, and a 13-level multi-story parking garage providing more than 1,100 parking spaces.

The development is characterised by glass façades, expansive panoramic terraces, and landscaped green spaces at the ground level. It was conceived to combine high residential density, public amenities, and architectural quality within Monaco's coastal urban environment.
