= Trams in Monaco =

Tram system in Monaco

Overview
- Locale: Monte Carlo; Monaco
- Transit type: Tram
- Number of lines: 3

Operation
- Began operation: 1898
- Ended operation: 8 May 1931
- Operator(s): Compagnie des Tramways de Monaco (Later absorbed by Tramways de Nice et du Littoral)

Technical
- System length: 5.1 km (3.2 mi)

The first tramway in Monaco was built by a collaboration between the Compagnie des tramways de Monaco (TM), created in 1897 by Henri Crovetto, a Monegasque entrepreneur who operated a rental car company, and the Thomson-Houston Electric Company.

== History ==
Prior to the formation of the Compagnie des tramways de Monaco, the Société Nouvelle des Tramways de Nice - later the Tramways de Nice et du Littoral (TNL) - attempted but were unable to build their own line connecting Nice and Menton via Monaco, as Monaco was outside of French jurisdiction.

The tramways were tested on 27 March 1898 and went well. Despite an accident on 11 April, the inauguration took place three days later, with Prince Albert I and authorities of the Principality attending the ceremony.

The company received permission for several lines:

- Place d'Armes - Saint Roman, opened on 14 May 1898
- Gare de Monaco - Place du Gouvernement, opened on 11 March 1899
- Casino - Gare de Monte-Carlo, opened on 3 May 1900

The trams were powered using surface contact, making operating them somewhat unreliable. If the contacts were not live, the trams were unable to move, however sometimes the contacts remained live after a tram had already passed, causing injury to both pedestrians and horses alike. In 1900 the TM and TNL networks were connected and, with encouragement from the TNL, the surface contacts were replaced by overhead wires in 1903, with the poles and cables being installed by the Thomson-Houston Electric Company between August and 5 November that year. Two days later, the line between Nice and Monte-Carlo opened. Also in that year, the line from Casino - Gare de Monte-Carlo was withdrawn.

In 1909 TM was ordered to be absorbed into TNL by Prince Albert I. On 8 May 1931, following the increase in preference towards automobiles, an agreement was signed between the Monegasque government and the TNL to end the use of the tramways as soon as new buses became available.

== See also ==
- Rail transport in Monaco
