= Rail transport in Monaco =

Railway map of Monaco. The present-day station is indicated by the light-green dot.

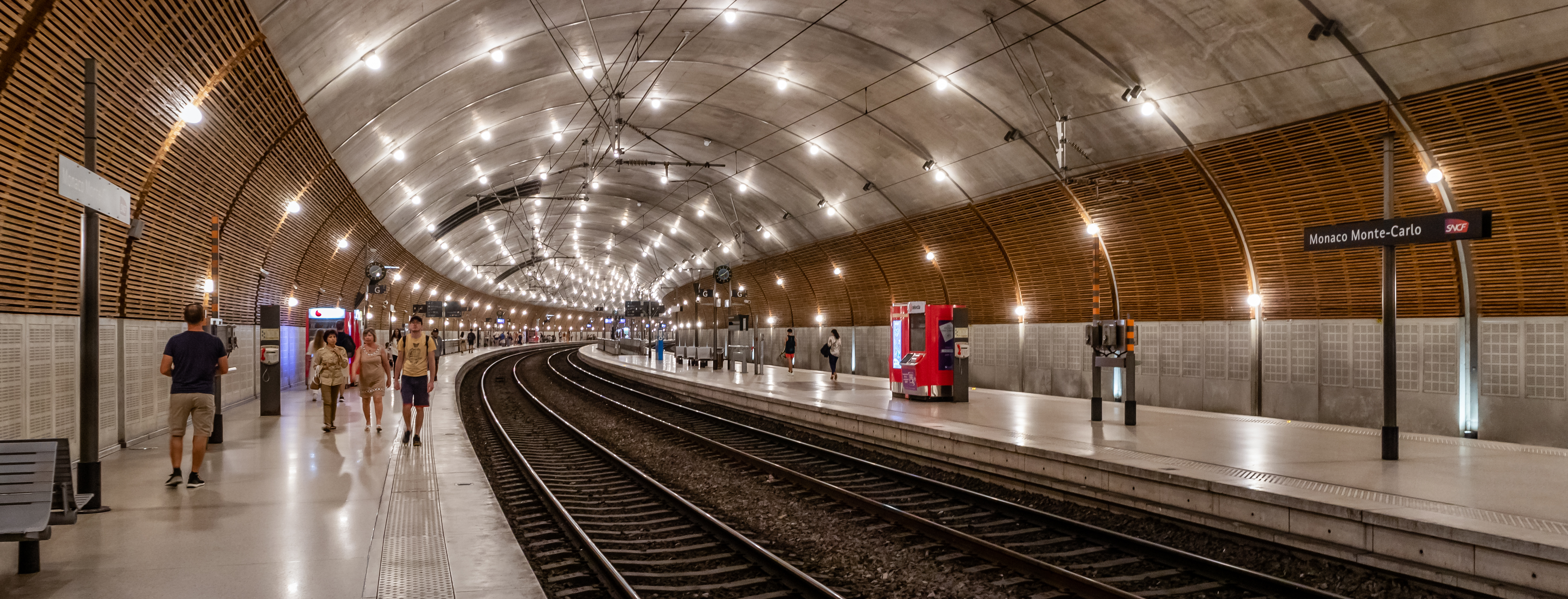
View of Monaco-Monte Carlo station

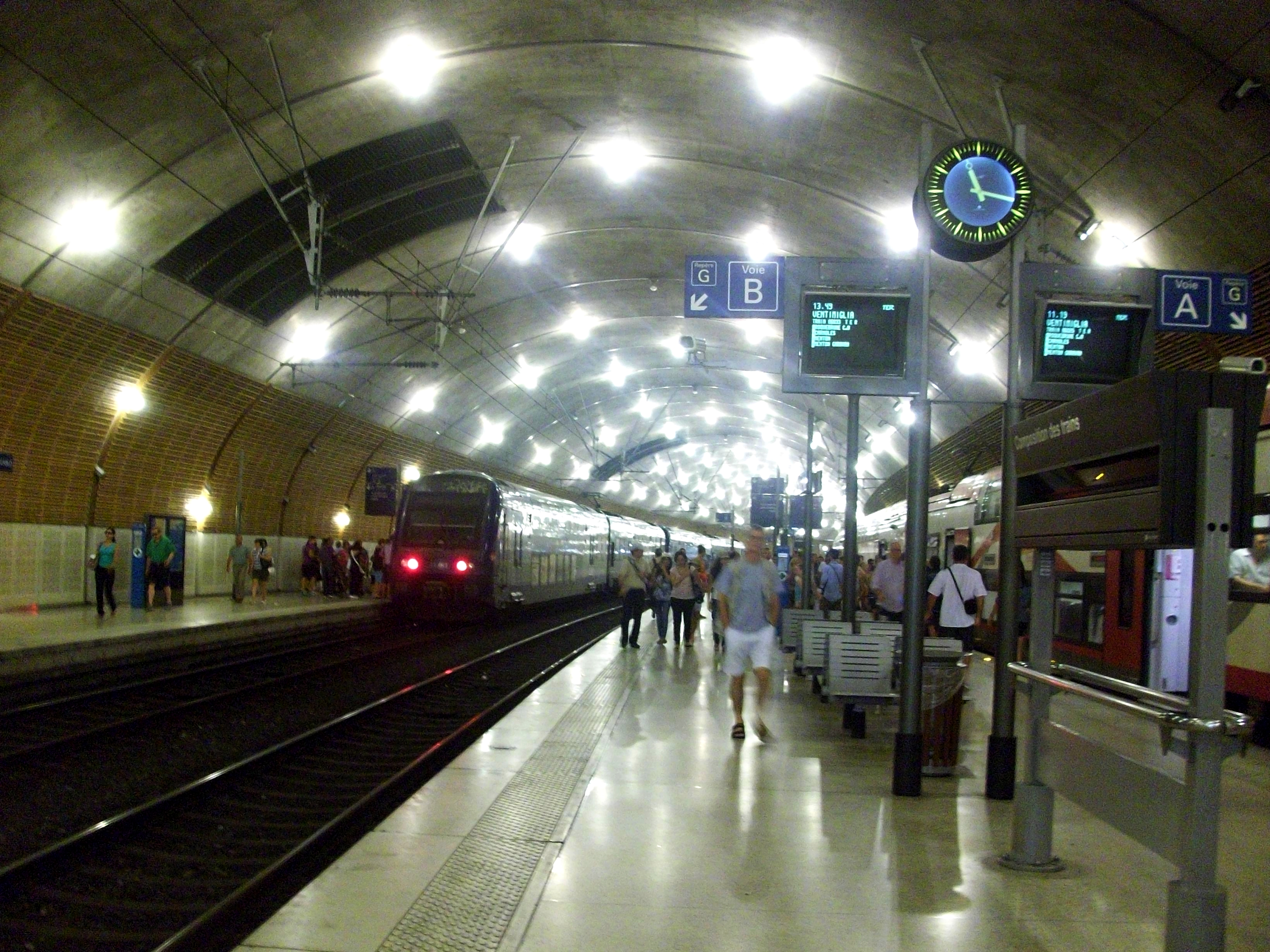
Train waiting in Monaco-Monte Carlo

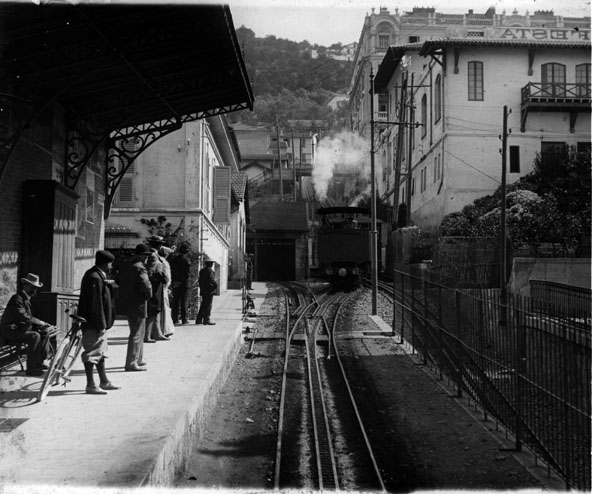
Monte Carlo station of La Turbie-Monte Carlo railway (1905)

The Principality of Monaco has currently a single railway station, Monaco - Monte Carlo, part of the Marseille–Ventimiglia railway line. The station was originally opened in 1867, but extensively rebuilt in 1999. The length of railway within the Principality is 1.7 km (1.1 mi), giving Monaco the third-smallest railway system in the world.

== History ==
=== Overview ===
Originally, two stations served the principality on the Marseille-Nice-Ventimiglia line: Monaco and Monte Carlo. A new tunnel was built in the 1950s through the hills behind Monte Carlo, bypassing the Monte Carlo station and causing its closure. Subsequently, the Monaco station was renamed Monaco-Monte Carlo station.

In the 1990s, the railway line was re-routed completely underground. A new underground station was built to replace the old surface station. The new Monaco - Monte Carlo station was opened on 7 December 1999.

=== Disused lines ===
A rack railway from La Turbie to Monte Carlo through Beausoleil operated from 1894 to 1932, with a station (Monte Carlo) serving the Principality.

Monaco also had a tramway system between 1898 and 1931, with the first line linking Place d’Armes to Saint Roman.

== System ==
Monaco does not operate its own train service; all rail services in the Principality are operated by the French operator, SNCF. SNCF trains leave the Monaco - Monte Carlo station every 15 minutes throughout the day, although services cease during early, and late hours.

The railway station is located on the border of Moneghetti, Monaco and Beausoleil, France, near the Monégasque administrative ward of Saint Michel.

== Railway stations ==
The table below shows the Monegasque stations, the existing one and the disused ones:

Station	Line	Opened	Closed	Location
Monaco-Monte-Carlo	Marseille-Nice-Ventimiglia	1999	in service	43°44′19″N 7°25′9″E
Monte Carlo (rack railway)	La Turbie-Monte Carlo	1894	1932	43°44′29.2″N 7°25′30.2″E
Monte Carlo (SNCF)	Marseille-Nice-Ventimiglia	1868	1958	43°44′19.17″N 7°25′44.74″E
Monaco	Marseille-Nice-Ventimiglia	1868	1999	43°43′57″N 7°25′02″E

== See also ==
- Transport in Monaco
