= Monte-Carlo Pavilions =

Temporary commercial buildings in Monaco

- Interactive map of the Monte-Carlo Pavilions area

General information
- Status: Demolished
- Architectural style: Googie architecture
- Location: Monaco
- Construction started: 2013
- Completed: 2014
- Demolished: 2018
- Cost: 17 million Euros
- Owner: Société des Bains de Mer

Design and construction
- Architects: Chérif Jahlan; Richard Martinet
- Developer: Bouygues

The Monte-Carlo Pavilions, also known as the Pavillons des Merveilles and the Pavillons des Boulingrins, were five temporary commercial buildings in Monaco.

== Location ==
The pavilions were located in the Boulingrins Gardens, near the Sporting d'Hiver and the Place du Casino.

== History ==
The pavilions were built as temporary shops for luxury stores by the Société des Bains de Mer (SBM) for the duration of construction work along the Avenue des Beaux-Arts. The SBM invested 17 million in their construction. The construction firms were Richelmi and Acieroid, two subsidiaries of Bouygues. Construction began in 2013, and they were completed in 2014.

The pavilions were built with aluminum panels made by the firm Bertuli, and designed in the Googie style by architects Chérif Jahlan and Richard Martinet. Landscape architect Jean Mus also worked on the layout. The buildings resembled beach pebbles, with a footpath between them that looked like a river. Building sizes ranged "from 220 to 600 square metres each, reaching a maximum of 10 metres in height".

The tenants were Alexander McQueen, Akris, Balenciaga, Bottega Veneta, Boucheron, Chanel, Chopard, Czarina, Lanvin, Miu Miu, Piaget, Sonia Rykiel, Stardust, Yves Saint Laurent, and Zendrini. By October 2014, two out of the five buildings were empty due to the steep rent.

The buildings were demolished in 2018, once the construction work on the Avenue des Beaux-Arts had ended.
