= Monaco–Monte-Carlo station =

Railway station serving the Principality of Monaco

Monaco Monte-Carlo
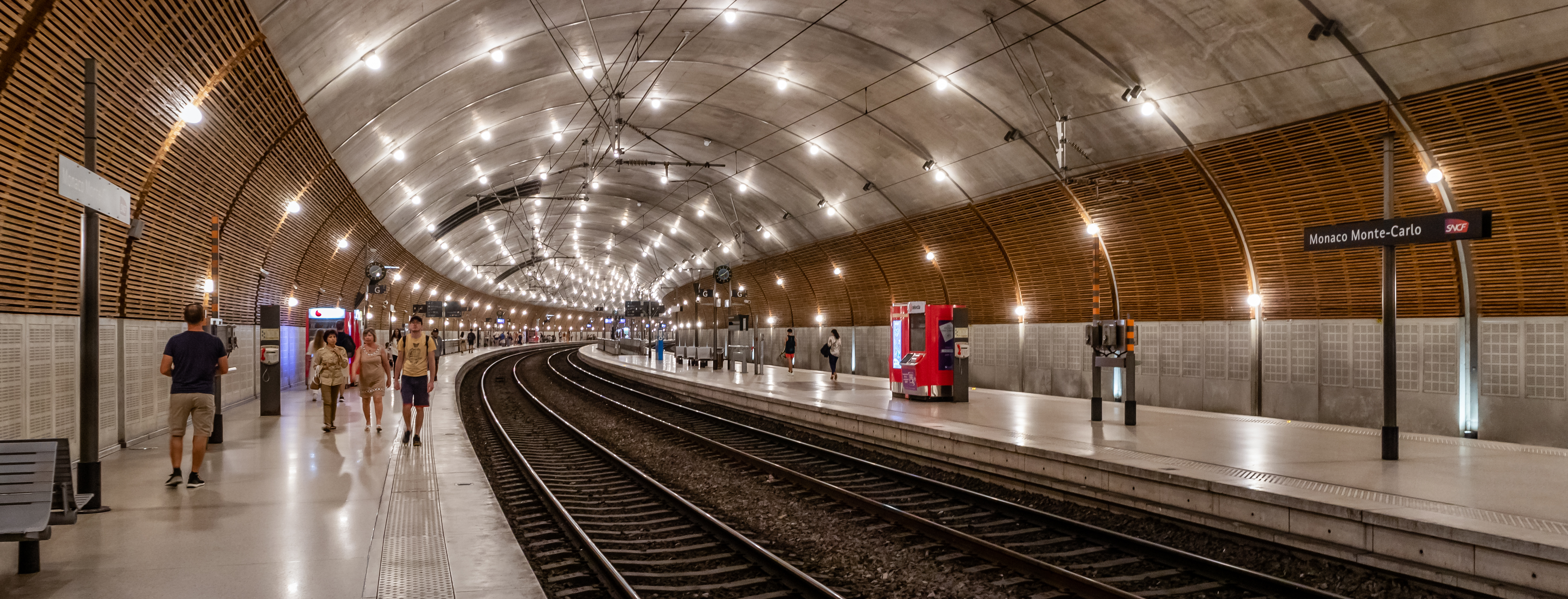
- New underground platforms, 2019

General information
- Location: La Condamine, Monaco; Beausoleil, France
- Coordinates: 43°44′19″N 7°25′09″E
- Owner: SNCF
- Operator: SNCF
- Line: Marseille–Ventimiglia railway
- Platforms: 2
- Tracks: 3

History
- Opened: 7 December 1999

Passengers
- 2024: 9,224,149

Services
Preceding station	SNCF	Following station
Nice-Ville towards Paris-Lyon	TGV inOui Seasonal service	Menton Terminus
Preceding station	TER PACA	Following station
Cap-d'Ail towards Mandelieu-la-Napoule or Grasse	4	Cap-Martin-Roquebrune towards Ventimiglia
Location

Monaco-Monte-Carlo station (French: Gare de Monaco-Monte-Carlo; Monégasque: Staçiun de Munegu-Munte-Carlu) is the sole railway station in the Principality of Monaco, though part of it is located in Beausoleil, France. It is served by trains of the French state-owned operator SNCF, on the Marseille–Ventimiglia railway line. The station, along with the entire railway line in the principality, is located underground.

== History ==
The railway line from Marseille reached Monaco in 1868. The first station in the Principality, originally named Monaco (Gare de Monaco), was located in La Condamine. The following year, a second station named Monte Carlo (Gare de Monte-Carlo), was opened in Monte Carlo quarter, directly below the Monte Carlo Casino. The first station in La Condamine was later renamed Monaco-Monte-Carlo (Gare de Monaco-Monte-Carlo) in the 1950s, after the building of a new tunnel bypassing the second station in Monte Carlo, which was closed in 1965. The idea to relocate the railway and bypass Monte Carlo station was conceived by Rainier III to reclaim valuable land for development.

In the early 1990s, it was again decided to re-route the railway (this time, completely underground) and build a new station back closer to the center of Monaco. Construction commenced in 1993 on the station in the ward of Ravin de Sainte-Dévote; the new station opened on 7 December 1999, replacing the former surface Monaco-Monte-Carlo station from then on. This comprises a curved tunnel 466 metres (1,529 ft) in length, 22 metres (72 ft) wide and 13 metres (43 ft) in height. There are three tracks through the station (accessed from a side platform on the south side) and an island platform between the two tracks to the north.

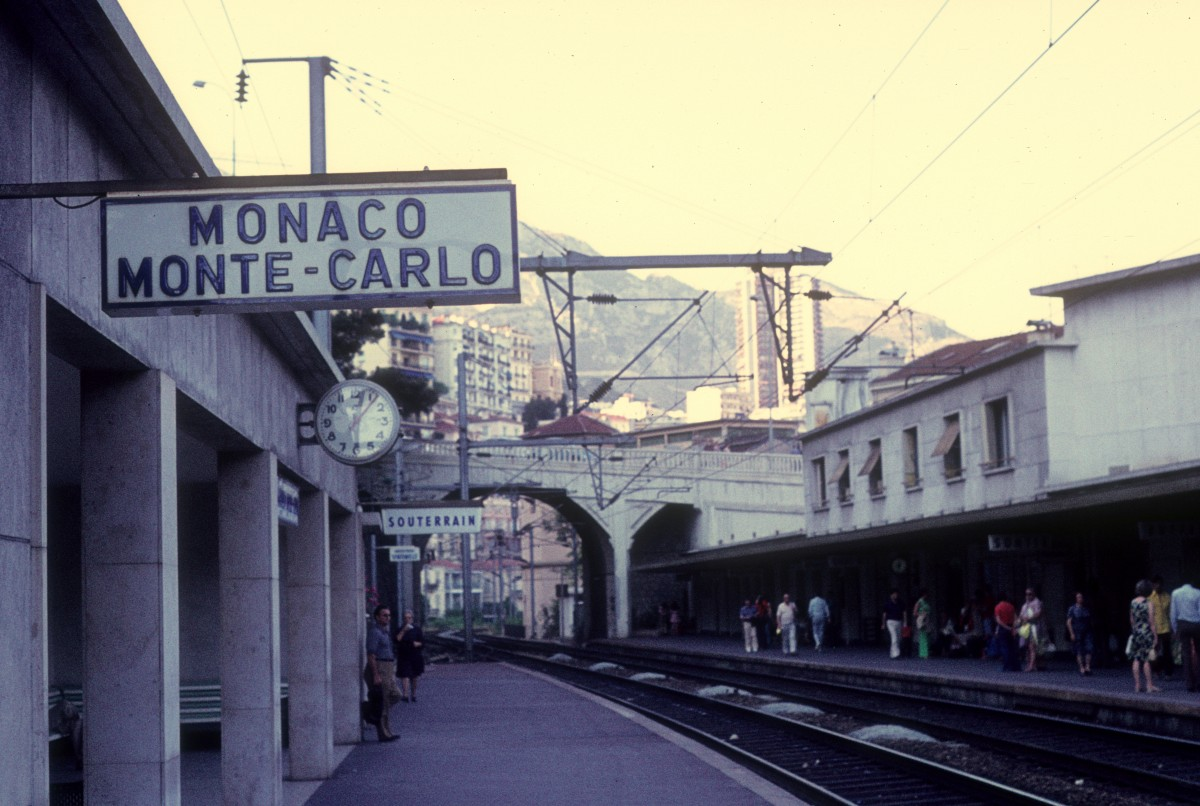
Old surface platforms (1974). This station is indicated by blue dots on the map.

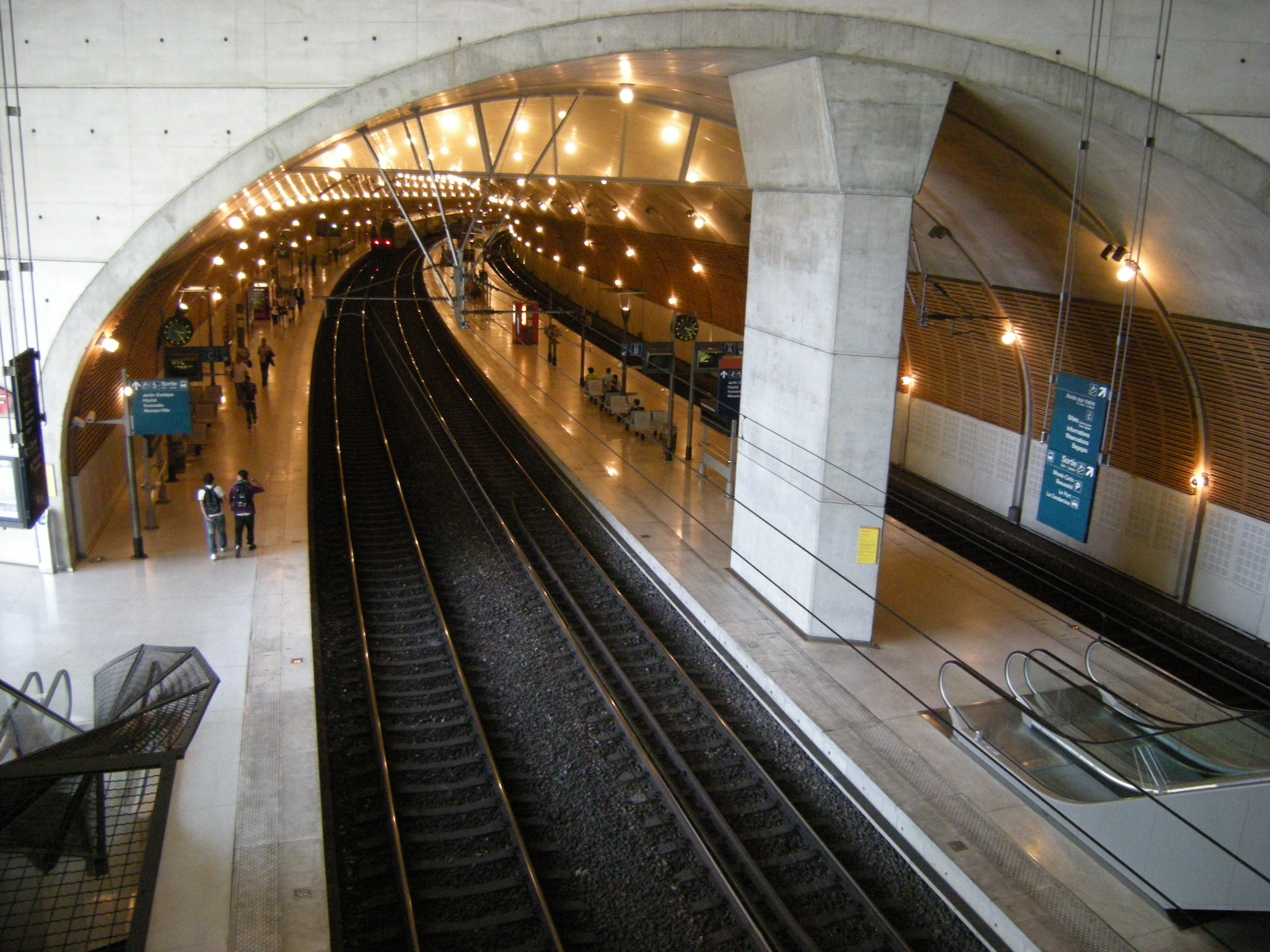
Current station interior

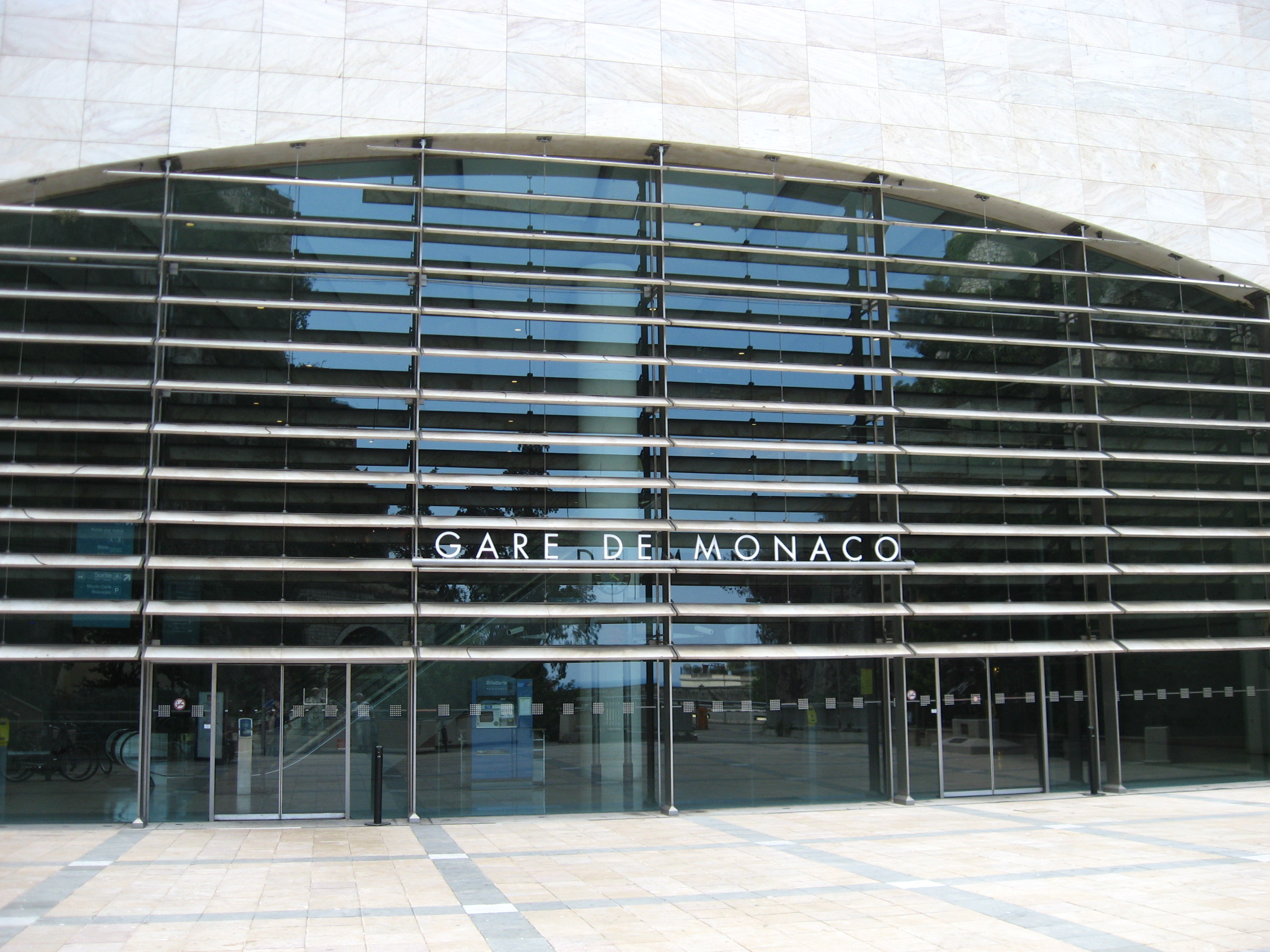
Lower entrance to the current station

Railway stations in Monaco. The present-day station is indicated by light-green dots.

== Monte-Carlo Country Club halt ==
A single platform halt is located at the eastern end of the Monaco tunnel, over the Monaco border in Roquebrune-Cap-Martin, France. It provides access to the Monte-Carlo Country Club (also itself located in France) and is only operational during the Monte Carlo Masters tennis tournament each April. It is served by TER services between Cannes and Ventimiglia. Its platform is located on the southern side of the line.

== Train services ==
The majority of trains serving Monaco-Monte-Carlo are local TER Provence-Alpes-Côte d'Azur services between Marseille-Saint-Charles and Ventimiglia in Italy, close to the France–Italy border. There are also a small number of TGV services from the Gare de Lyon in Paris.

The station is served by the following services:

- High speed services (TGV) Paris – Avignon – Cannes – Nice – Menton
- Local services (TER Provence-Alpes-Côte d'Azur) Grasse – Cannes – Nice – Monaco – Ventimiglia

== See also ==
- Rail transport in Monaco
- List of SNCF stations in Provence-Alpes-Côte d'Azur
