= La Rousse =

La Rousse A Russa (Monégasque)
- Ward of Monaco
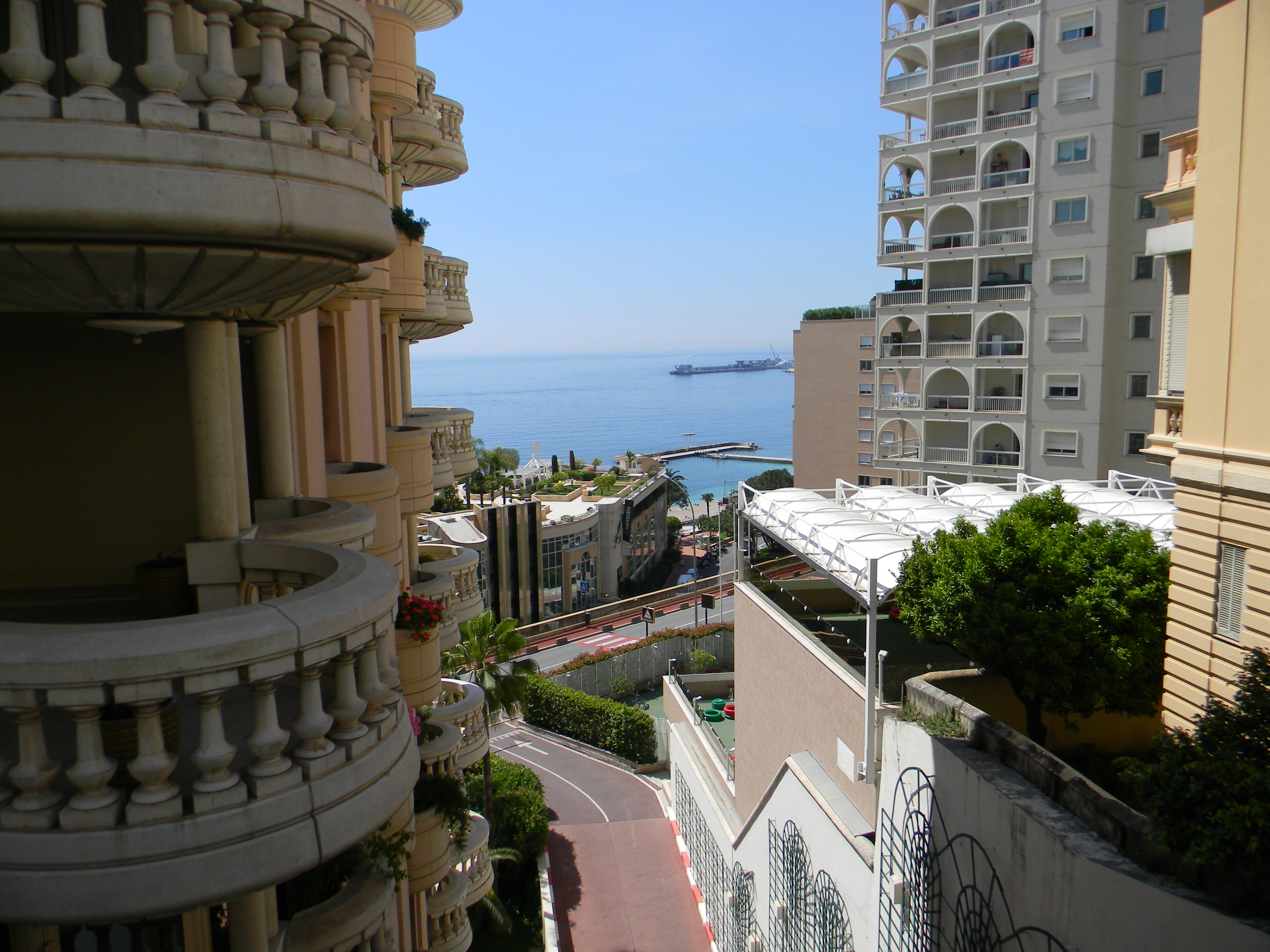
- A view of the Mediterranean in La Rousse

- Location in Monaco
- Coordinates: 43°44′04″N 7°25′15″E
- Country: Monaco

Area
  - Total: 0.176888 km^{2} (0.068297 sq mi)

Population (2008)
  - Total: 3,102
  - Density: 17,536/km^{2} (45,420/sq mi)

La Rousse (French pronunciation: [la ʁus]; Monégasque: A Russa), also formerly known as La Rousse-Saint Roman (until 2013), is the northernmost ward in the Principality of Monaco. La Rousse is incorporated in the traditional quarter of Monte Carlo. Since 2018, it is home to a police station near the border with France.

== Geography ==
La Rousse is an administrative constituency; previously, it was a subdivision of the traditional district of Monte Carlo. It is the seventh district of Monaco. It is located near the Larvotto area. In 2008 it had 3,102 inhabitants, according to the census.

It covers an area of 17.68 hectares or 0.1768 square kilometres. La Rousse is bordered by the France to the north and east, Saint Michel and Monte Carlo to the south, and Larvotto to the south and west. It has no direct access to the Mediterranean Sea.

== Landmarks ==
La Rousse is a residential community. Tour Odéon, a mixed-use development, is located on Avenue de l'Annonciade. At 170 m, Tour Odéon is the tallest structure in Monaco.

== Notable residents ==
- Chris Froome (professional road cyclist) (United Kingdom) (Kenya)
- Vadym Iermolaiev (assassinated Ukrainian oligarch) (Ukraine)

== See also ==
- Municipality of Monaco
- Geography of Monaco
