= Amelia (ship) =

Several ships have borne the name Amelia:

- Dutch ship Aemilia (1632) was Admiral Maarten Tromp's flagship during part of the Eighty Years' War.
- Amelia (1795 ship) was a ship launched in 1787 in France that the British captured. Under her British owners she made one voyage as a whaler and one voyage as a slave ship. She is last listed in 1806.
- Amelia (1796 ship) was a ship built in Demaun that the French Navy captured in 1796 as Amelia was carrying rice to Britain.
- Amelia (1800), of 200 tons (bm), was a government transport built in Bristol that a French privateer captured in 1800, and that the Guernsey privateer cutter Maria recaptured and sent into Gibraltar. She was captured a second time and this time her captors took her into Algeciras.
- Amelia (1813 ship) was built in Massachusetts in 1809 probably under another name. The British captured her in 1813 and she was a British merchantman until she foundered in 1829.
- Amelia (1816 ship) was a ship that disappeared in 1816 after leaving Sydney for China.
- Amélia IV was a passenger ship built in 1900, and Royal yacht for the Portuguese monarch until 1910.

== See also ==
- Amelia Wilson (1809 ship) was built in France under another name and captured by the British in 1809. Her new owners renamed her and she became a West Indiaman. She later became a whaler and was wrecked in 1833 on her fifth whaling voyage.
- HMS Amelia - any one of four ships of the Royal Navy, with a fifth planned
- Yacht Amélia – any one of four vessels
