= List of museums in Monaco =

This list of museums in Monaco contains museums which are defined for this context as institutions (including nonprofit organizations, government entities, and private businesses) that collect and care for objects of cultural, artistic, scientific, or historical interest and make their collections or related exhibits available for public viewing.

Name	Image	District	Type	Summary	Coordinates
Monaco Top Cars Collection		La Condamine	Automobile	A collection of historic cars assembled by Prince Rainier III of Monaco.	43.7354011°N 7.4218114°E
Museum of Old Monaco		Monaco-Ville	Monegasque heritage		43°43′53.43″N 7°25′32.27″E
Museum of the Chapel of Visitation		Monaco-Ville	Art	A collection of Old Master paintings in a former Roman Catholic chapel.	43°43′52.98″N 7°25′31.89″E
Museum of Prehistoric Anthropology		Les Révoires	Anthropological		43°43′58″N 7°24′49.65″E
Museum of Stamps and Coins		Fontvieille	Numismatic and philately		43°43′51.13″N 7°25′3.51″E
New National Museum of Monaco		Les Révoires and Monte-Carlo	Modern art		43°43′57.54″N 7°24′49.3″E (Villa Paloma); 43°44′39.9″N 7°25′49.65″E (Villa Sauber)
Oceanographic Museum		Monaco-Ville	Aquarium/Oceanography		43°43′50.29″N 7°25′32.29″E
Monaco Naval Museum		Fontvieille	Naval museum		43°43′48.51″N 7°25′0.24″E

== See also ==
- Category:Visitor attractions in Monaco
- List of museums
