= Oceanographic Museum of Monaco =

Museum of marine sciences in Monaco-Ville, Monaco

Coordinates: 43°43′51″N 7°25′31″E

- Musée océanographique de Monaco
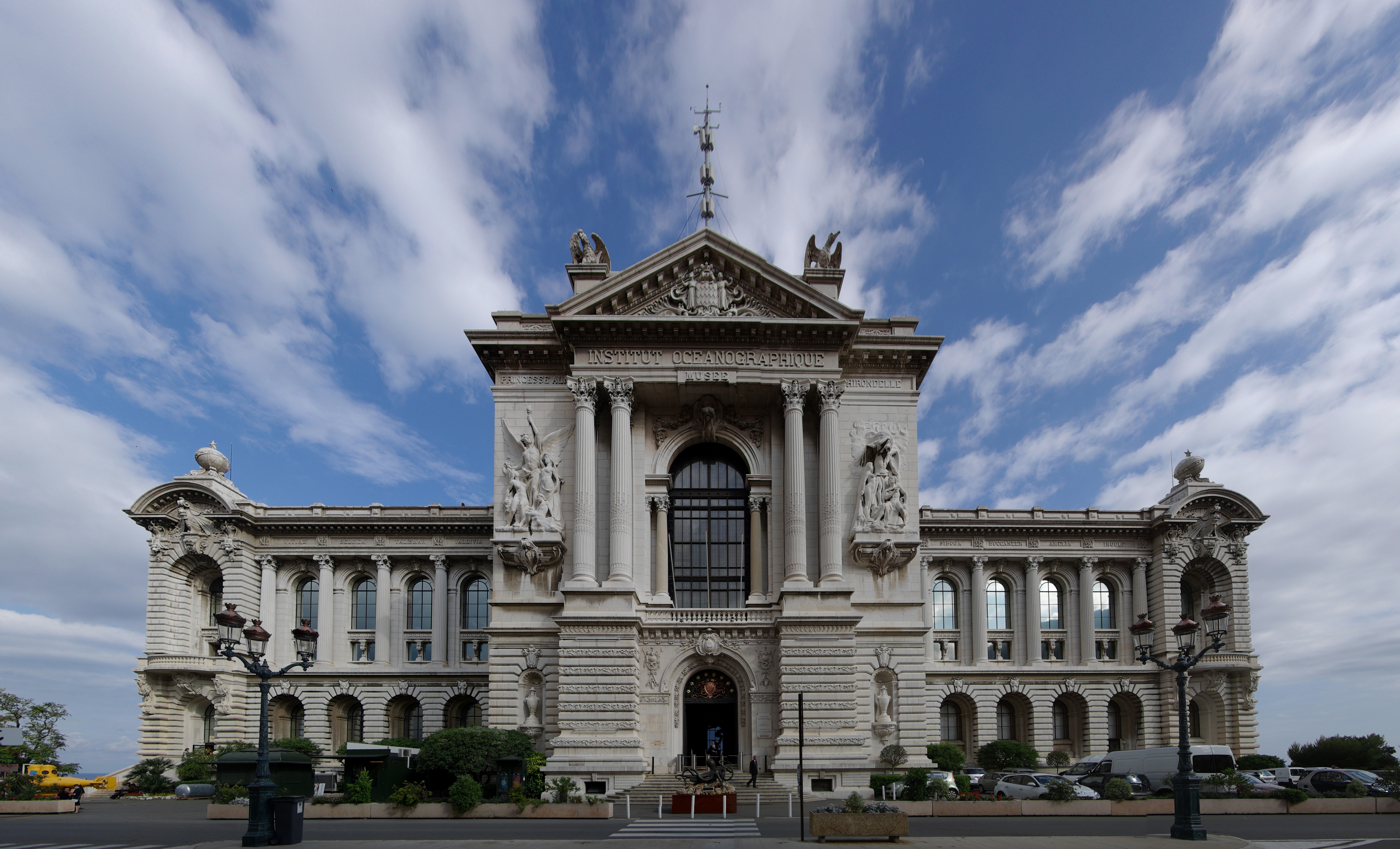
- Exterior of the Museum
- Established: 1910
- Location: Le Rocher, Monaco
- Type: Oceanographic museum, Historic site
- Website: www.oceano.mc

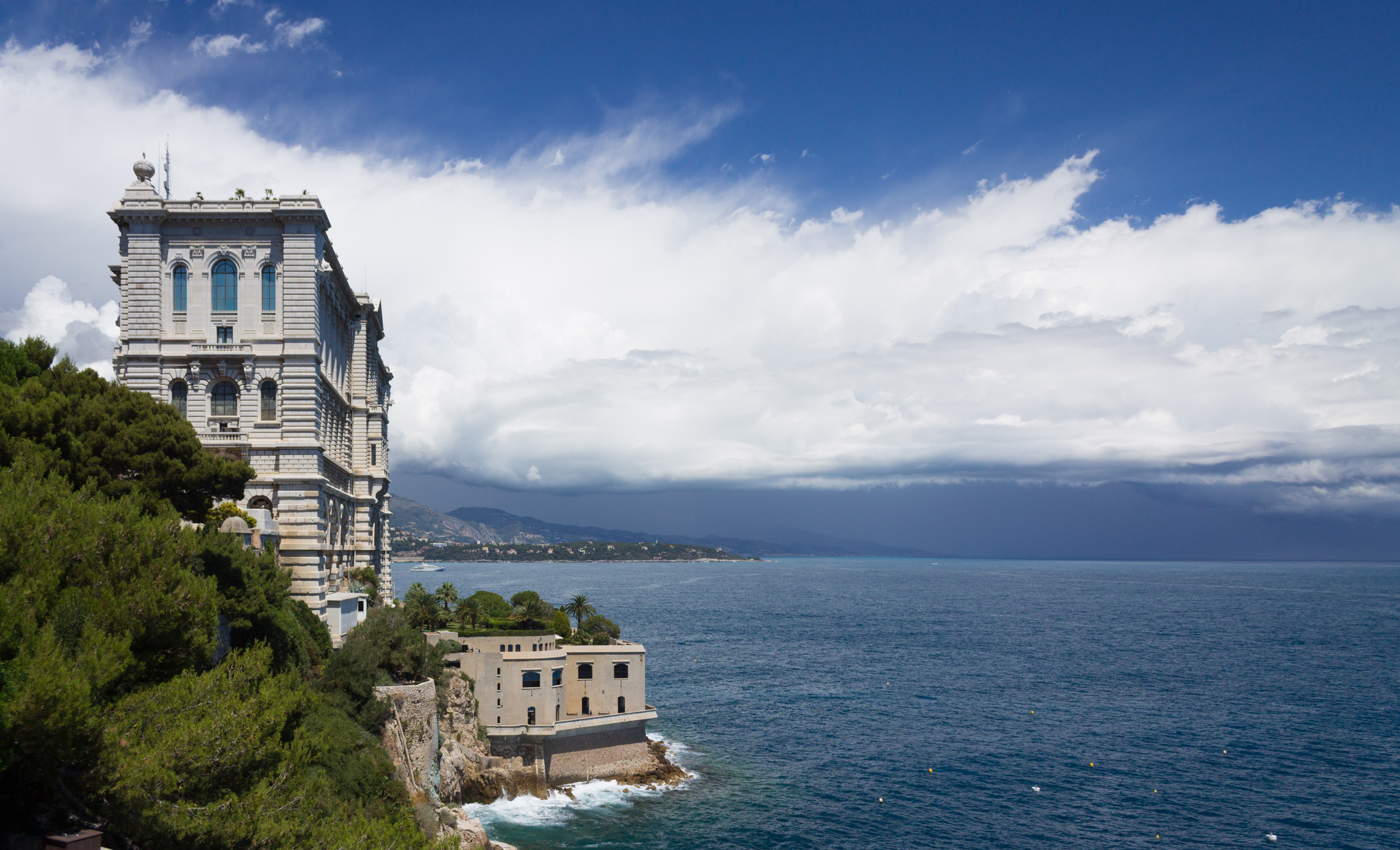
The building rises from the cliffside rock.

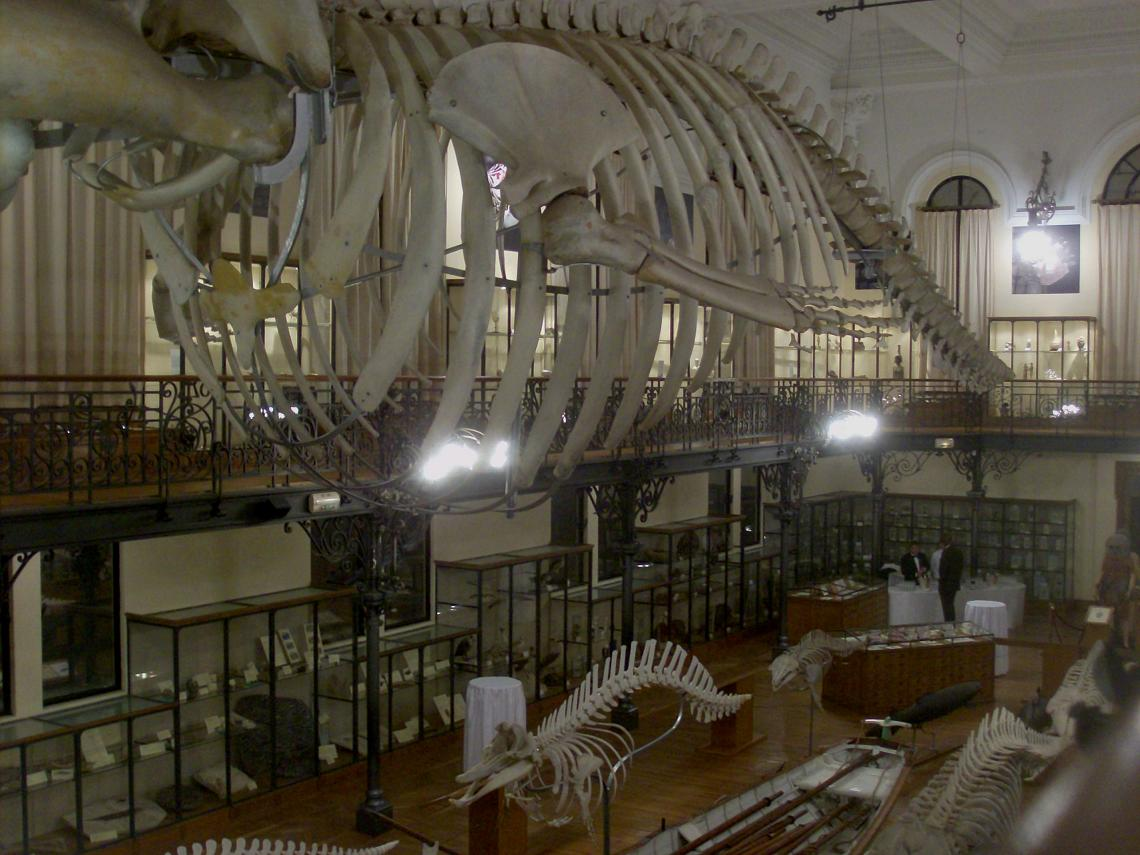
A view of the interior of the museum

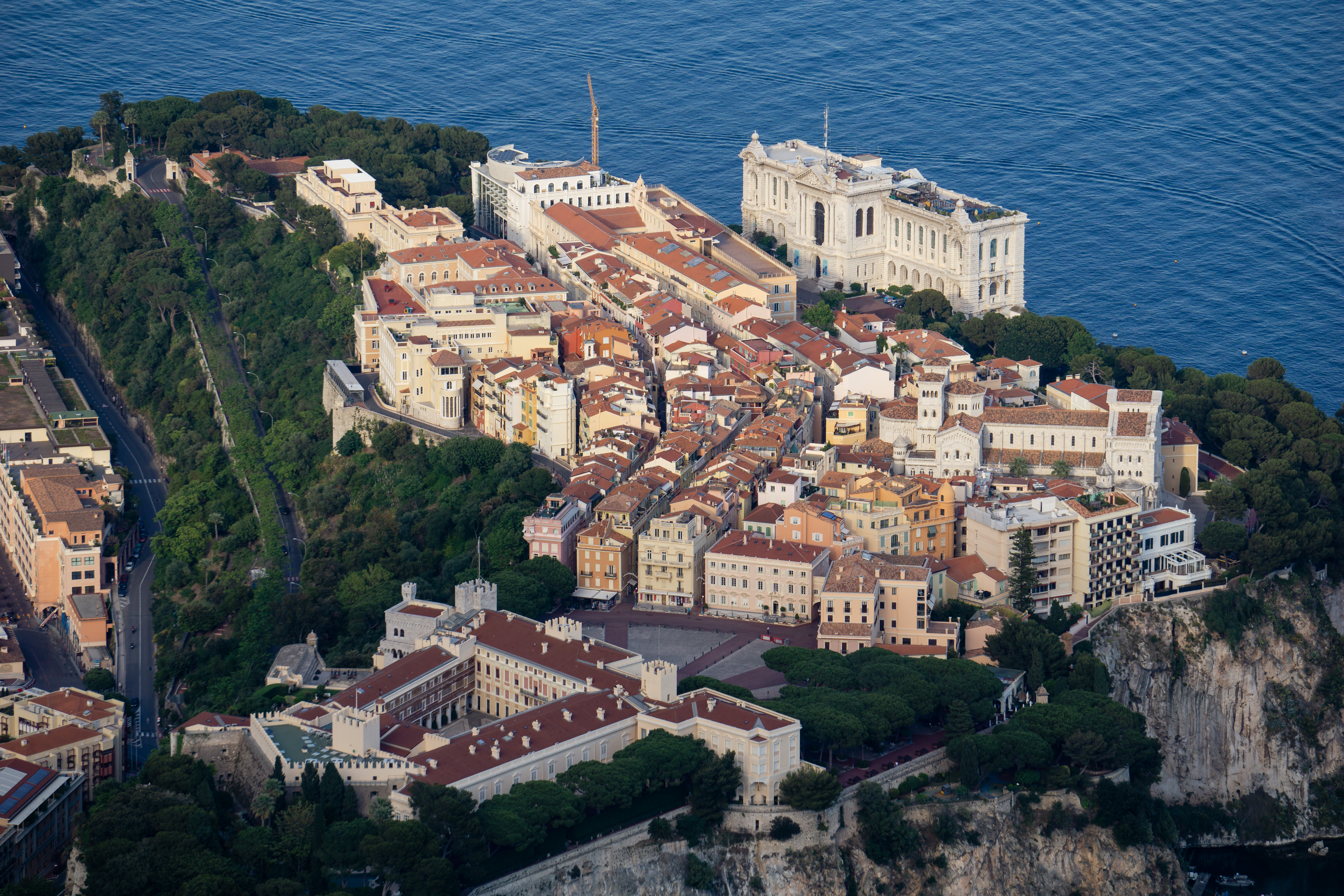
Aerial view of the Rock with the museum

The Oceanographic Museum (French: Musée océanographique), is a museum of marine sciences in Monaco City, Monaco. This building is part of the Institut océanographique, which is committed to sharing its knowledge of the oceans.

== History ==
The Oceanographic Museum was inaugurated in 1910 by Monaco's modernist reformer Prince Albert I, who invited to the celebrations not just high officials and celebrities but also the world-leading oceanographers of the day to develop the concept of a future Mediterranean Commission dedicated to oceanography, now called Mediterranean Science Commission. Jacques-Yves Cousteau was director from 1957 to 1988. The Museum celebrated its centenary in March 2010, after extensive renovations.

== Overview ==
The museum is home to exhibitions and collections of various species of sea fauna (starfish, seahorses, turtles, jellyfish, crabs, lobsters, rays, sharks, sea urchins, sea cucumbers, eels, cuttlefish etc.). The museum's holdings also include a great variety of sea related objects, including model ships, sea animal skeletons, tools, weapons etc., as well as a collection of material culture and ritual objects made from, or integrating materials such as pearls, molluscs and nacre.

At the first floor, A Sailor’s Career showcases the work of Prince Albert I. It includes the laboratory from L’Hirondelle, the first of Prince Albert's research yachts. Observations made there led to an understanding of the phenomenon of anaphylaxis, for which Dr Charles Richet received the Nobel Prize in Physiology or Medicine in 1913.

An aquarium in the basement of the museum presents a wide array of flora and fauna. Four thousand species of fish and over 200 families of invertebrates can be seen. The aquarium also features a presentation of Mediterranean and tropical marine ecosystems.

Numerous artists display their artworks in the museum, such as Damien Hirst and Philippe Pasqua.

== Architecture ==
The style of the museum utilizes Baroque Revival architecture. The façade of the building faces the sea, towering over the sheer cliff face to a height of 279 feet (85.04 m). It took eleven years to build, using 100,000 tons of stone from La Turbie. During construction, the names of twenty well-known oceanographic research vessels personally selected by Prince Albert I were inscribed into the frieze of the museum's façade.

=== Oceanographic research vessels inscribed on façade ===
Country	Vessel	Image	Year Launched	Expedition	Inscription
German Empire	SMS Gazelle		1859	1874–76	GAZELLE
United Kingdom	HMS Investigator		1801	1801–03	INVESTIGATOR
Austrian Empire	SMS Novara		1850	Novara Expedition (1857–59)	NOVARA
Russian Empire	Vitiaz		1862	1870–74 1883–85	VITIAZ
Belgium	RV Belgica		1884	Belgian Antarctic Expedition (1897–99)	BELGICA
France	Talisman			1883	TALISMAN
German Empire	SS Valdivia		1886	Valdivia Expedition (1898–99)	VALDIVIA
Kingdom of Italy	Washington			1881	WASHINGTON
Sweden (United Kingdoms of Sweden and Norway)	SS Vega		1872	1878–79	VEGA
Norway (United Kingdoms of Sweden and Norway)	Fram		1892	Nansen's Fram expedition (1893–96) Sverdrup's Canadian Arctic islands expedition (1898–1902) Amundsen's South Pole expedition (1910–12)	FRAM
Monaco	Princess Alice				PRINCESS ALICE
Monaco	Hirondelle				HIRONDELLE
Austria-Hungary	SMS Pola			Austro-Hungarian Deep Sea Expeditions (1890–93)	POLA
United States	USC&GS George S. Blake		1874	1874–1904	BLAKE
United Kingdom	HMS Challenger		1858	Challenger expedition (1872–76)	CHALLENGER
Netherlands	HNLMS Siboga			Siboga expedition (1899–1900)	SIBOGA
United Kingdom	Buccaneer				BUCCANEER
Kingdom of Portugal	SS Amélia I, II, III, IV			1896, 1897, 1899, 1901–1910	AMELIA
Denmark	Ingolf			1895–96	INGOLF
United States	USS Albatross		1882	1883–97, 1899–1916, 1919–21	ALBATROSS

== Caulerpa taxifolia ==
In 1989, a French marine biologist discovered a patch of a giant, tropical seaweed Caulerpa taxifolia directly under the walls of the museum. The actual source and extent of this exotic introduction remain a matter of controversy.

== Gallery ==
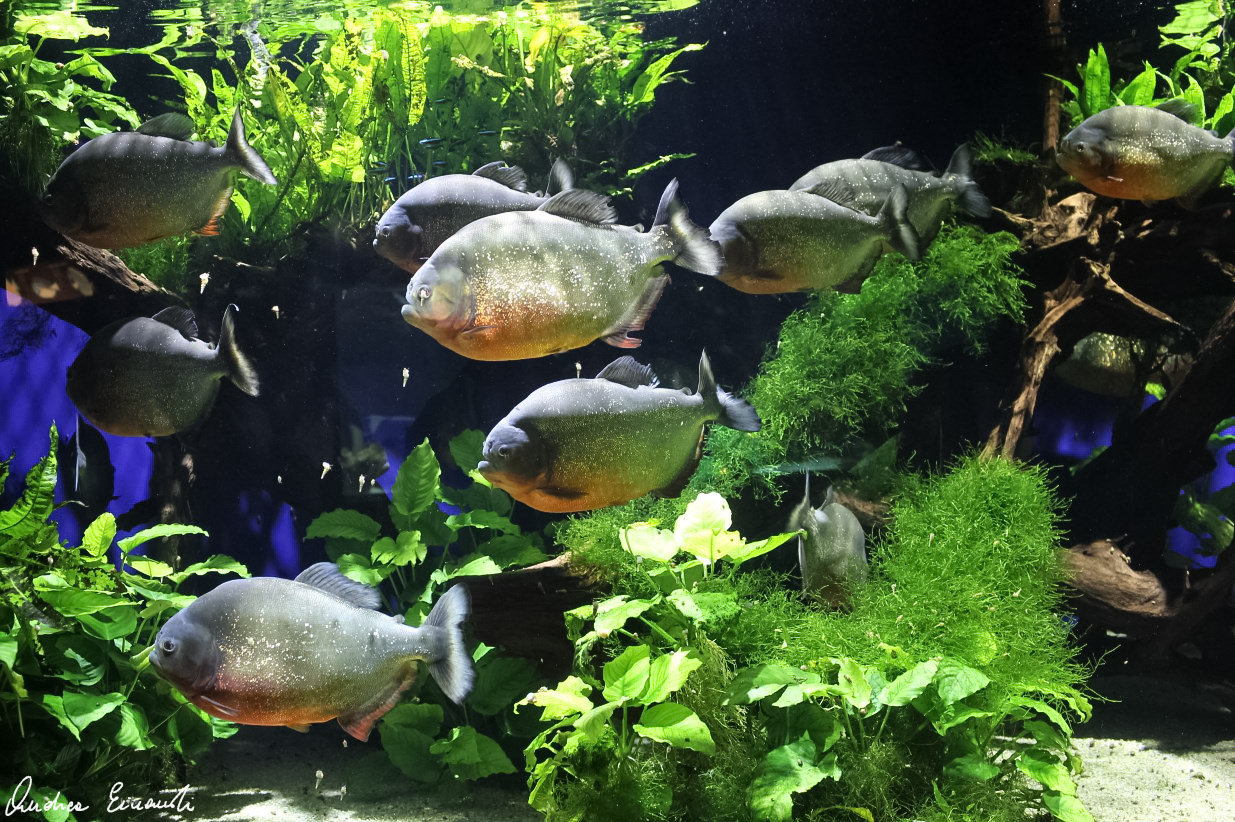
Aquarium with Piranhas

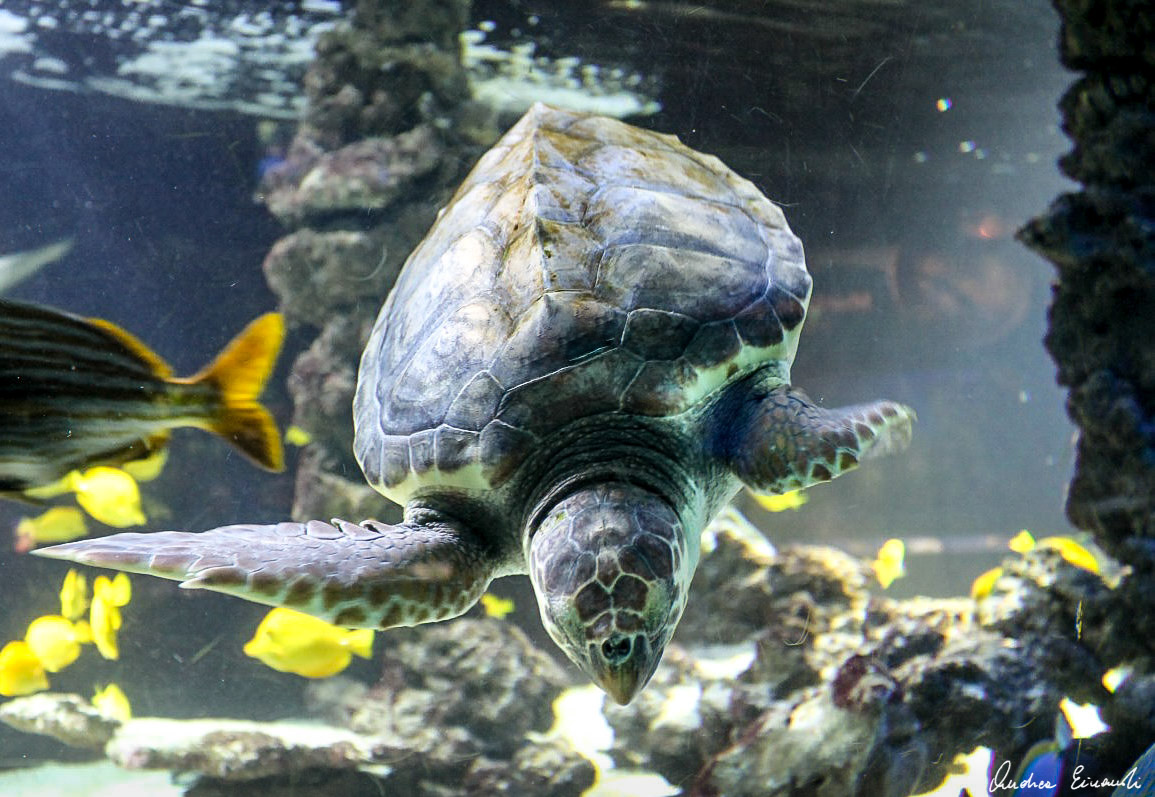
Sea turtle

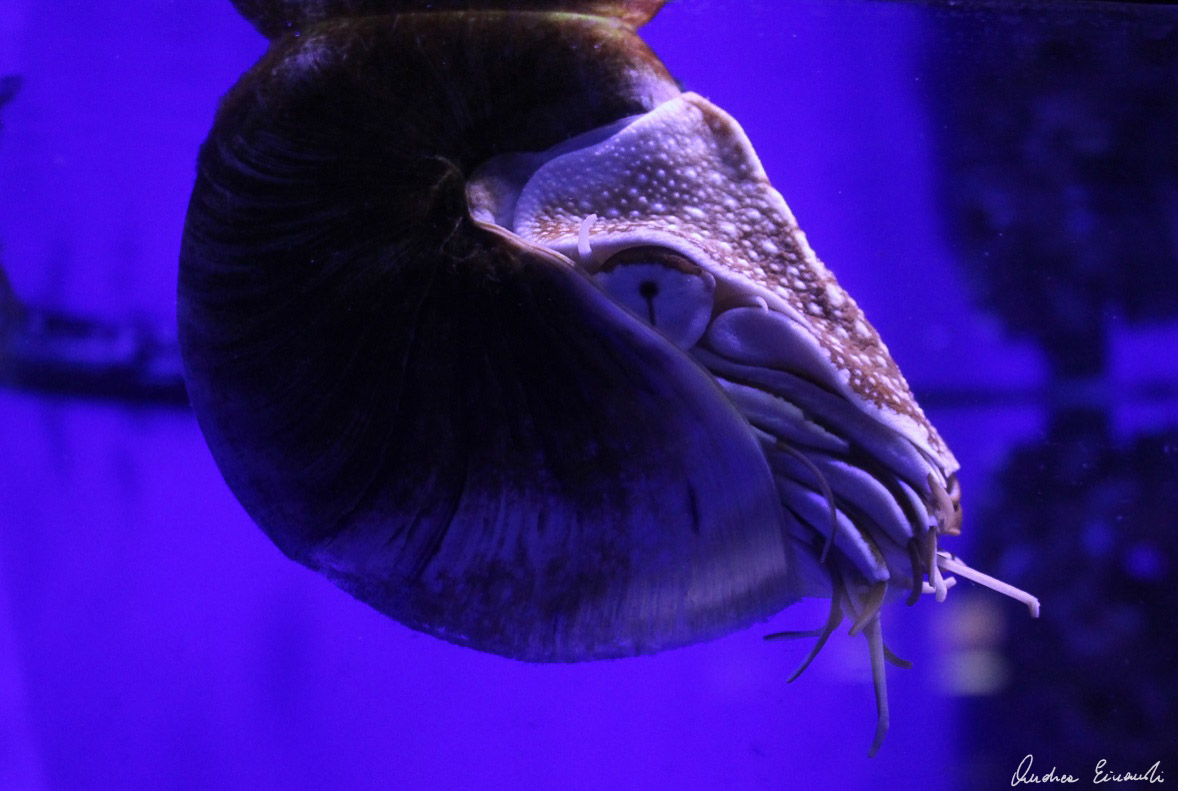
Nautilus

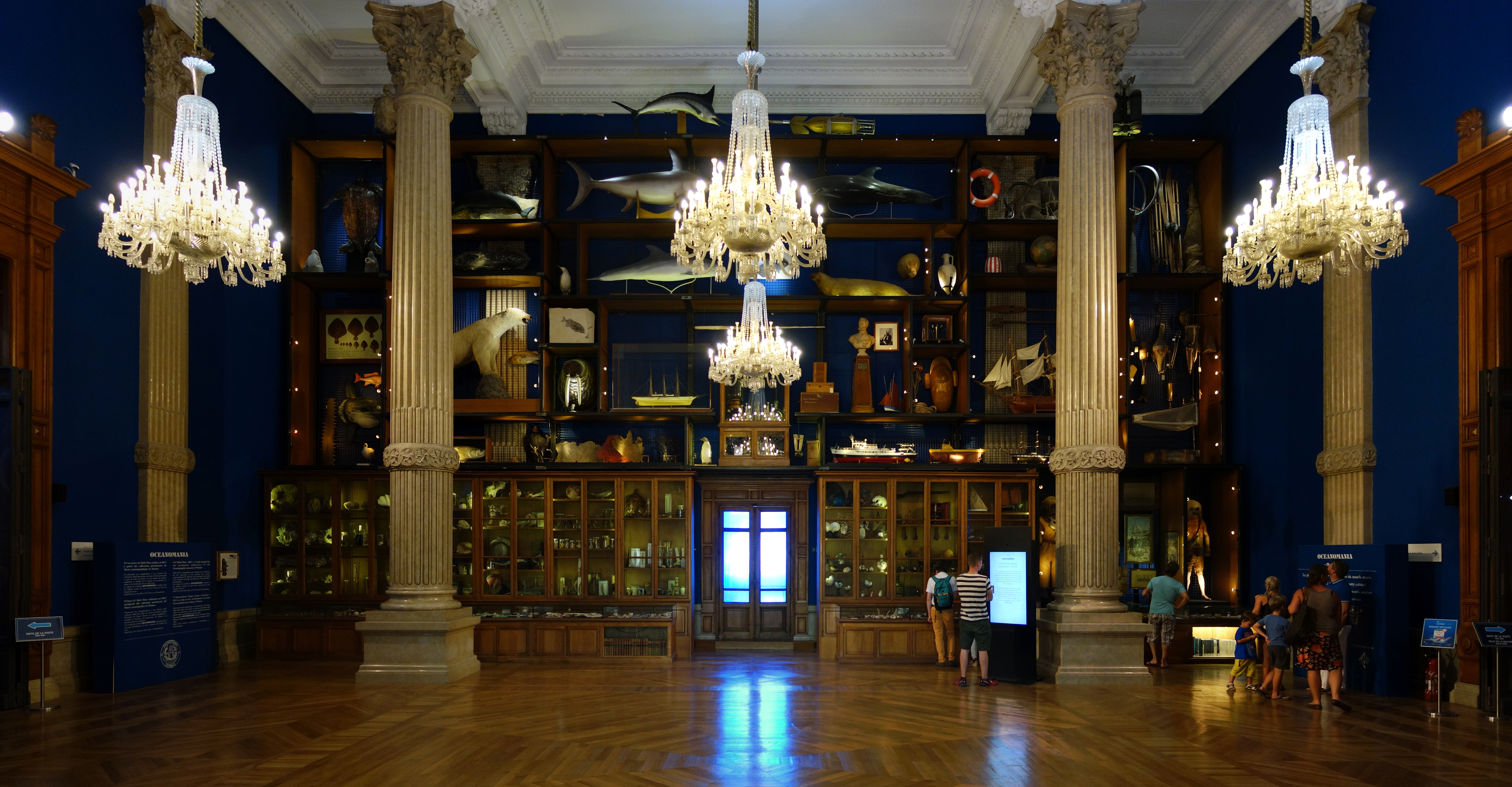
Central room of the top floor

== See also ==
- List of museums in Monaco
