= Swiss Cetacean Society =

Organization

- Formation: 1997
- Founder: Max-Olivier Bourcoud
- Type: NGO, charitable organization
- Purpose: Marine conservation, environmentalism
- Headquarters: Lausanne, Vaud, Switzerland
- Official language: French
- Website: swisscetaceansociety.org

The Swiss Cetacean Society or Swiss Society for the Study and Protection of Cetaceans is a Swiss nonprofit organization dedicated to the conservation of marine mammals and other endangered marine species in their natural habitat. Founded in 1997, its headquarters are in Lausanne in Switzerland.

== History ==
The SCS was founded in 1997 by Max-Olivier Bourcoud, initially under the name Swiss Association for the Protection of Marine Mammals (ASMS in French). In 2001, it adopted the name Swiss Cetacean Society (SCS).

It is a member of the International Union for Conservation of Nature (IUCN), an official partner of ACCOBAMS (Agreement on the Conservation of Cetaceans of the Black Sea, Mediterranean Sea, and Contiguous Atlantic Area), Tethys Research Institute, the World Cetacean Alliance (WCA), and Longitude 181 Nature.

In 2005, it was designated as an Earth Champion by the Earth Champions Foundation.

As of 2023, it has over 1’400 members and is one of the primary data providers on cetaceans in the northwestern Mediterranean.

== Objective ==
The SCS is a nonprofit environmental organization with a public interest mission dedicated to the conservation of marine mammals. Its main objective is to provide logistical support for scientific research beneficial to marine conservation abroad. In Switzerland, it promotes knowledge of cetaceans to enhance their conservation.

To achieve this goal, the organization has implemented five strategies:

- supporting scientific research in marine conservation
- ensuring logistics at sea for environmental scientific programs
- dissemination of popularized information about marine wildlife
- organization of camps to raise awareness on marine ecology
- facilitating access to specialized training

== Activities ==
=== Abroad ===
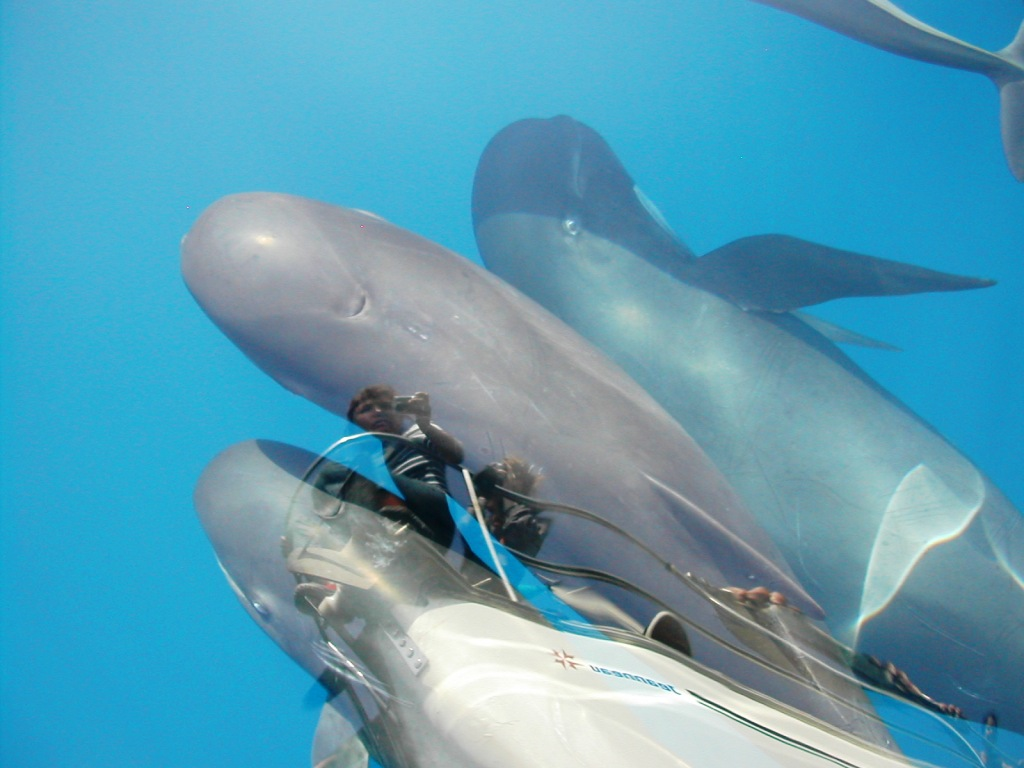
Pilot whales during a scientific expedition

==== Mediterranean program ====
The Swiss Cetacean Society - SCS organizes data acquisition campaigns at sea to study cetacean populations. These scientific programs are co-funded by the Swiss public. The collected data is then transmitted to scientific partners who process and analyze it. This activity involves research platforms and crews composed of eco-volunteers supervised by specialized naturalists during the summer.

From 1997 to 2023, the SCS conducted over 1’600 days of data collection in the Mediterranean Sea, allowing for the identification and observation of tens of thousands of cetaceans belonging to 8 species. In total, more than 1’500 volunteers, spread across more than 300 expeditions, carried out this work at sea, benefiting the International Commission for the Scientific Exploration of the Mediterranean Sea (CIESM). and numerous European research organizations, such as the Association Tursiops in the Balearic Islands and EcoOcéan Institut in the Ligurian Sea. The aim of these various scientific programs is to study the populations of whales and dolphins in the northwestern Mediterranean in the summer to improve their protection.

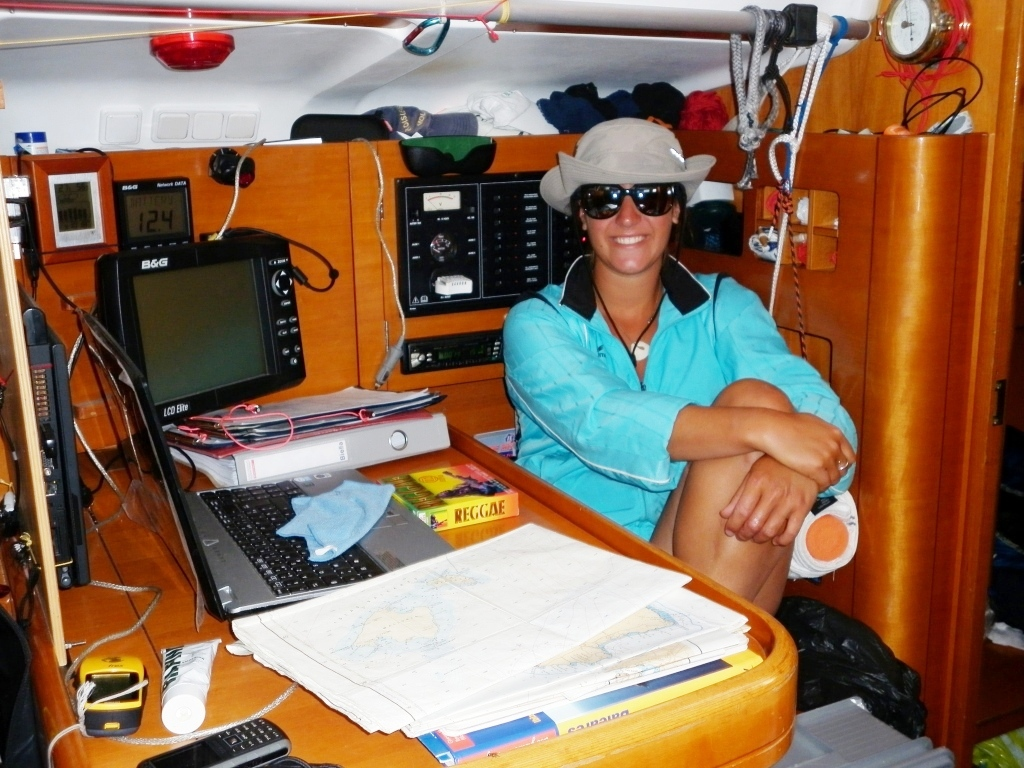
Inside of a scientific expeditions boat and its equipment

Additionally, the SCS participated as a logistical partner of CNRS in a vast international and multidisciplinary program to study the Common Rorqual of the Mediterranean (the second-largest whale in the world), involving numerous researchers from various disciplines (oceanographers, ecologists, geneticists, biochemists, etc.). In this research, the SCS worked closely with the EPFL's Laboratory of Ecotoxicology (Prof. Dr. Ing. J. Tarradellas) for the analysis of micropollutants.

As a result, the SCS has become one of the leading providers of cetological data in the northwestern Mediterranean Sea and a recognized partner of environmental institutions in Monaco (CIESM, ACCOBAMS, RAMOGE).

===== Comoros Islands =====
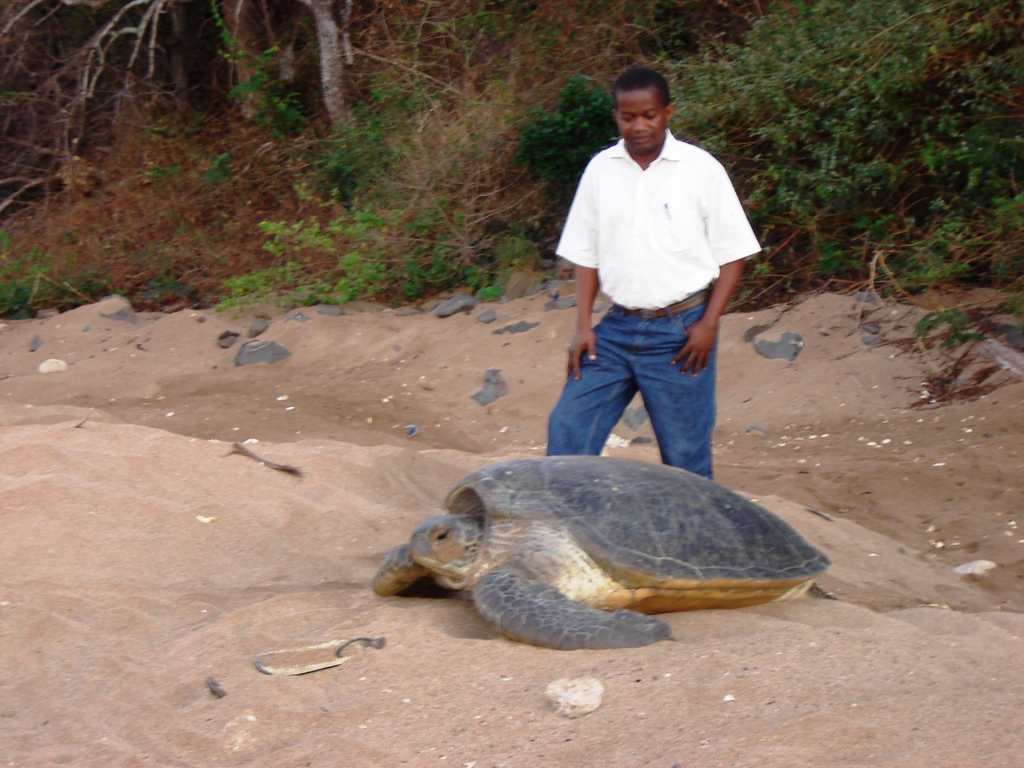
Green turtle and an eco-guards in the Comoro Islands

Since 2010, the SCS has been successfully carrying out a project to protect green turtles in the Indian Ocean in the Comoros (Ulanga Ngazidja), considered by the IUCN. as one of the most endangered turtle species in the world. In order to protect them when they come to the Grande Comore beach to lay their eggs, three strategies have been implemented:

- a campaign to raise awareness about coastal and marine issues (including the endangered green sea turtle) is conducted among villagers, children, and influential individuals
- an information center for eco-tourists and villagers has been established, for which furniture, posters, brochures, and appropriate educational materials have been developed. The center collaborates with local artisans to sell marine-related items. This long-term effort is expected to create an alternative economic income for local communities and gradually steer them away from poaching
- a coastal patrol has been established, composed and managed by eco-guards who have been trained in monitoring nesting sites to combat poaching and collecting scientific data on turtle activities

===== Mexico =====
In partnership with ProNatura Noroeste in Mexico, the SCS has been contributing since 2014 to slowing down the extinction of the California porpoise (Phocoena sinus) or Vaquita, which is endemic to that region. To achieve this, it has played a role in the development of new fishing alternatives known as "Vaquitas friendly." These new techniques have prevented Vaquitas, as well as other larger marine species such as turtles, from getting entangled and potentially suffocating in fishing nets. Additionally, the SCS has assisted in conducting monitoring expeditions of the remaining Vaquitas, whose population appears to have stabilized (around a dozen).

===== Indonesia =====
Since early 2023, the SCS has been involved in the conservation of green turtles in Bali by collaborating with JAAN (Jakarta Animal Aid Network), a local NGO. It assists local stakeholders in caring for turtles confiscated from poachers, thanks to the new veterinary center it has funded, by examining, treating, and releasing them into the ocean once their health has stabilized.

Furthermore, the SCS has committed to supporting a program aimed at replanting mangroves in areas where they are at risk of disappearing.

===== Other =====
Additionally, the SCS has also:

- participated in a research program associated with the Dolphin Communication Project, focusing on interactions between Atlantic spotted dolphins (Stenella frontalis) and bottlenose dolphins (Tursiops truncatus) in the "Bahamas".
- contributed to research on Risso's dolphins (Grampus griseus) in the "Azores", led by Dr. José Azevedo at the Risso's Dolphin Research Center.
- supported the implementation of a research program on gray whales in the Canadian Pacific, led by Dr. David Duffus at the University of Victoria-Vancouver.
- established an eco-certification program for whale and dolphin watching in India (Goa) in collaboration with Terra Conscious.
- contributed to the conservation efforts for the critically endangered Mediterranean monk seals (Monachus monachus) in Greece and Mauritania.

=== In Switzerland ===
In Switzerland, the SCS aims to promote a better understanding of cetaceans and their environment, as well as to raise public awareness about the fragility of the marine ecosystem.

The educational component plays a significant role in the local activities of the Swiss Cetacean Society.

==== Conferences and Educational Activities ====
Throughout the year, the SCS organizes numerous conferences for the general public, participates in radio and television programs, and presents its perspective in various museums and exhibitions.

==== SCS Forums ====
Periodically, the SCS hosts a conference known as a Forum, each with a predetermined theme. To date, themes have included topics such as the evolutionary process of the sperm whale, the dangers of plastic waste in the oceans, seal protection, the fragility of coral reefs, and dolphin hunting, among others.

==== SCS Training Programs ====
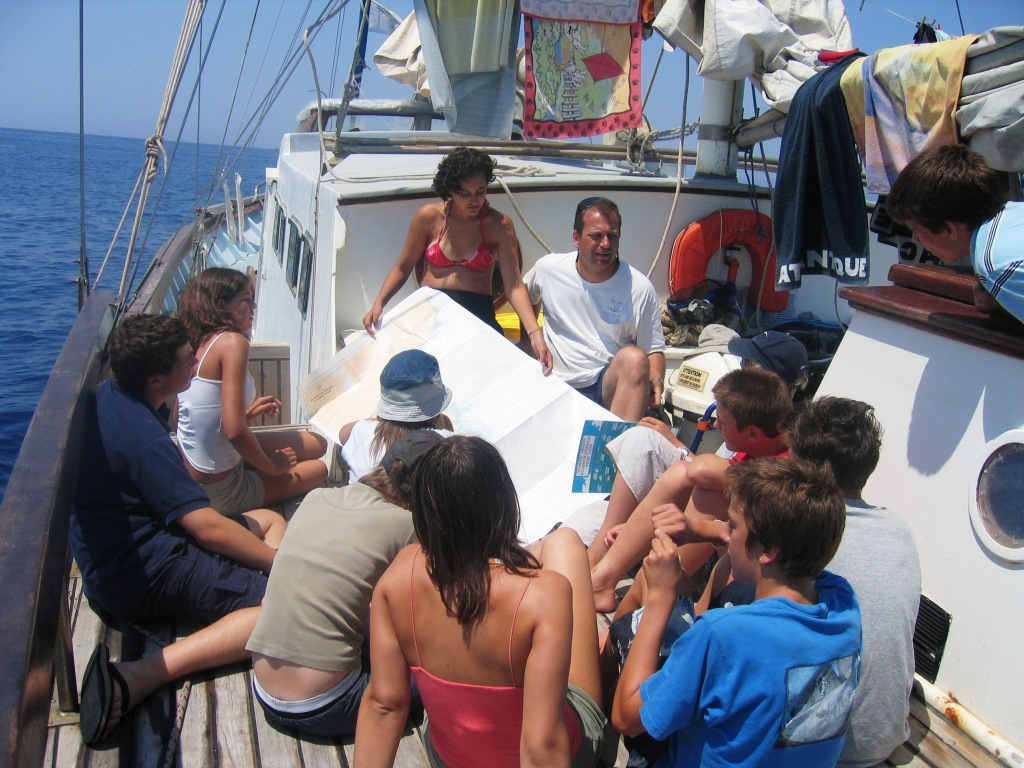
SCS "Atelier Mer"

In collaboration with marine biologists, the SCS offers training in general cetology. Subjects covered include whale and dolphin species, their ecology, the impacts of human activities on cetaceans, and methods of studying them at sea.

Upon request from concerned institutions, the SCS organizes sea awareness camps focusing on marine ecology. "Sea Workshops" are designed for young individuals aged 12 to 16 from specialized institutions in French-speaking Switzerland. This experience allows them to:

- discover guided snorkeling
- sail on a sailboat close to the Mediterranean Sea fauna and flora
- gain a better understanding of marine animals (biology, characteristics, needs)
- analyze the impacts of pollution and human activities on cetaceans and their habitat
- visualize the functioning of a coastal ecosystem to promote marine environmental respect
- implement daily practices that are environmentally friendly at home and elsewhere

Today, in Switzerland, the SCS stands as one of the primary sources of information on cetaceans, serving as a specialized information center for the public, students, travelers, and the media. The SCS is committed to a rigorous information policy to help the public understand the significant issues surrounding marine environmental conservation.

== Timeline and Major Achievements of the SCS ==
2002:

- SCS is granted the status of Official Partner of the ACCOBAMS (Agreement on the Conservation of Cetaceans in the Black Sea, Mediterranean Sea, and Contiguous Atlantic Area) intergovernmental agreement
- creation of the ACCOBAMS training kit, an educational tool used by those organizing research projects for the conservation of Mediterranean cetaceans (ACCOBAMS mandate 2002)
- initiation of the monitoring program in the Pelagos Marine Sanctuary

2005:

- designated as an Earth Champion by the Earth Champions Foundation

2007:

- publication of a book on cetaceans titled "Les Cétacés en Questions" (Cetaceans in Question by M. Rod and SCS)

2010:

- launch of the Green Turtle Protection program in Comoros at Ndroudé

2011:

- collection and submission of 15’000 signatures demanding an end to Switzerland's support for commercial whaling within the International Whaling Commission (IWC)

2012:

- contribution to the closing of Switzerland's only dolphinarium with the assistance of Isabelle Chevalley, Swiss National Council member
- initiation of the Mediterranean Monk Seal Conservation program

2014:

- SCS becomes a member of the IUCN (International Union for Conservation of Nature)
- agreement with the IOC (International Olympic Committee) to ensure that no captive dolphins are used during the Sochi Winter Olympics and distribution of special nets to local fishermen in Mexico to help slow the extinction of the California porpoise

2018:

- participation in the creation of the Balearic Islands Marine Sanctuary

2019:

- SCS becomes a member of the World Cetacean Alliance (WCA)
- initiation of three coastal conservation projects in Goa, India, in collaboration with the local NGO Terra Conscious

2023:

- establishment of a veterinary care center for poached marine turtles in Bali

From 1997 to 2023, the SCS has also achieved the following :
- more than 300 scientific data collection expeditions at sea in various locations, including the French Riviera, the Balearic Islands, the Azores, the Bahamas, and Vancouver
- over 1’600 days of work at sea to help the scientific community for the study of cetaceans and pollution factors
- more than 1’500 eco-volunteers at sea
- nearly 400 young participants in the SCS's Sea Workshops
- nearly 300 media appearances in French-speaking Switzerland, including press, radio, and television
- organization of over 200 free public conferences and Forums on marine-related topics
- organization of more than 70 courses in cetology and marine biology
- organization of over 50 information and awareness booths for the general public
