= Car Collection of Rainier III, Prince of Monaco =

Car museum in La Condamine, Monaco

Coordinates: 43.7354011°N 7.4218114°E

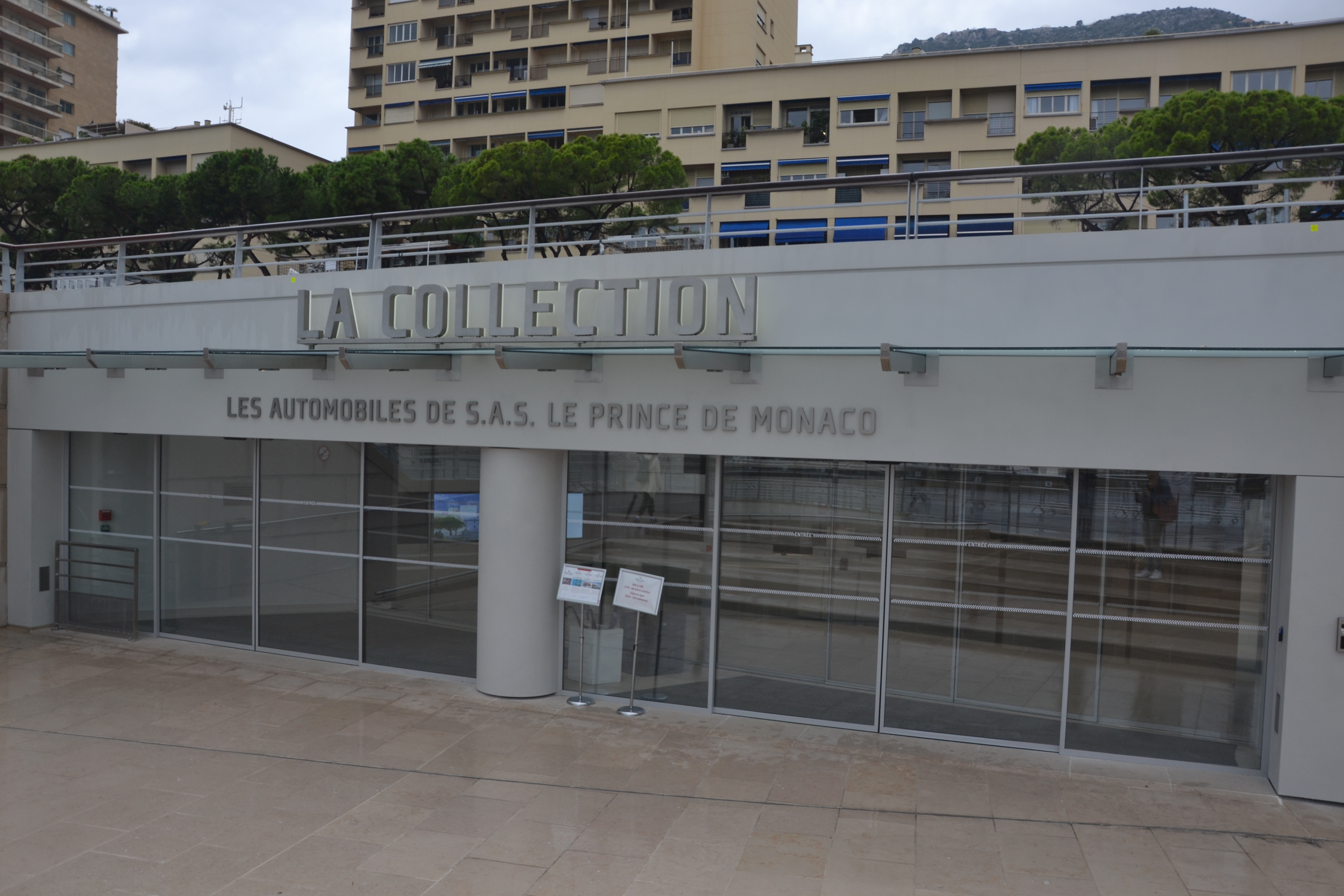
Entrance to the automobile museum in Monaco

The Exhibition of HSH The Prince of Monaco's Car Collection is an automobile museum in the La Condamine district of Monaco. The museum exhibits the personal car collection of Prince Rainier III of Monaco, which he assembled of a period of thirty years.

== The collection ==
The cars were the personal collection of Prince Rainier III of Monaco (1923–2005), and assembled over a thirty-year period. The collection contains almost one hundred classic cars made in Europe and the United States. Notable cars in the collection include the Bugatti Type 35 driven by William Grover-Williams that won the inaugural Monaco Grand Prix in 1929, and Sébastien Loeb's Citroën DS3 WRC, which he drove to victory in the 2013 Monte Carlo Rally. 38 cars from the collection were put up for auction in 2012 due to Prince Albert II's desire to re-organise and expand the collection.

The cars are displayed over five levels in a specially constructed space in the Terrasses de Fontvieille, and the museum is open daily from 10am to 6pm, excluding Christmas Day and New Year's Day.

The museum also displays cars that have been donated or lent. One such car is a Ferrari SF90 that was driven by Charles Leclerc in the 2019 Formula One World Championship.

== History ==
Prince Rainier III opened his collection up to the public in 1993, after his collection became too large to keep at the palace garage. The collection was originally kept at the Terrasses de Fontvielle, but was moved to a new building at Port Hercules, in the middle of the Grand Prix Circut, in 2022.

== Gallery ==
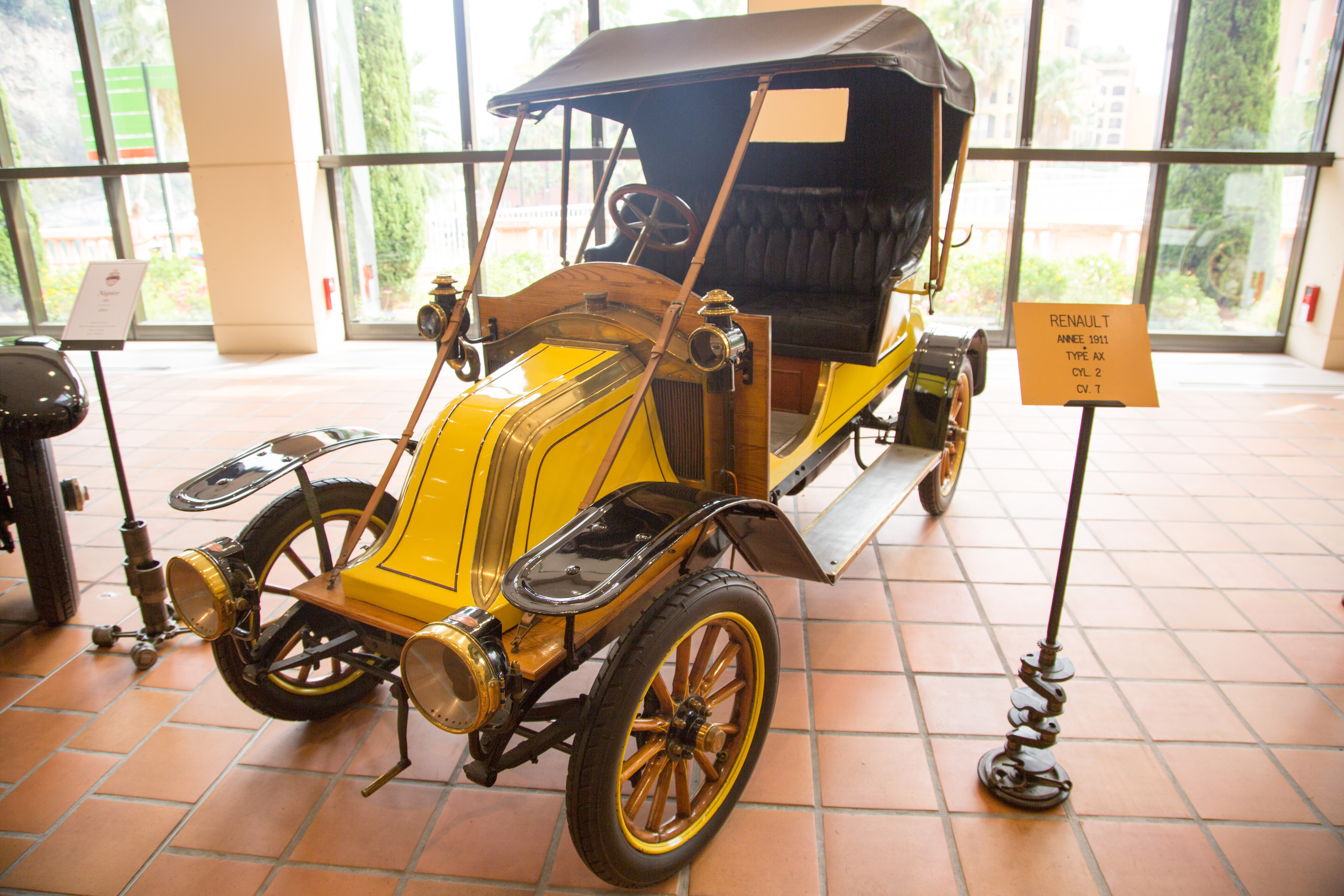

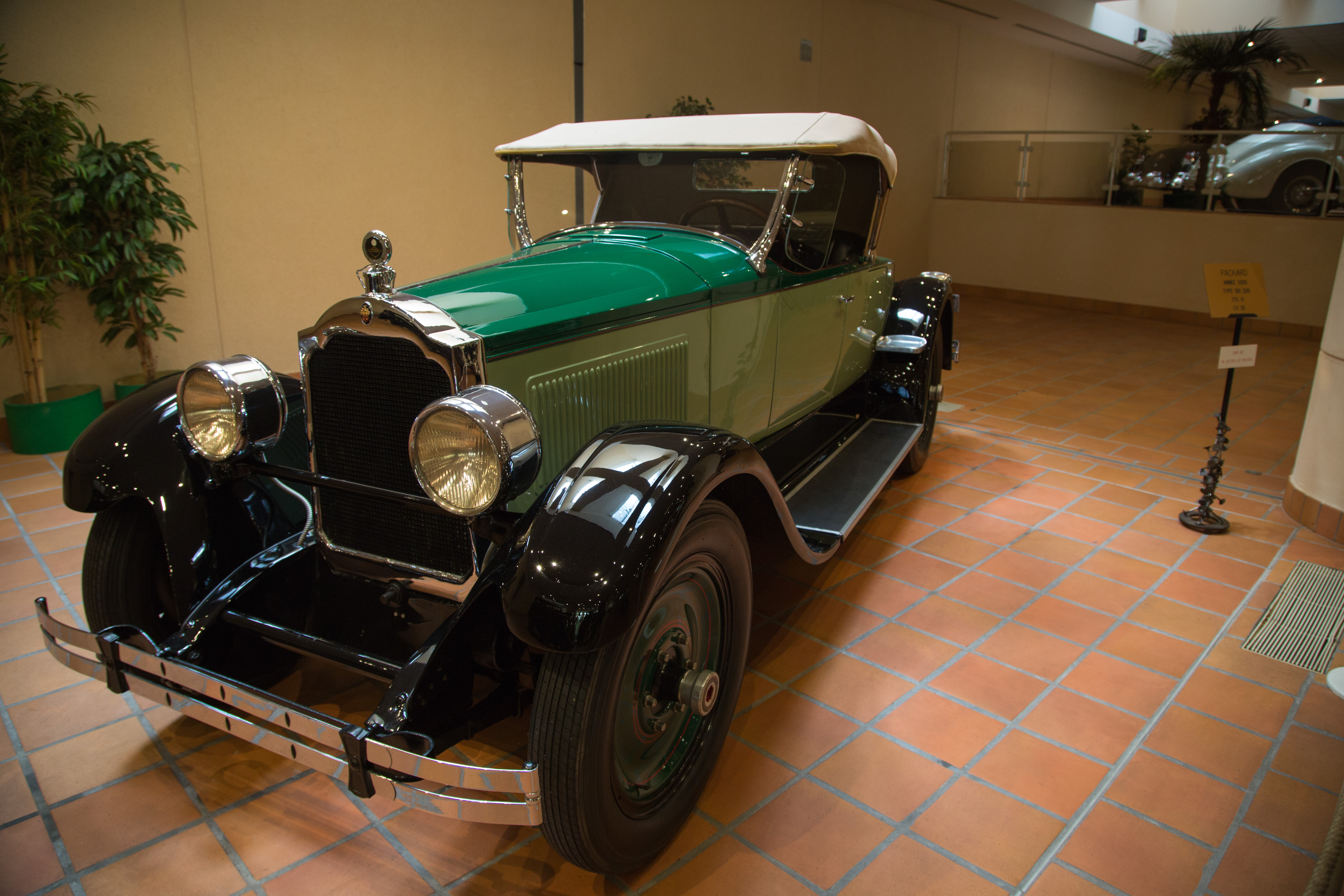

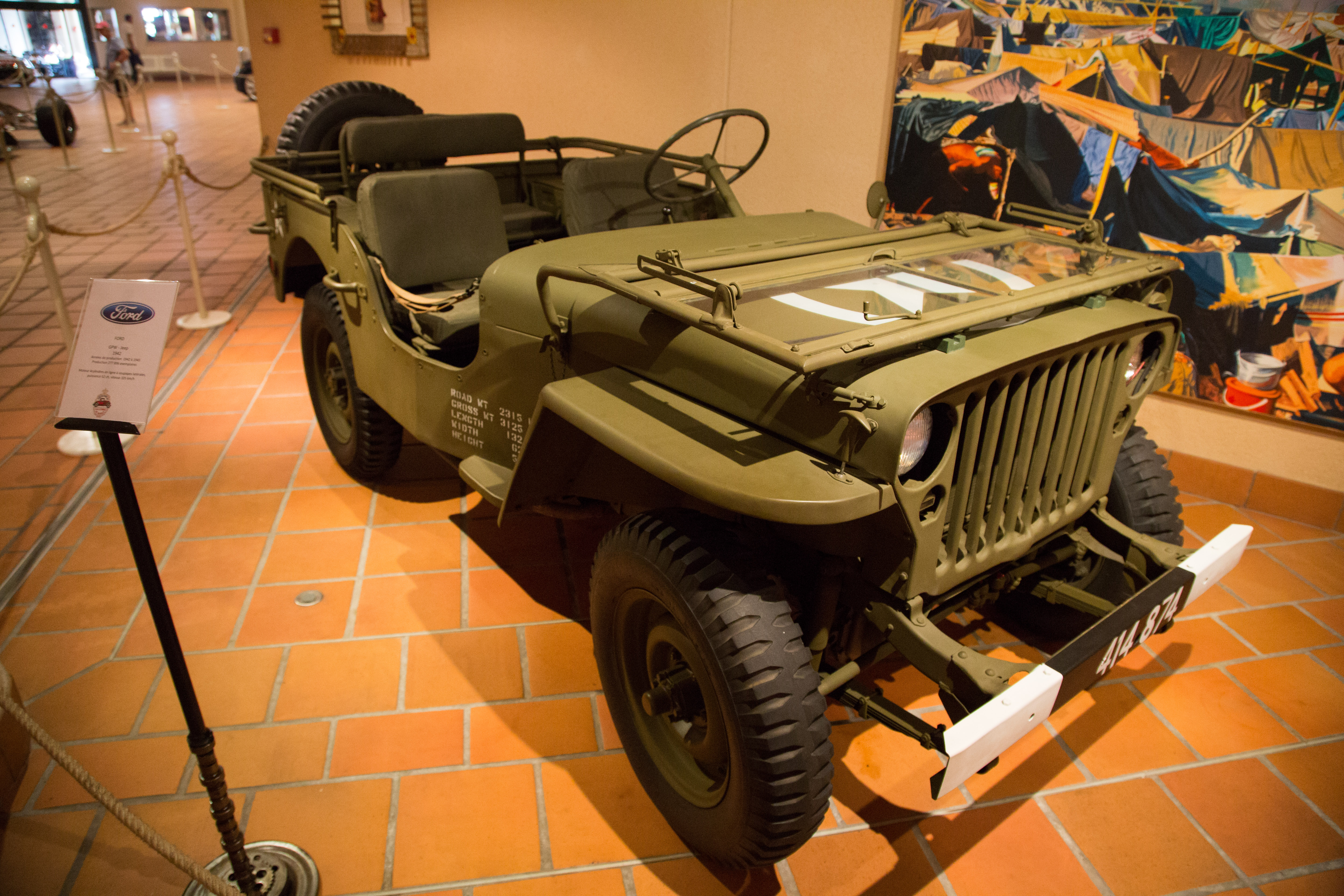

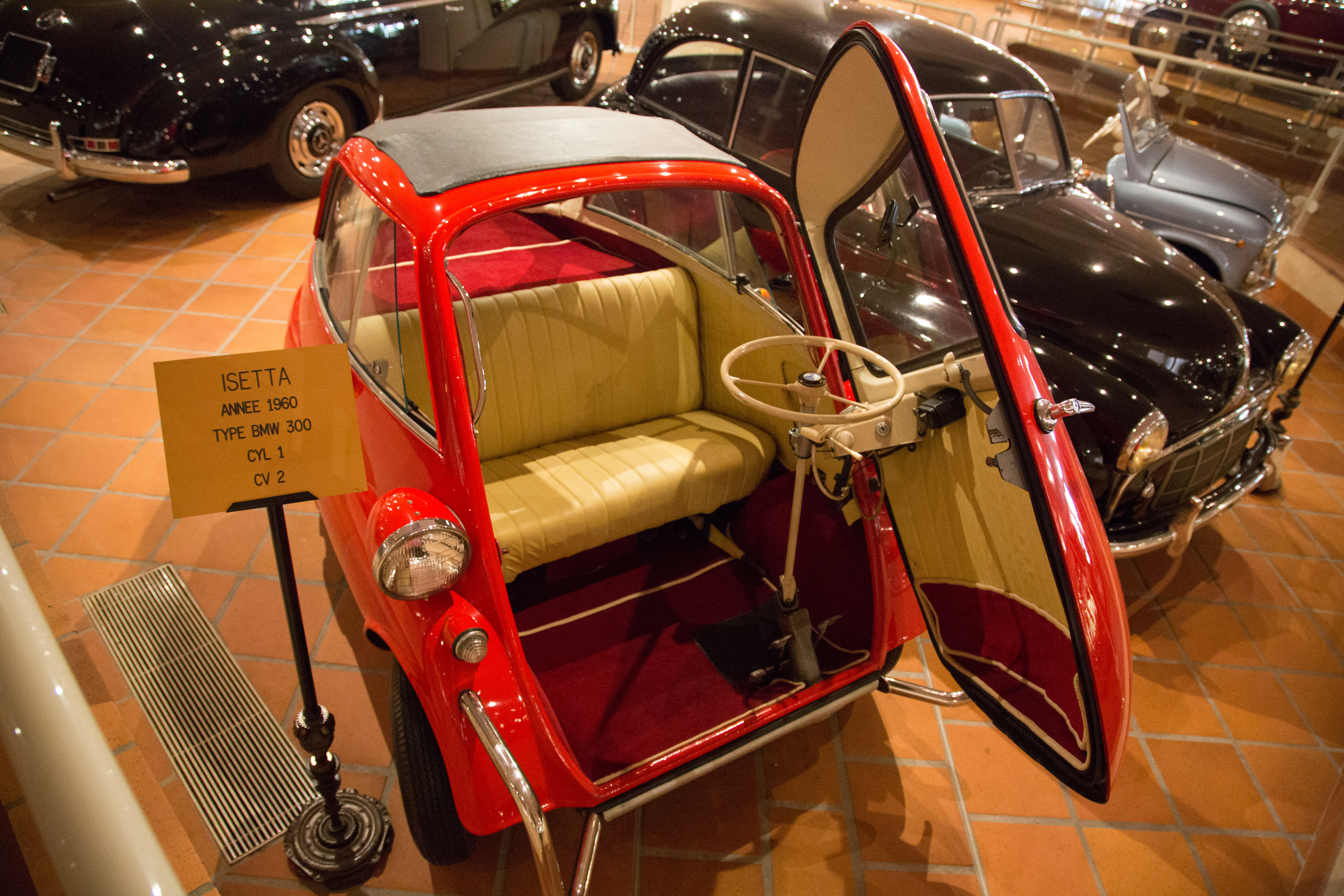

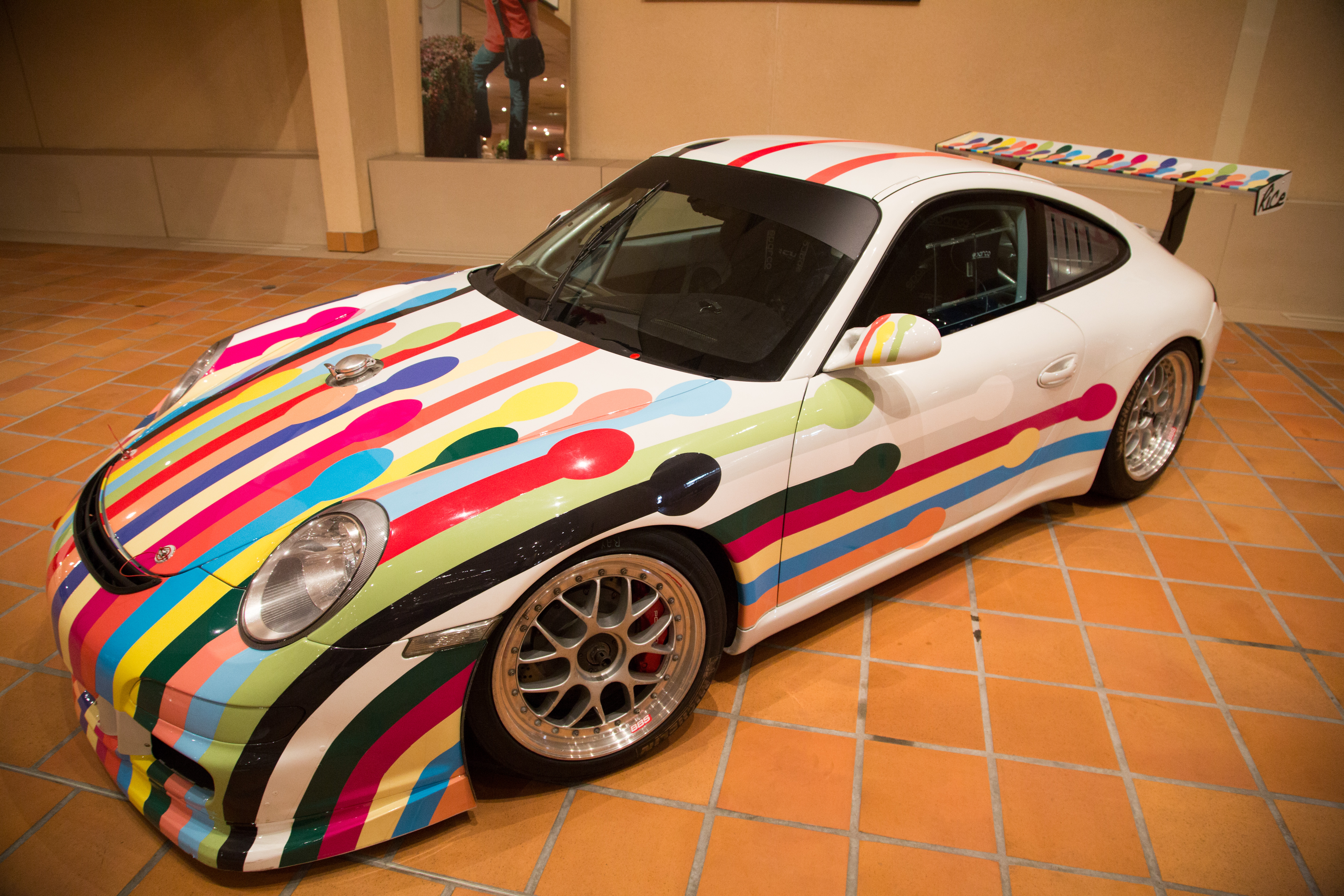

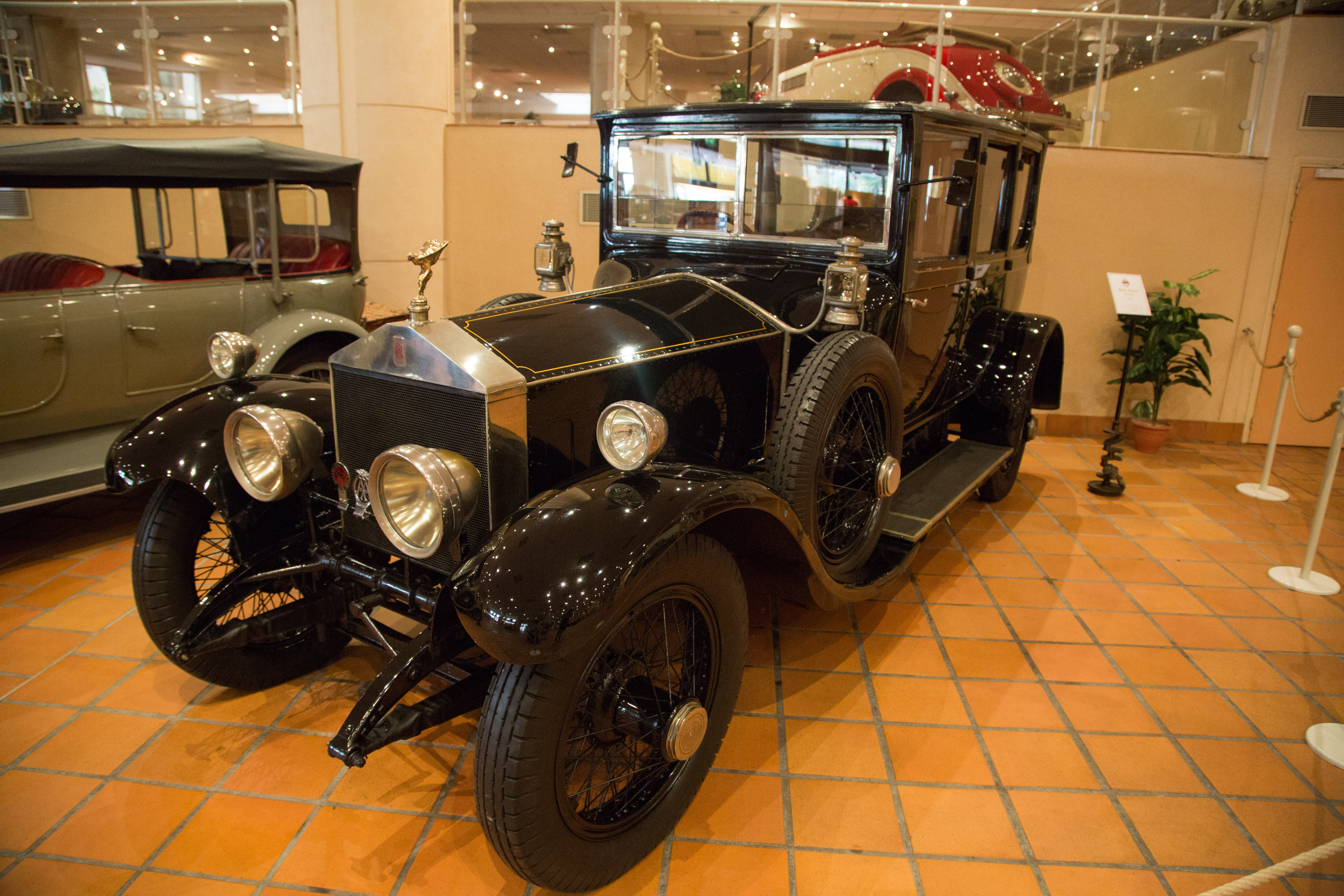

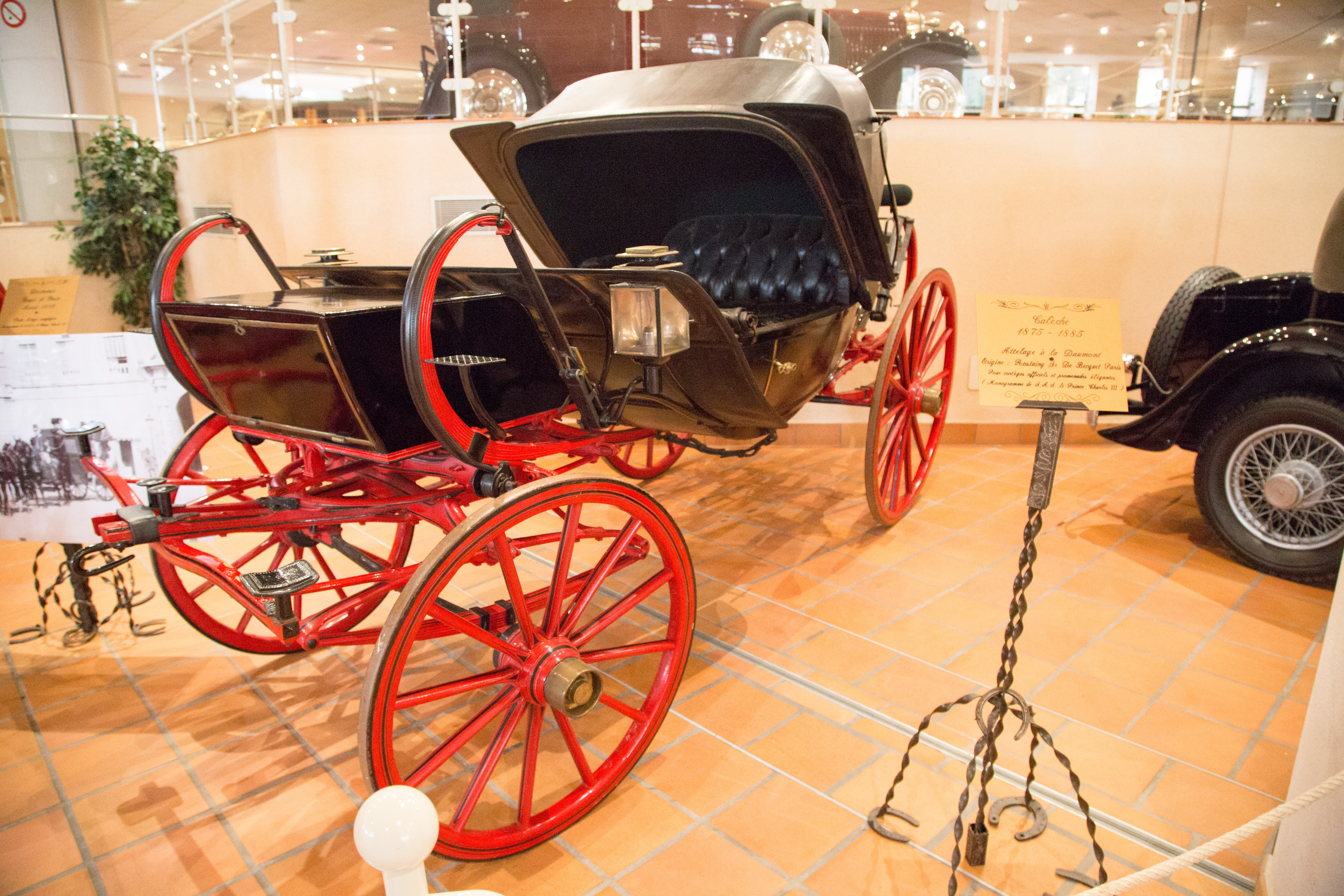

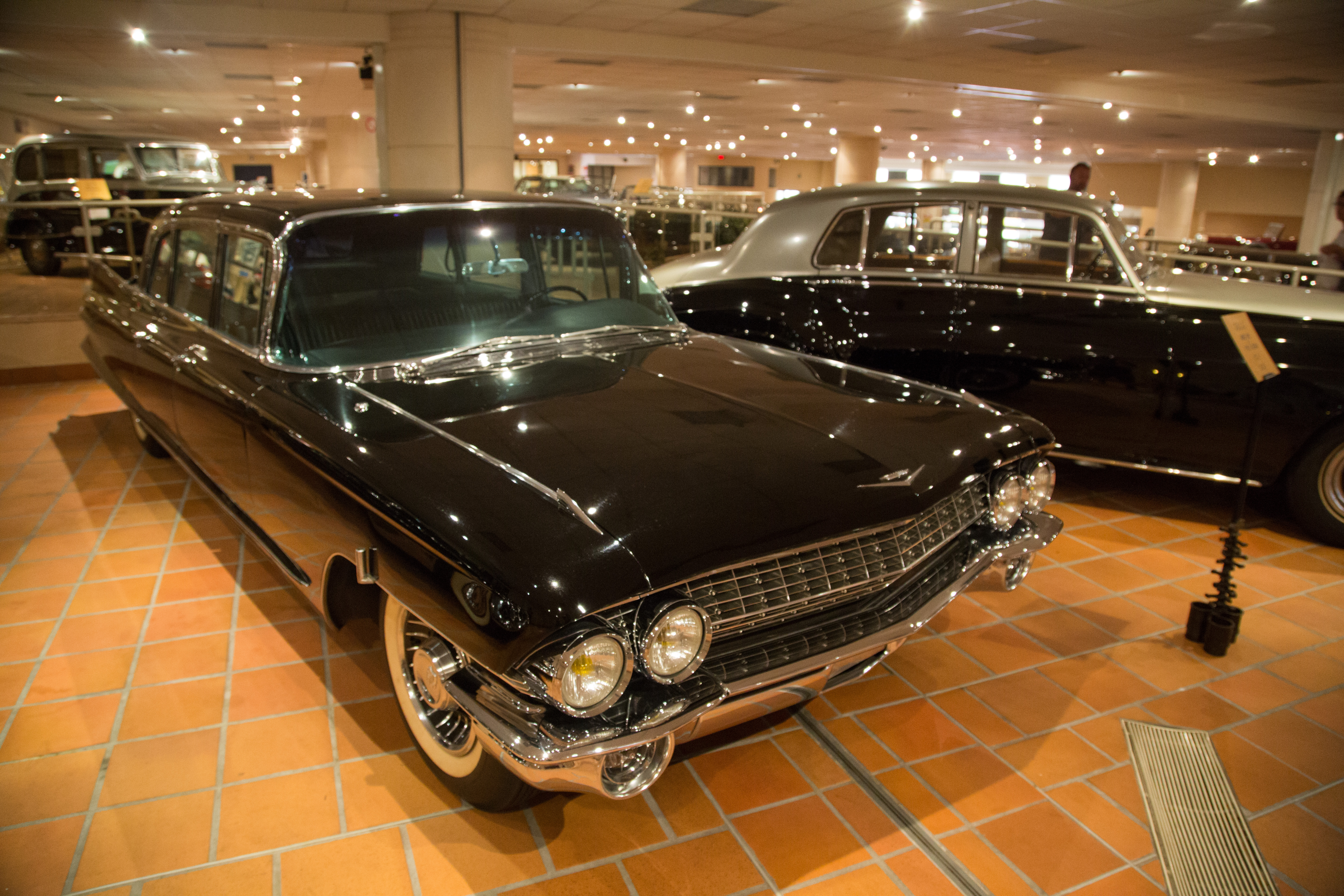

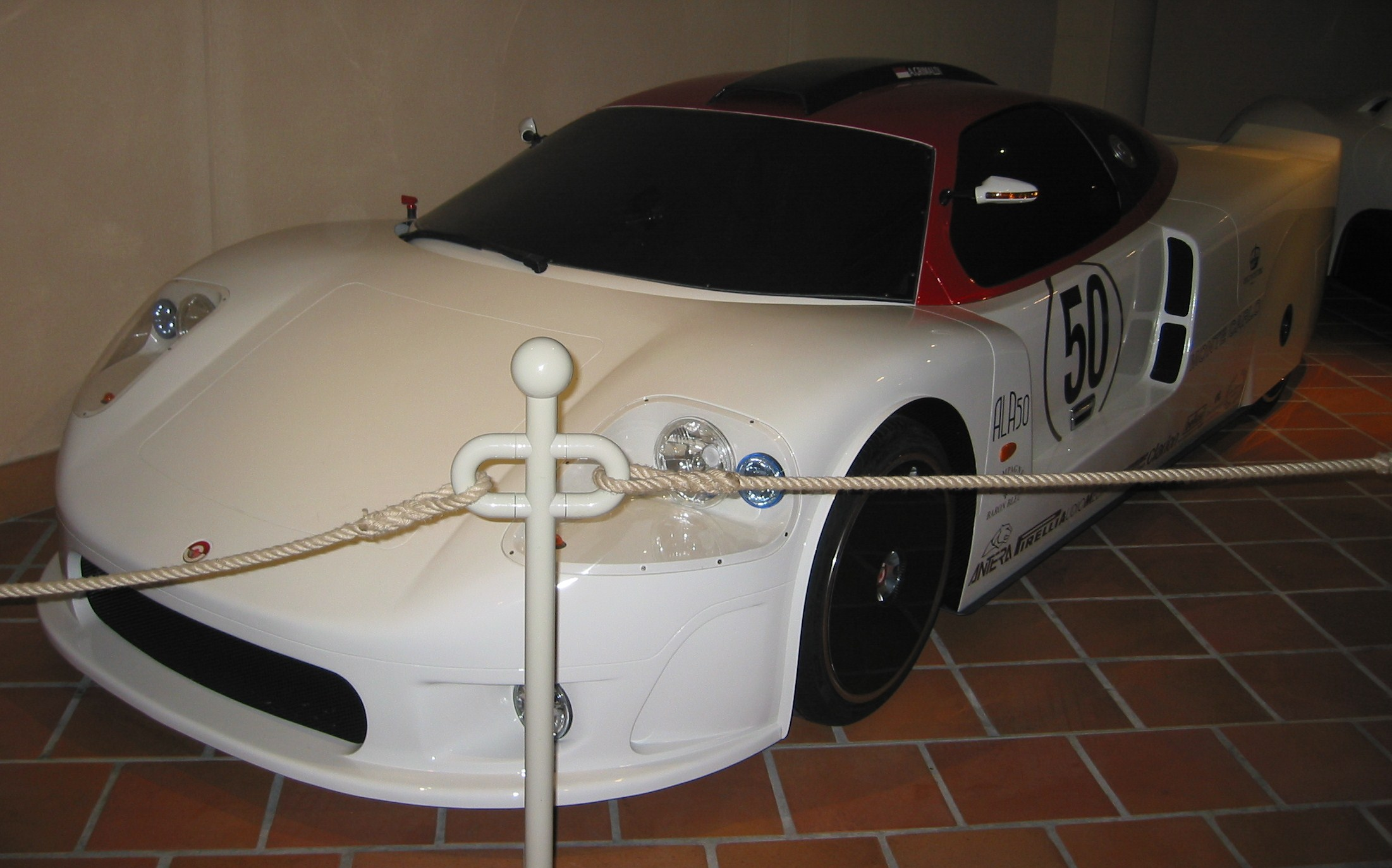

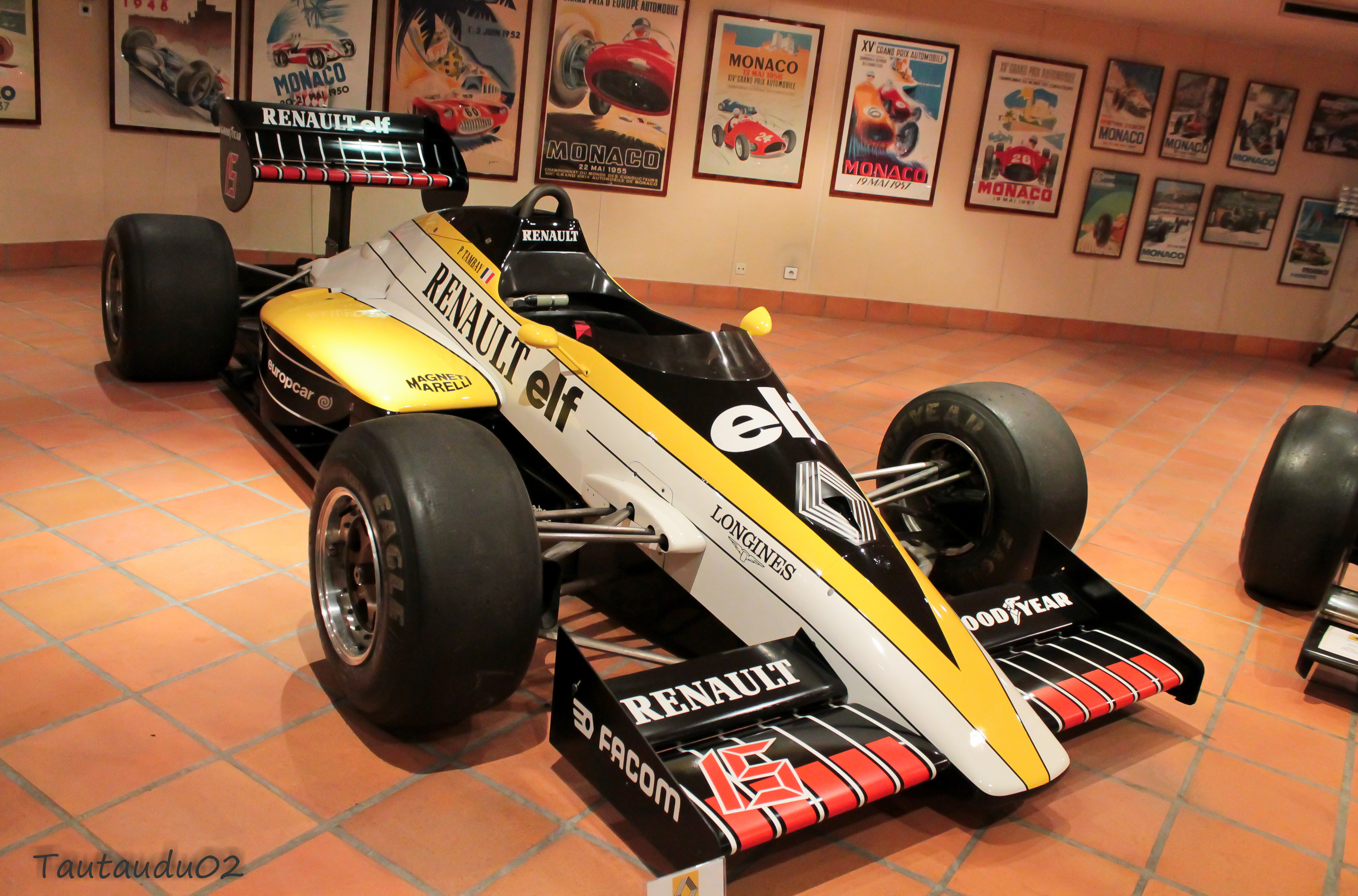

== See also ==
- List of museums in Monaco
