= Jose Mugrabi =

Israeli businessman and art collector of Syrian descent

- יוסף מוגרבי
- Born: 1939 (age 86–87); Jerusalem, Mandatory Palestine
- Occupations: Industrialist and art collector
- Known for: Owner of 800 Andy Warhol artworks
- Spouse: Mary
- Children: 2 sons

Jose Mugrabi (Hebrew: יוסף מוגרבי; born 1939) is an Israeli businessman and art collector. With a family net worth estimated at $5 billion, he is the leading collector of Andy Warhol, with 800 artworks.

== Biography ==
Yosef "Jose" Mugrabi was born to a Syrian-Jewish family in Jerusalem. He grew up in the Mahane Yehuda neighborhood. His family managed a grocery store in Nahalat Ahim. They have two sons, Alberto "Tico" Mugrabi and David Mugrabi.

In September 2016, Alberto married Colby Jordan, daughter of investor Jay W. Jordan II, at the Hôtel du Cap-Eden-Roc in Antibes, France.

Mugrabi lives with his wife Mary in Trump Tower in New York City. His three sisters live in Israel.

== Business career ==
At the age of 16, Mugrabi went to Colombia to stay with relatives, and became involved in the textile business. Starting as an errand boy, he became one of the country's major importers. In 1982, he moved to New York, where he met art dealer Jeffrey Deitch and began collecting art.

== Art collection ==
Mugrabi owned the world's largest collection of paintings by Andy Warhol, which are now owned by his sons. His art collection included works by Renoir, Picasso, Rodin, Ernst, Daumier, Damien Hirst, Jeff Koons, and Jean-Michel Basquiat in addition to 800 Warhols. He also owned the largest collection of Philippe Pasqua's paintings. The Mugrabi art is stored in Zurich and near Newark, New Jersey.

Mugrabi's first purchase was a Renoir landscape, bought in 1982 for $121,000 on the advice of Deitch. The Mugrabis say they base their collecting model on Charles Saatchi, although he purchased multiple works of many artists and the Mugrabis collect only a preferred few.

In 2008, the Wall Street Journal reported on how the Mugrabis were said by several art dealers to be "doing whatever they can to keep Warhol prices high, including occasionally overpaying – or overcharging – for the artworks."

In November 1988, at Sotheby's in New York, Mugrabi set a new world record for Warhol's work when he purchased Marilyn Monroe (Twenty Times) for $3.96 million. In 2008, he bought Warhol's Detail of the Last Supper (Christ 112 Times) (1986) for $9.5 million. He purchased Warhol’s Men in Her Life (1962), a painting based on an image of a young Elizabeth Taylor between husbands, for $63.3 million in 2010, the second-highest price paid for a Warhol at the time. At a 2012 Sotheby's auction, he acquired Warhol's Double Elvis (Ferus Type) (1963) for $33 million.

At a Christie's auction in 2013, he sold Coca-Cola (3) (1962) to Alice L. Walton for $57.2 million.

In 2013, Mugrabi set a record for the most expensive work by a living artist, when he paid $58.4 million for Jeff Koons’s Balloon Dog (Orange) from Peter M. Brant's collection at Christie's.

In February 2020, he lent items from his Koons collection to the Tel Aviv Museum of Art for the "Absolute Value" exhibition, which ran to October 2020.

== Losing to Madoff ==
The Mugrabis, who live in New York, were investors in a Bernard Madoff fund and lost money as a result.

The fund was backed by loans from banks including Banco Bilbao Vizcaya Argentaria and Nomura Holdings, which invested about $304 million."We had very little money with the fund – just under a million dollars – so I am not that upset personally," said Mugrabi's son Albert. "It was a very informal thing. We know Andrés (Piedrahita) since forever, from Bogotá, he’s a great guy, and he says to us, ‘This is the Madoff thing, he’s the master.’ I trusted Andrés. I still trust him."

== Family ==
Jose's son David Mugrabi is set to inherit many of his father's art pieces, from Warhol to Basquiat. In 2018 David divorced socialite Libbie Mugrabi.
