= Philippe Pasqua =

French contemporary artist (born 1965)

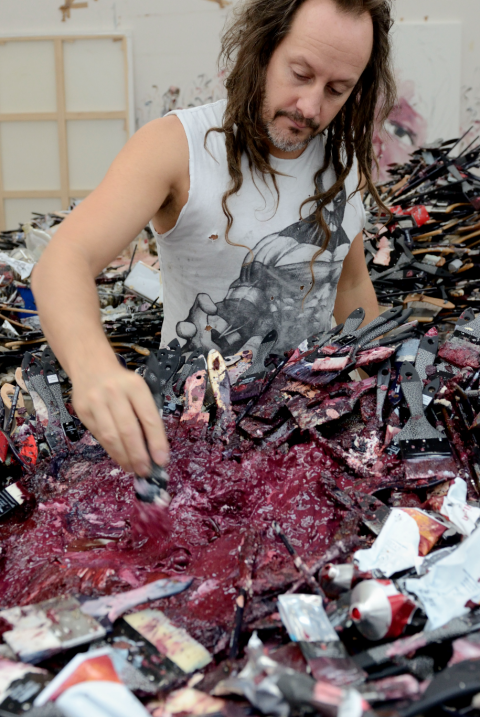
- Born: 15 June 1965 (age 61); Grasse, France
- Known for: Painting, sculpture
- Website: www.pasquaphilippe.com

Philippe Pasqua (born 15 June 1965) is a French contemporary artist, known for his paintings, sculptures and drawings. Self-taught and (solitary), he is best known for his paintings of Vanitas and considered one of the major artists of his generation.

== Biography ==
Born in Grasse on 15 June 1965, Philippe Pasqua moved to Paris in 1975. When he was about 18, he started painting and moved to New-York where he lived for about two years. In 1985 he was noticed for his paintings of fetishes and voodoo inspired figures and makes his gallery debut in 1990. According to Art critic José Alvare, Philippe Pasqua has a playful approach to his work, despite being extremely productive and living an ascetic life : he sleeps very little and does not drink or smoke. In only three years, between 1995 and 1997, he created about a thousand pieces. In 2006 the collector and art dealer Jose Mugrabi bought about a hundred of his works, and asked for some sort of exclusivity on Pasqua's artistic production. Art historian Pierre Restany has also shown interest in the work of Philippe Pasqua and has written about it. In 2011, Pasqua's signature came second in Artprice rankings of French contemporary artists.

== Painting ==
Philippe Pasqua says he likes painting better than other medium. His works depict transsexuality, Down syndrome, and blindness. Julián Zugazagoitiai, director of El Museo del Barrio in New York City, accounts for Pasqua's choices this way: "Through painting, Philippe Pasqua confers dignity to subjects that are, sadly, dealt with by the media without any aesthetic or ethical consideration. As opposed to sensational media coverage that make of us all indulgent onlookers of the immediate present, Philippe Pasqua’s work opens us to the transcendence of painting and questions the moral values of our time." The many layers of paint applied on the canvas to show the brutality of matter are in total opposition with the vulnerable and fragile human subjects of Pasqua's series. Pasqua uses mostly red, brown and grey hues, in an attempt to render the color of flesh. His series of drawings depict the same subjects as his paintings but with voluntarily blurred outlines. Philippe Pasqua makes palimpsests, works on paper that mix serigraphy, print, paint, pastel and inking techniques. He comes back relentlessly to his own works, adding new colors or drawing over them. In the late 1990s, he worked together with Jean-Luc Moulène, painting over his photographs, including his snapshots of Notre-Dame de Paris.

== Sculpture ==
Philippe Pasqua started sculpting in 1990 with the series "Vanitas", consisting of several works of up to three meters high. He also photographed the works, and considered the photographs to be works in themselves. When sculpting, he uses bronze, onyx, solid silver, Carrara marble, human skulls covered in pigments, gold, or silver leaves, and tattooed leather. Through the 2000s, and even more so during the 2010s, sculpture gained more focus in his work. His sculpture works are extremely diverse and include bronze olive trees, clown-headed monkeys staged to evoke Leonardo da Vinci’s Last Supper, Tyrannosaurus-Rex, and a Ferrari covered in tattooed animal hide and hung vertically on a wall. In 2017, he was invited by the Oceanographic Museum of Monaco to raise awareness about ocean protection. On this occasion, he exhibited monumental sculptures of sea animals. The previous artist invited by the museum was Damien Hirst, with whom Pasqua had worked in the past. The following year he exhibited in the park and castle of the Chamarande domaine, near Paris.

== Shows ==
=== Solo shows ===
- 1990 : Espace Confluence, Paris
- 1991 : Galerie Wo Mang et Partners, Paris
- 1995 :
  - Château de Grouchy, Osny, France
  - Espace Dautzenberg, Brussels
  - The International Center, Detroit (Michigan)
- 1996 : Galerie Boulakia, Paris
- 1998 : Yvonamor Palix Art Space, Mexico
- 1999 : Lucien Durand Gallery, Paris
- 2001 : Trauma, Galerie Hengevoss-Durkop-Jensen, Hamburg
- 2002 :
  - Les miroirs de l’âme (Portraits 1989 – 2001), Palais Bénédictine, Fécamp
  - Bloc portrait, Galerie Hengevoss-Durkop, Hamburg
- 2003 :
  - Galerie Hengevoss Dûrkop-Jensen, Hamburg
  - Lucille, RX Gallery, Paris
- 2004 : Métamorphoses, RX Gallery, Paris
- 2005 : Centre culturel de la ville de Metz
- 2006 :
  - Patrick Painter Gallery, Santa Monica (California)
  - Spike Gallery, New York
- 2007 : Philippe Pasqua – Pulsion, RX Gallery and Enrico Navarra gallery, Paris
- 2009 :
  - Philippe Pasqua, Stiftung Ahlers Pro Arte, Hanover, curated by par Peter Lipke
  - Crâne, ArtCurial, Paris
  - Crâne, Isola di San Servolo, Venice
- 2010 :
  - Philippe Pasqua, Peintures et dessins, Moscow Museum of Modern Art, curated by par Marc Ivalevitch and David Rosenberg en partenariat avec la RX Gallery
  - Mea culpa, The Storage, Paris
- 2011 :
  - Silence, The Storage, Paris
  - Philippe Pasqua, Absolute Art Gallery, Knokke, Belgium
- 2012 :
  - Philippe Pasqua, Peintures et Dessins, Art Révolution, Taipei, Taïwan
  - Philippe Pasqua, Peintures récentes, RX Gallery, Paris
  - Philippe Pasqua, Peinture, Fondation Fernet-Branca, Saint-Louis
  - Work in Progress, Peinture et Sculpture, The Storage, Paris
  - Philippe Pasqua, Gallery Hyundai, Seoul
  - Philippe Pasqua in London, Opera Gallery, London
- 2013 :
  - Philippe Pasqua, Peinture, Dessin et Sculpture, Art Stage Singapour, Singapore
- 2017 :
  - Borderline, Oceanographic museum of Monaco, Monaco
  - Memento Mori, Zemack Contemporary Art, Tel Aviv
- 2018 :
  - Allegoria, Domaine de Chamarande, Essonne
- 2021
  - Face to face, Espace Art Absolument, Paris

=== Group shows ===
- 1990: Maison des Arts, Beausset, France
- 1992: Salon des Grands et Jeunes d’Aujourd'hui, Paris
- 1994 :
  - Association Aides, Espace Cardin, Paris
  - Chaussures d’Artistes, Fundacio Joan Miró, Barcelona
- 1997 : 3 Visions de l’Art contemporain français, Martini Gallery, Hong Kong
- 1998 :
  - 80 artistes autour du Mondial, Enrico Navarra Gallery, Paris (avec Jeff Koons, Rotella, César, Matta, Clemente, Nam June Paik...)
  - Hygiène, Yvonar Palix Art Space, Mexico (avec Orlan, Aziz + Cucher, Sandy Skoglund, Steve Miler)
  - Hygiène, La Source Foundation, La Guéroulde, France
  - Collection Ahrenberg : 50 ans d’histoire de l’art, curated by par Erick Öge, Museum of Fine Arts, Mons, Belgium
- 1999 :
  - Fétiches, Fétichismes, Passage du Retz, Paris, curated by Jean Michel Ribettes
  - Naço & Friends, Espace Via, Paris
- 2000 :
  - Narcisse blessé, Passage du Retz, Paris, curated by par Jean Michel Ribettes
  - Collages d’hier et d’aujourd'hui, Lucien Durand Gallery- Le Gaillard, Paris
- 2001 : Face Off, Aeroplastics Damasquine Gallery, Brussels
- 2002 : Inauguration, RX Gallery, Paris
- 2004 :
  - Beyond Paradise, RX Gallery, Paris
  - Artistes contemporain des galeries du 8e arrondissement, Ville de Paris
- 2005 :
  - Quintessence, RX Gallery, Paris
  - Au-delà du corps, Contemporary Art Biennale, Aixe-sur-Vienne, France
  - A3, Place St Sulpice, Paris, curated by Sophie Actis
- 2006 : Soutine and Modern Art, Cheim and Read Gallery, New-York.
- 2010 :
  - New Era, RX Gallery, Paris
  - C'est la vie ! Vanités de Caravage à Damien Hirst, curated by Patrizia Nitti, art director of Musée Maillol, Claudio Strinati, executive director
- 2011 :
  - Drawing Now, RX Gallery, Paris
  - ART Paris, RX Gallery, Paris
  - ART Miami, RX Gallery, Paris
- 2012 :
  - Plaisir, RX Gallery, Paris
  - Popening, Laurent Strouk Gallery, Paris
  - Damien Hirst vs Philippe Pasqua, Laurent Strouk Gallery, Paris
- 2015 :
  - Collection Luciano Benetton, CAC Màlaga, Spain
- 2017 :
  - Recomposition, RX Gallery, Paris
- 2018 :
  - Action ! La Nouvelle École française : première époque, Bastille Design Center, Paris
- 2019 :
  - Stage Beasts, Fondation Villa Datris, L'Isle-sur-la-Sorgue

== Publications ==
- Pierre Restany, Jean-Michel Ribettes (1999). Philippe-Pasqua (in French). Paris: SAGA - Stephen lacy- Galerie Lucien Durand - Le Gaillard. ISBN 978-2951442405.
- Trauma, Catalogue d'exposition (in French). Hamburg: galerie Hengevoss Dürkop. 2001.
- Emmanuel Daydé, Cynthia Fleury (2002). Philippe Pasqua, les miroirs de l'âme (in French). Fécamp: Bénédictine SA.
  - Emmanuel Daydé, Michel Schouman (2002). Philippe Pasqua, Paradis blanc (in French). Paris: RX Gallery.
- Restany, Pierre (2004). "Une leçon de liberté dans la peinture". Beaux-Arts Magazine.
- Zugazagoitia, Julián (2004). "De l'efficacité dans la peinture". Beaux Arts Magazine.
- Fleury, Cynthia (2004). "La beauté, simplement". Beaux Arts Magazine.
- David Simard, Michel Schouman (2004). "Pasqua, ou l'oeil du profane". Beaux Arts Magazine.
- Hengevoss-Dürkop, Kerstin (2004). "De la chair". Beaux Arts Magazine.
- Walberg, Michel (2005). Philippe Pasqua (in French). Paris: La Différence « Mains et Merveilles ».
- Tully, Judd (2006). Philippe Pasqua (in French). Santa Monica, California: Patrick Painter Gallery.
- Maurice Tuchman, Estil Dunow (2006). The New Landscape/the New Still Life : Soutine and Modern Art. New-York: Cheim & Read.
- Debailleux, Henri-François (2007). Philippe Pasqua. Paris: RX Gallery and Enrico Navarra gallery.
- Krempel, Ulrich (2009). Philippe Pasqua. Hanovre: Stiftung Kestner Pro Arte.
- Jonathan Katz, Joshua Mack (2010). Sex. London: Philipps de Pury & Company.
- Rosenberg, David (2010). Philippe Pasqua, « Paradise. Paris: Edition Skira.
- Rosenberg, David (2010). Palimpseste.
- Corbu, Jean (2011). Philippe Pasqua - Drawings or Sculptures. Paris: Galerie Laurent Strouk.
- Farameh, Patrice (2011). Skull Style. Skulls in Contemporary Art and Design. New-York: The Curated Collection.
- Philippe Pasqua, " Work in Progress ". Saint-Ouen L’Aumône. 2012.
- Philippe Pasqua, " Monographie ". Paris: Edition du Regard. 2012.
- Philippe Pasqua. Saint-Louis: Edition de Saint-Louis, Fondation Fernet-Branca. 2012.
- Mald, Cyrille (2014). Philippe Pasqua, " Autoportrait ", préface de Frédéric Mitterrand. Paris: Edition Séguier.
- Chabot, André (2014). Philippe Pasqua, " Skull box ". Paris: Editions Ynox.
- Guionneau-Joie, Florence (2017). Philippe Pasqua, " Borderline ". Paris: Beaux-Arts Editions.
- Debailleux, Henri-François (2017). Philippe Pasqua, " Monumental ". Paris: Albin Michel.

== See also ==
- Damien Hirst
- Vanitas
