= Mediterranean Science Commission =

Marine science research organization

Mediterranean Science Commission (CIESM)
Mission
- The Mediterranean Science Commission is the flagship for multilateral research in the Mediterranean and Black Seas. A unique coalition of 23 Member Governments and hundreds of marine Institutes, CIESM links marine scientists from all shores of the Basin and adjacent seas, to share the latest findings and advances in oceanography.

Foundation
- November 1919

Director General
- Prof. Laura Giuliano

Website
- www.ciesm.org

The Mediterranean Science Commission, or CIESM, (French: Commission Internationale pour l'Exploration Scientifique de la Méditerranée) is an independent organization that unites 23 member Ssates, hundreds of marine istitutes, and thousands of marine researchers from all shores of the Mediterranean Basin and adjacent seas, to engage in marine scientific explorations and exchange on the latest advances in oceanography.

Created by an international conference held in Madrid, Spain, in November 1919 the Commission promotes multilateral international research on marine sciences via the international use of national research stations and scientific exchange. Originally the organization was restricted to countries bordering the Mediterranean and Black Seas and is now open to other countries engaged in marine research in the broad region.

== Early years ==
Two professors, the Italian Decio Vinciguerra and the German Otto Krümmel, thought it would be useful for the fishing industry to promote oceanographic exploration of the Mediterranean Sea. Based on Vinciguerra's proposal, the ninth International Geographical Union in Geneva endorsed the principle of a Commission in July 1908 and decided a committee should define the organization. The committee was formed and first met in Monaco on 30 March 1910 under the chairmanship of Albert I, Prince of Monaco, in the premises of the recently opened Oceanographic Museum. Two important, innovative principles emerged: the commission had to be free from political interference, and the countries would be represented at Government level so that the scientific advice of the commission would carry weight. The next meeting was held in Rome in February 1914, and endorsed the principle that all the countries bordering the Mediterranean and the Black Sea should be eligible for membership.

The advent of World War I prevented Spain from hosting the Constituent Assembly later in 1914. It was finally held in Madrid in November 1919 — after a preparatory meeting (Paris) in June 1919 — and chaired by King Alfonso XIII of Spain. The founding meeting had representatives from Egypt, France, Greece, Italy, Monaco, Spain, Tunisia and Turkey. The newly formed Commission elected Monaco, in the person of Prince Albert I, to the presidency. Italy joined in 1924.

From 1919 until 1939 several marine observatories were founded around the Mediterranean under the impulsion of CIESM in countries such as Algeria, Tunisia, and Italy. Specialized French, Italian, and Spanish vessels undertook mapping and research campaigns in the Strait of Gibraltar, the Bosphorus, the Strait of Messina, and the Gulf of Gabès. The membership quickly expanded to include Romania (1925), the Kingdom of Serbs (1927), Turkey (1928) and territories then under British, French or Spanish mandate: Cyprus (1919), Palestine (1929), Syria and Lebanon (1930), Spanish Protectorate of Morocco (1933). The Commission published a Bulletin and scientific Reports of Congresses held then every two years, plus detailed, illustrated sheets of the Faune et Flore de Méditerranée under the direction of Prof. Louis Joubin

== Post-World War II ==
The work of the commission was suspended during World War II (1939-1945), but despite pressure to transfer responsibility to the United Nations, meetings resumed in 1951 in Paris where the seat of the commission had been transferred in 1924. In 1956, at the 15th CIESM Congress in Istanbul, Monaco was elected to the presidency in the person of Rainier III, Prince of Monaco, while Prof. Jean Furnestin continued until 1966 his substantial refoundation work as Secretary General. He would be succeeded as Secretary in 1966 by Commandant Jacques Yves Cousteau and by Prof. François Doumenge, who served in that function from 1988 until 2007. At that time the CIESM Council decided to merge the position of Secretary General with that of Director General, a function held by Prof. Frederic Briand until September 2023, date when his elected successor Dr Laura Giuliano assumed the position.

With a change in statutes to allow members of non-coastal countries engaged in marine research, Germany became a member in 1969, followed by Switzerland in 1970 and Portugal in 2004.

Under the statutes of the commission as of 30 November 1970, the headquarters was in Monaco and the official language remained French. The president was elected for four years at the plenary Congress and Assembly, and was eligible for be reelection. The plenary Congress was held every two years, and decided on subjects to be studied.

== Examples of work ==
The Mediterranean Science Commission is the only organization that specializes in multi-lateral marine research in the Mediterranean Sea. Through its network of scientists, it can quickly detect changes and alert governments and others who must take action, and provide neutral and authoritative advice on issues related to marine ecosystems by ways of Monographs, reports, Congresses.

In 1993 CIESM responded to a request from the European Parliament and issued a detailed assessment of Marine Pollution in the Mediterranean. In 1998 CIESM began running research workshops which continue to produce widely read monographs on emerging issues. Subjects have covered a diversity of sectors ranging from marine volcanoes and canyons, marine connectivity, the Messinian Salinity Crisis, Marine Peace Parks, impacts of climatic change on the ocean, species extinctions, marine biotechnologies, deep waters, acidification, emergent pollutants, food webs from marine viruses to whales, invasive species, social studies of fisheries, etc. At that time the Commission started to deliver morphometric maps of the Mediterranean seabed, based on modern imagery provided by multibeam swath. Between 2013 and 2020 the CIESM JellyWatch program engaged an extensive survey of jellyfish outbreaks, monitored on a weekly basis in coastal waters from Morocco to the Black Sea.

The Commission assumes a leading role in documenting in CIESM Atlases on Exotic Fishes, Crustaceans, Molluscs, Seaweeds the continuous arrival of tropical invaders in the Mediterranean Sea, mostly from Indo-Pacific origin, and tracks the status and routes of endangered species such as sharks, rays and seabirds.

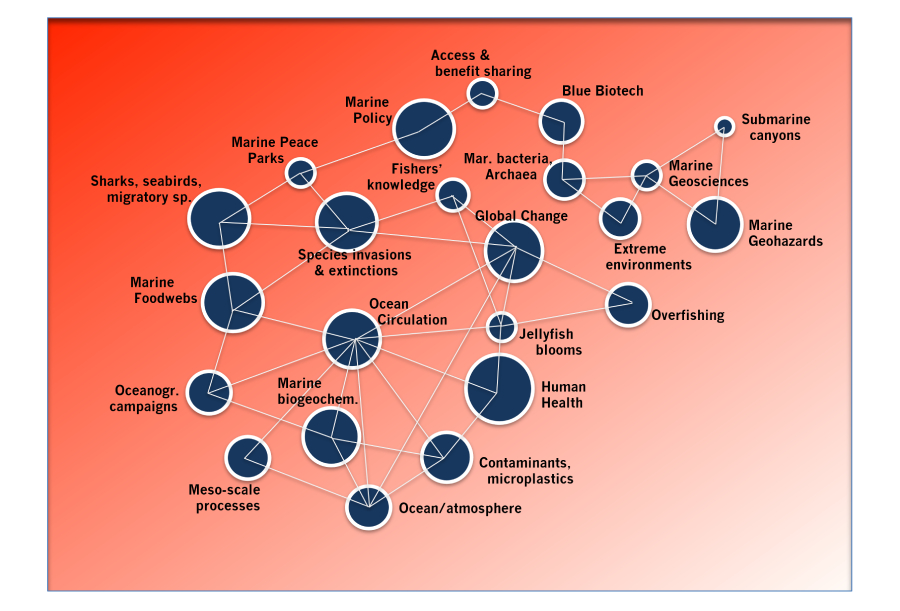
Main sectors of marine research currently investigated by the Mediterranean Science Commission

The latest CIESM Congresses were held in Venice (2010), Marseille (2013), Kiel (2016), Cascais (2019), and Palermo (2024).

== Current organization ==
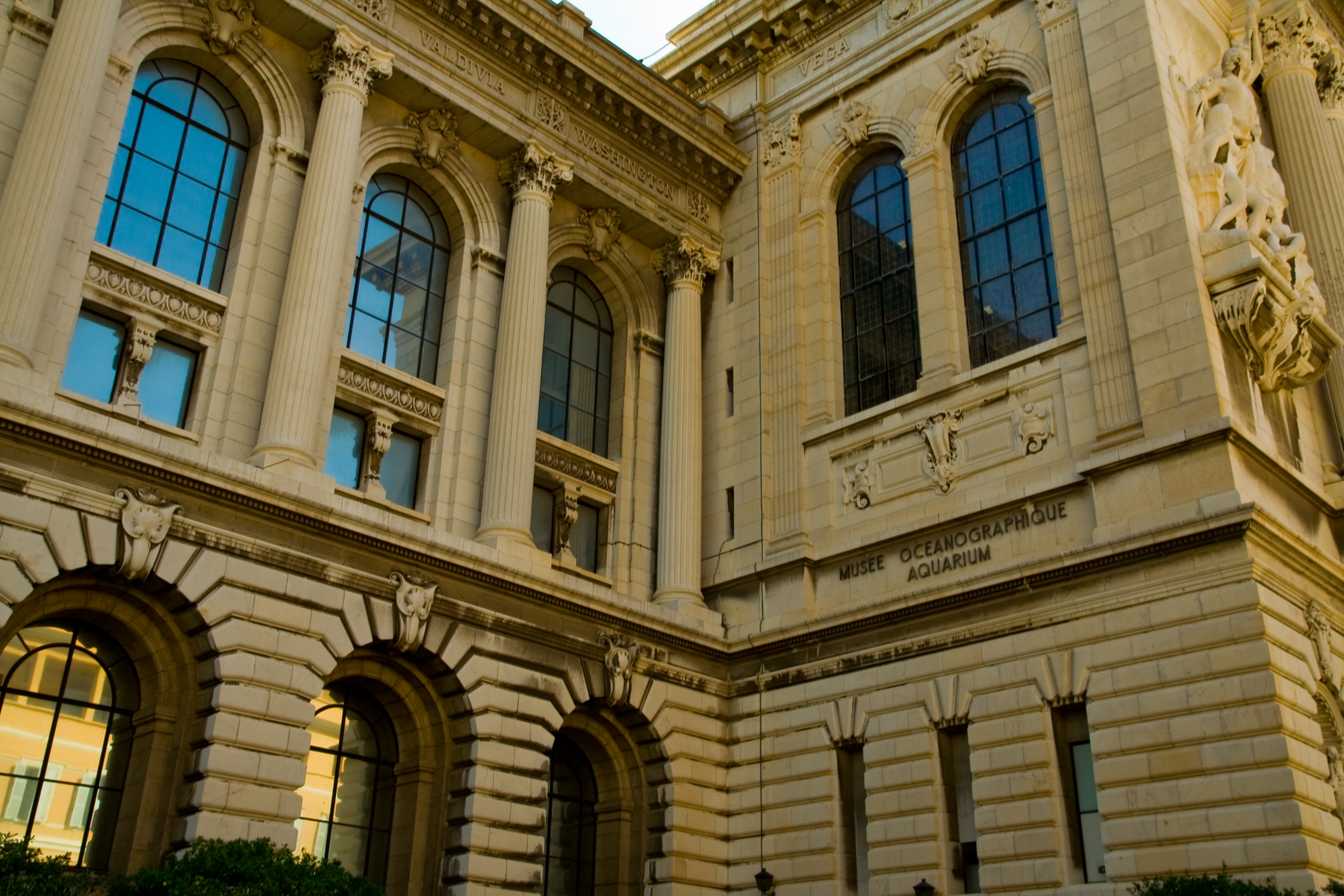
Oceanographic Museum, Monaco, where CIESM was conceived in 1910

Since 1992 CIESM Congresses have been held every three years, except for a five-year parenthesis due to the Covid_19 pandemic. The next CIESM Congress will take place in Palermo in October 2024. The current presidency of the Commission is held by Monaco, in the person of Albert II, Prince of Monaco.

In 1992 Croatia, Slovenia, and Ukraine became members, followed by the Russian Federation (2013) and Albania (Dec. 2019).

Today the 23 Member States are: Albania, Algeria, Croatia, Cyprus, Egypt, France, Germany, Greece, Israel, Italy, Lebanon, Malta, Monaco, Morocco, Portugal, Romania, Russia, Slovenia, Spain, Switzerland, Syria, Tunisia and Turkey.

CIESM works closely with various UN International Agencies such as UNESCO, IOC, IMO, WMO, or FAO and regional 'sister' organisations like ICES and UNEP/ MAP

The Commission draws on the work of researchers in over 50 countries. In 1996 CIESM restructured itself into six scientific committees:

- Marine Geosciences,
- Physics and Climate of the Ocean,
- Marine Biogeochemistry,
- Marine Microbiology and Biotechnology,
- Marine Ecosystems and Living Resources,
- Coastal Systems and Marine Policies.
