= Museum of Old Monaco =

Museum in Monaco

- Musée du Vieux Monaco
- Established: 1974
- Location: Monaco-Ville, Monaco

Museum of Old Monaco (French: Musée du Vieux Monaco) is a museum of Monaco’s material heritage. It displays ceramics, paintings, furniture and costumes, as well as sets out scenes of daily life from Le Rocher, Monaco's Old Town. The fundamental mission of the museum is to preserve Monegasque identity.

== History ==
In 1924, representatives of old Monegasque families founded The National Committee of Monegasque Traditions (Le Comité National des Traditions Monégasques) with the aim to preserve their national identity. Among the missions of the Committee was to preserve material heritage of Monaco by the means of the museum.

In 1974, Museum of Old Monaco, housed in a building of the National Committee of Monegasque Traditions, was inaugurated by Prince Rainier III and Princess Grace.

== Overview ==
Museum of Old Monaco is installed on three levels. There are three halls in the museum: the Monaco hall, the military hall, and the hall dedicated to religion. In museum halls, visitors can see everyday objects of Monegasques, the uniforms and weapons of Monaco militaries, historical documents, and letters of the king of France, dated September 1644.

The museum brings together objects from Monaco's heritage that tell the history of the country and its traditions. Another objective of the Museum is preservation of Monegasque language by hosting these heritage items alongside the revival of the spoken word.

Among other things, the museum's collection contains paintings and sculptures created by artists from around the world. In particular, an 18th-century nursery is represented here; a statue of Henri IV as a child and created by Baron Francois Bosio; portrait of the musician Honore Langle, professor and one of the founders of the Paris Conservatory and the founder of the Naples Conservatory, painted by French artist Marie Vigee-Lebrun.
