= Amelia Wilson (1809 ship) =

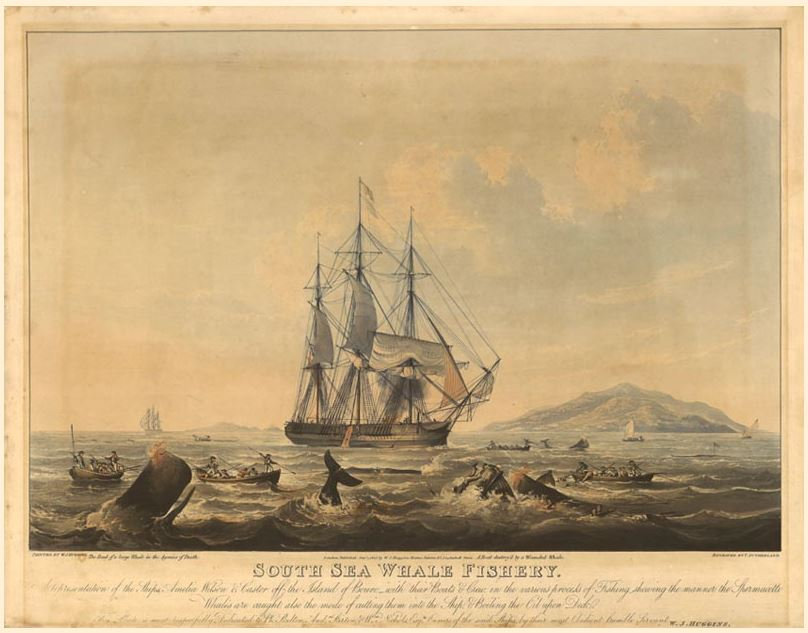
- South Sea Whale Fisher Ships Amelia Wilson and Castor off the Island of Buru, J.W.Huggins, 1825

History

France
- Captured: 1809

United Kingdom
- Name: Amelia Wilson
- Acquired: 1809 by purchase of a prize
- Fate: Wrecked 1833

General characteristics
- Tons burthen: 332, or 361, or 362, or 36245/94 (bm)
- Length: 104 ft 5 in (31.8 m)
- Beam: 28 ft 6 in (8.7 m)
- Armament: 1810:6 × 9-pounder + 6 × 12-pounder guns; 1812:10 × 9-pounder + 2 × 6-pounder guns; 1813:8 × 18-pounder guns (of the "New Construction")

Amelia Wilson was built in France under another name and captured by the British in 1809. Her new owners renamed her and she became a West Indiaman. She later became a whaler and was wrecked in 1833 on her fifth whaling voyage.

== Career ==
The prize court condemned the French vessel on 21 April 1809. She then first appears in Lloyd's Register in 1810. Her owner was Wilson & Co., suggesting that her name represents a relative of the owner. She underwent repairs in that year. She then traded with the West Indies. She underwent a good repair in 1813 from which she emerged with an increased burthen.

Year	Master	Owner	Trade
1810	Todd	Wilson & Co.	London—St Vincent
1811	Todd; R. Banks	Wilson & Co.	London—St Vincent
1812	R. Banks; J. Ainsley	Wilson	London—St Vincent
1813	Gallaway	Blackburn	Plymouth—London; London transport
1814	Gallway; G. Frior (or Friar)	Blackburn	London transport London—Havana
1815	G. Frier	Frier & Co.	London—Havana
1816	G. Frier	Frier & Co.	London—Jamaica
1818	G.Frier; A. Stirton	Isaacs; Scallon & Co.	London; London—Southern Fishery

Whaling voyage #1 (1818–1819): Captain Andrew Stirton sailed from Britain on 13 January 1818, bound for Timor. He returned on 13 August 1819 with 650 casks of whale oil.

Whaling voyage #2 (1819–1821): Captain Michael Underwood sailed from Britain on 27 September 1819, bound for Timor. In January 1821 she was at Ambon, in company with Greenwich. Underwood returned to Britain on 30 November 1821 with 650 casks.

Whaling voyage #3 (1822–1824): Amelia Wilson underwent a thorough repair in 1822. Captain Underwood then sailed from Britain on 11 March 1822, again bound for Timor. She left St Helena on 20 July 1824 and arrived in Britain on 1 October 1824 with 800 casks.

Whaling voyage #4 (1824–1827): Captain Underwood sailed from Britain on 30 November 1824, bound for Timor and the seas off Japan. On 12 January 1825 Amelia Wilson was at Teneriffe, and by 2 May she was at Timor. In November she was off Guam. On 14 January 1827 she was in the Timor Sea again. At some point she landed 300 tuns of sperm oil at St Helena. On 21 September she returned to England with 650 casks.

Amelia Wilson was almost rebuilt in 1829. She then made a voyage to India as a merchantman. One edition of the Register of Shipping has her sailing to India under a license from the British East India Company. A different edition of the Register of Shipping (1830) has her leaving England on 21 March 1829.

Year	Master	Owner	Trade
1829	Harris	Blythe & Co.	London—Bombay
1830	Harris	Blythe & Co.	London—Bombay
1831	Harris	Blythe & Co.	London—Bombay
1832	Wilson	Clay	London—South Seas Fisheries

Whaling voyage #5 (1831–loss in 1833): Captain Wilson sailed Amelia Wilson from Britain on 23 November 1831, bound for the Pacific Ocean. On 12 January 1832 she was at 19°S 28°W.

== Fate ==
Amelia Wilson was wrecked on rocks about 40 miles north of Port Lloyd in the Bonin Islands in May or June 1833. The crew were saved, but some 1440 barrels of oil were lost. Three boats, with 12 men, arrived at Port Lloyd.
