= Yacht Amélia =

Yacht Amélia may refer to one of several yachts owned by King Carlos I of Portugal:

- Yacht Amélia (1896), a yacht bought for the oceanographic campaign of 1896
- Yacht Amélia (1897), a 300-ton vessel, obtained for the campaign of 1897
- Yacht Amélia (1899), a Scottish-built vessel obtained for the campaign of 1899; bought by American oilman Henry Clay Pierce in 1902 as his personal yacht, Yacona; later acquired by the United States Navy as USS Yacona (SP-617)
- Amélia IV was a passenger ship built in 1900 as SS Banshee. As Amélia IV, she served as the Royal yacht for the Portuguese monarch from 1901 to 1910. When the monarchy of Portugal was overthrown in 1910, Amélia IV transported the new young King, Manuel II, to safety in Gibraltar. From 1910 to 1937 she served the Portuguese Navy as an auxiliary ship under the name Cinco de Outubro.
