= Amelia (1813 ship) =

History

United States
- Builder: Massachusetts, America
- Launched: 1809, or 1810
- Captured: 1813

United Kingdom
- Name: Amelia
- Acquired: 1813 by purchase of a prize
- Fate: Foundered in October 1829, or in 1830

General characteristics
- Tons burthen: 231, or 241, or 24188/94 (bm)
- Length: 89 ft 2 in (27.2 m)
- Beam: 25 ft 4 in (7.7 m)
- Propulsion: Sail
- Armament: 2 × 4-pounder guns

Amelia was built in Massachusetts in 1809 or 1810. The British captured her in 1813. She sailed as a British merchantman until she foundered in 1829 or 1830.

== Career ==
Amelia entered Lloyd's Register (LR) in 1813 with Lowes master and owner, and trade London. The Register of Shipping (RS) for 1814 showed with J.Low, master, R.Gutt, owner, and trade London–Lisbon, changing to London–Demerara.

LR for 1819 showed her master changing to J.Storey, who is also listed as becoming her owner, and her trade changing to Belfast–St Andero. The 1820 volume showed her owner as Revell & Co., and her trade changing from Belfast–St Andero to London–Malta. the RS did not show the change of ownership to Revell & Co., and later editions of LR returned the ownership to Storey.

Amelia traded to Quebec, and the Baltic. In 1826-1827 she traded to Memel. A letter dated Elsinore 4 April 1826 reported that Amelia, Storey, master, from London to Memel, had had to be cut from her anchor due to strong winds. Then LL reported on 11 December 1827 that officers of the Coastal Blockade had seized Amelia as she was on her way from Memel to Portsmouth. (Note: The Coastal Blockade had been created in 1817 to suppress smuggling on the Kent and Sussex coasts. It was run along naval lines and incorporated active and former naval officers and men, as well as vessels of the Royal Navy. The Blockade was disbanded in March 1831 with some of its personnel retiring, and others transferring to the Customs Service or the Navy.)

== Fate ==
One source reports that Amelia foundered on 24 April 1830. However, there is no further corroboration of that. Several sources, such as The Times, have an Amelia foundering in the Atlantic on 27 October 1829 at 49°N 19°W. Her crew were saved. Like The Times, LL too reported on 7 May 1830 that Amelia had foundered, and gave the name of her master as Storey. One source gives the date as 24 October. Amelia was last listed in LR and the RS in the 1830 volumes, published in 1829.
