= Monaco Naval Museum =

Museum in Monaco

- Musée Naval de Monaco
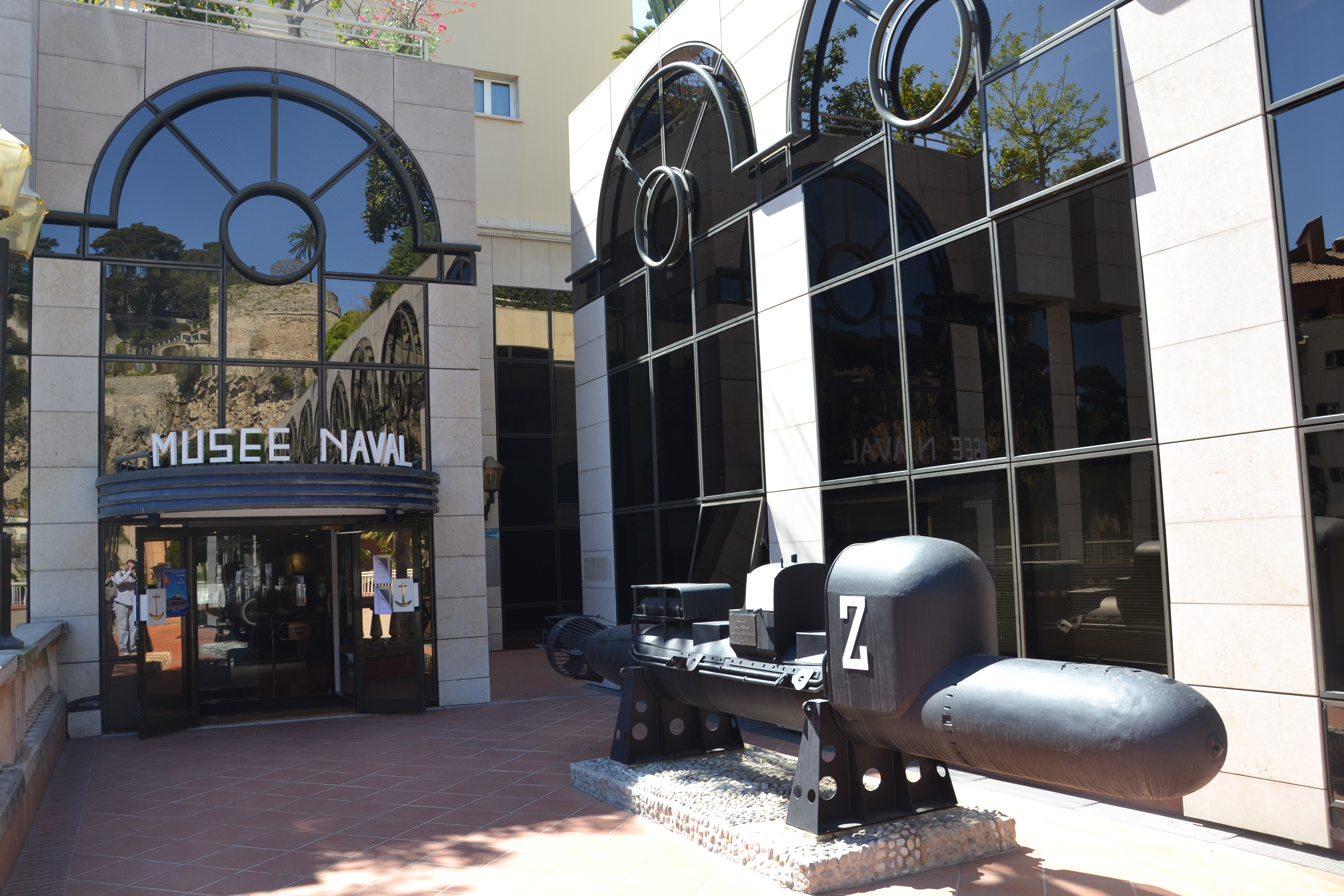
- Established: 1993; 33 years ago
- Location: Fontvieille, Monaco
- Type: Naval museum

The Naval Museum (French: Musée naval de Monaco) is a museum of model ships, paintings and maritime objects in Fontvieille, Monaco. It is an international museum, dedicated to all navies from ancient times to our era.

== History ==
As a result of Professor Claude Pallanca’s passion for sea and boats, who gathered and built a large collection of model ships, the Naval Museum was founded in 1993 with the help of Prince Rainier III of Monaco, the Monegasque Administration and the friendship of Bernard Fautrier and Charles Ballerio. Professor Pallanca’s collection was enriched by numerous antique models from the personal collection of Prince Rainier III of Monaco. Some of the oldest models in the collection were built by Prince Albert I himself in 1874.

== Overview ==
Monaco’s Naval Museum exhibits a collection of more than 250 model ships, paintings and maritime objects. The full museum’s collection consists of more than 1,200 scale models and hundreds of navy-related objects. As an international museum, Naval Museum is dedicated to all navies from ancient times until present days.

Among the most outstanding exhibits should be mentioned a funerary boat found in a tomb in Egypt, as well as classical Roman and Greek vessels. Full-scale model Viking longboats, Venetian gondolas and Spanish galleons accurately represent their historical times. Also on displays the visitors can see the models of famous liners such as the Titanic and the France; trainings ships such as the Amerigo Vespucci and the Belem; and numerous warships from the Jeanne d’Arc to the battleship Missouri.

Second World War is represented by numerous submarines, as well as a minelayer and a Maiale manned torpedo. The model ship collection is enriched with 550 paintings illustrating ships and aircraft from the Second World War collected by Professor Pallanca.

Of special note amongst modern ships in the collection is a 5 m long model of the American aircraft carrier “Nimitz”.
