= Amelia (1796 ship) =

History
- Name: Amelia
- Operator: East India Company
- Fate: Captured

General characteristics
- Tons burthen: 1,000 or 1,400

Amelia was a ship of 1,000 or 1,400 tons (bm), built at Demaun. In 1796 the British East India Company (EIC) engaged her in India to carry rice from Bengal to Britain for the account of the British government, which was importing grain to address high prices for wheat in Britain following a poor harvest.

As Amelia approached Britain a French squadron captured her. By some reports the capture took place in the Bay of Biscay. However, Lloyd's List reported that a squadron of French frigates had captured an East Indiaman, "supposed to be the Amelia, from Bengal", with a cargo of rice and sugar. The capture apparently took place off the Western Isles, and the captors sent their prize into Corunna. The next issue of Lloyd's List confirmed that Amelia had been sent into Corunna, and identified her master as "Crawford". Her master was Coutts Crawford. (Note: Hackman conflates this Amelia with Amelia.)

The EIC charged the loss of the cargo to "his Majesty's Government".

Reportedly, a Bombay house later purchased Amelia and sold her to the Portuguese at Macao.
