= Amelia (1795 ship) =

History

Great Britain
- Name: Amelia
- Owner: 1795:Lushington; 1800:Simms, or Sims, or Simes
- Builder: France
- Launched: 1787
- Acquired: 1795 as a prize
- Fate: Last listed 1806 with stale data

General characteristics
- Tons burthen: 264, or 266, (bm)
- Propulsion: Sail
- Armament: 1796:6 × 6-pounder guns; 1798:6 × 6-pounder guns + 4 × 18-pounder carronades; 1800:12 × 6-pounder guns

Amelia was built in France in 1787. The British captured her in 1793. She became a general trader that made one voyage as a whaler in the British southern whale fishery before returning to trading. She also made one voyage as a slave ship in the triangular trade in enslaved people. She was last listed in 1806, but the data is stale.

== Career ==
Although the British captured Amelia in 1793, she does not appear in Lloyd's Register until 1795. At that time her master is Whitock, her owner is Lushington, and her trade is London—St Vincent. (Note: Hackman conflates this Amelia with a different Amelia.)

In late 1795 and early 1796, Amelia sailed as part of Admiral Hugh Cloberry Christian's expedition to the West Indies. After numerous false starts aborted by weather issues, the fleet sailed on 26 April to invade St Lucia, with troops under Lieutenant-General Sir Ralph Abercromby. St Lucia surrendered to the British on 25 May. The British went on to capture Saint Vincent and Grenada. It is not clear when Amelia returned to Britain.

Lloyd's Register for 1798 shows Amelia's master as Scott, her owner as Lushington, and her trade as South Seas Fishery.

Amelia was at Rio de Janeiro in June 1797 to replenish her food and water. She was reported to have been at the Galapagos in August/September 1798 She returned to England in March 1799.

The Register of Shipping for 1800 reported that W. Scott was still master of Amelia, and that her trade was London—Cape of Good Hope. Lloyd's Register for 1800 showed Amelia's master changing to Higgins, and her owner to Sims. The 1801 volume confirmed the changes and showed Amelia's trade as Liverpool—Africa, something that generally signals a slave trader. Amelia, Isaac Higgins, master, John Sims, owner, sailed from London to West Central Africa on 13 October 1800. She sailed from Falmouth only on 14 January 1801. She arrived at Jamaica on 21 August 1801 with 267.

Amelia left Jamaica for London, but then had to put back because she had become leaky.
