= Amélia IV =

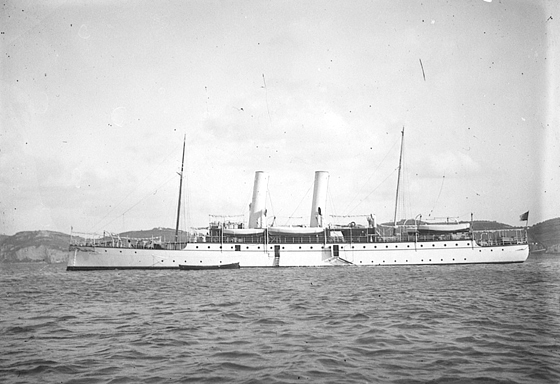
- The Royal yacht Amélia IV

History
- Name: 1900–1901: SS Banshsee; 1901–1911: SS Amélia IV; 1911–1937: NRP Cinco de Outubro
- Port of registry: 1900–1901: (United Kingdom of Great Britain and Ireland); 1901–1937: (Portugal)
- Builder: Ramage and Ferguson, Leith
- Launched: 17 July 1900

General characteristics
- Tonnage: 899 gross register tons (GRT)
- Length: 230 feet (70 m)
- Beam: 29.5 feet (9.0 m)
- Depth: 18.5 feet (5.6 m)

Amélia IV was a passenger ship built in 1900 as SS Banshee. As Amélia IV, she served as the Royal yacht for the Portuguese monarch from 1901 to 1910. From 1910 to 1937 she served the Portuguese Navy as an auxiliary ship under the name Cinco de Outubro.

== History ==
Cox & King of London designed Amélia IV and Ramage & Ferguson of Leith built her for Colonel Harry McCalmont. Miss Lawson of London launched her on 17 July 1900.

King Carlos I of Portugal purchased her for use as the Royal Yacht and she arrived in Portugal on 2 September 1901. She served a dual purpose as the Portuguese Navy also used her for oceanographic research. In 1908 she travelled to the Exhibition of the centenary of the opening of the Ports of Brazil with presents from the by then late Carlos I of Portugal.

When the monarchy of Portugal was overthrown in 1910, Amélia IV transported the new young King, Manuel II, to safety in Gibraltar.

She was then renamed Cinco de Outubro. The Portuguese Navy finally disposed of her in 1937.
