= Jardin Exotique, Monaco =

Jardin Exotique Giardi̍n eso̍ticu (Monégasque)
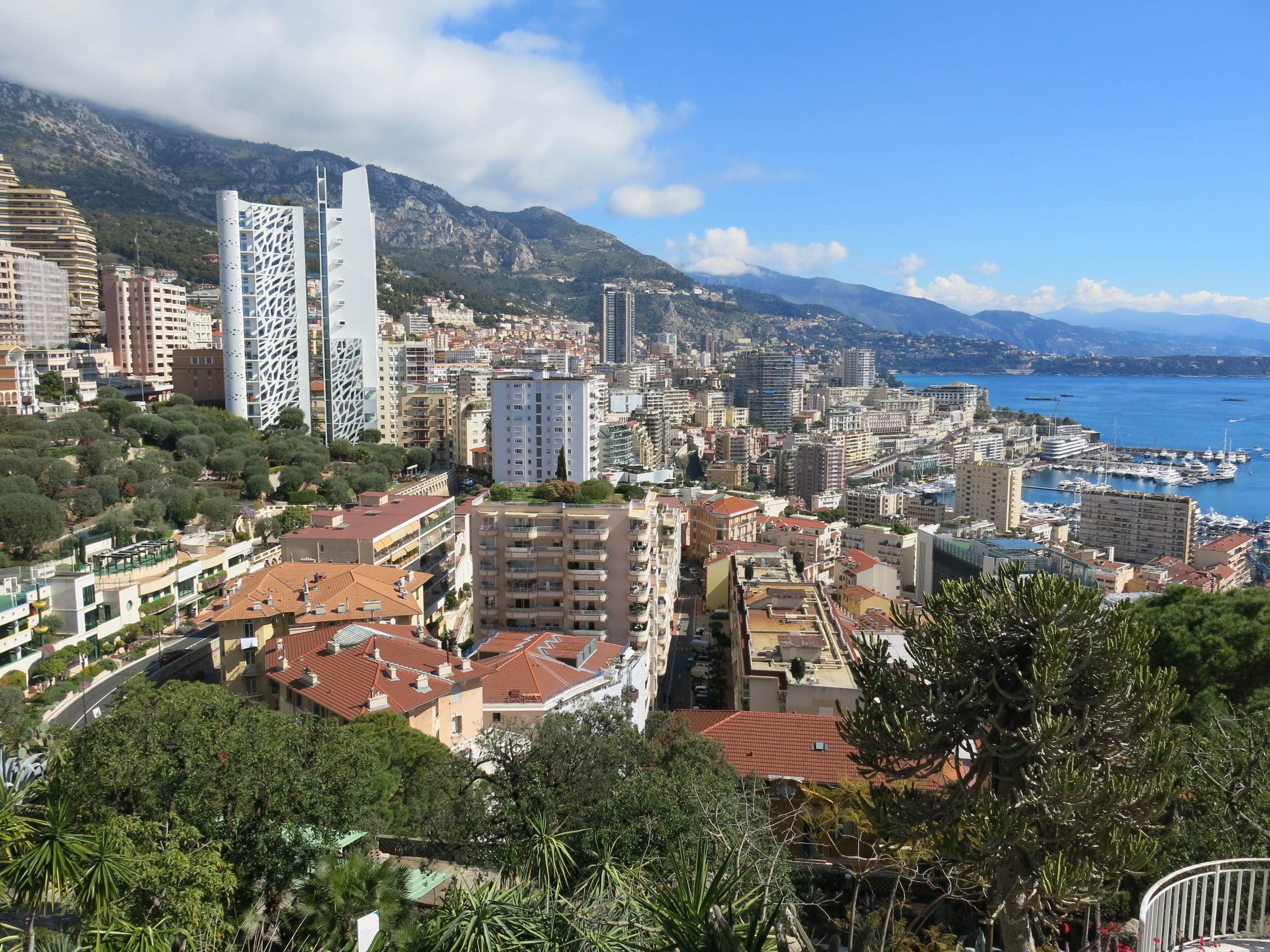
- A view of Jardin Exotique in 2019

- Location in Monaco
- Coordinates: 43°43′53″N 7°24′50″E
- Country: Monaco

Area
  - Total: 23.4865 ha (58.036 acres)

Population (2008)
  - Total: 5,374
- Established 2013 from Les Révoires and La Colle

Jardin Exotique (French pronunciation: [ʒaʁdɛ̃ ɛɡzɔtik]; Monégasque: Giardi̍n eso̍ticu) is the westernmost ward in the Principality of Monaco. It is incorporated in the traditional quarter of La Condamine.

Jardin Exotique ward was created in 2013, from the Les Révoires and La Colle wards, as part of an overall re-redistricting at that time. The name comes from the exotic gardens located in this ward, the Jardin Exotique de Monaco which has many rare imported plants especially cacti and succulents.

== History ==
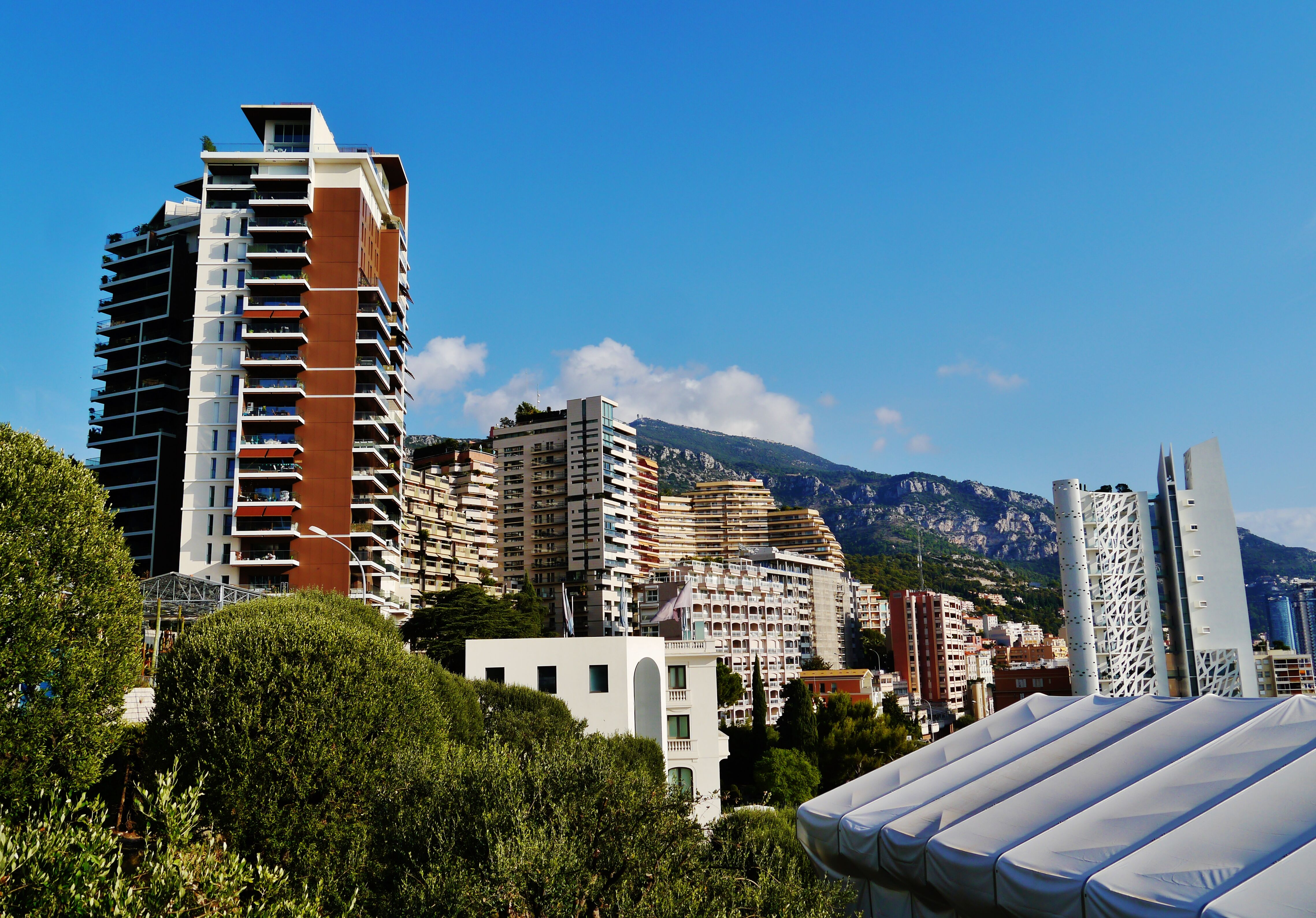
Jardin Exotique, 2021

Jardin Exotique was formed in 2013 from the merger of the residential areas of La Colle and Les Révoires. An underground and pedestrian axis is scheduled to be completed in 2023 and it will link the top of Boulevard du Jardin Exotique to Fontvieille.

== Geography ==
Jardin Exotique lies on the northwestern side of the principality. La Colle and Les Révoires are generally considered part of Moneghetti, even though they were their own administrative wards. Jardin Exotique runs directly along the neighbouring French towns of Beausoleil and Cap-d'Ail, as well as the Monégasque ward Moneghetti. The newly created ward covers an area of 23.49 hectares (58.0 acres).

The Les Révoires area, which has steep inclines, offers views of the Rock of Monaco and the Mediterranean. It is also the location of the Chemin des Révoires, Monaco's highest point, 162 metres (531 ft) above sea level.

== Landmarks ==
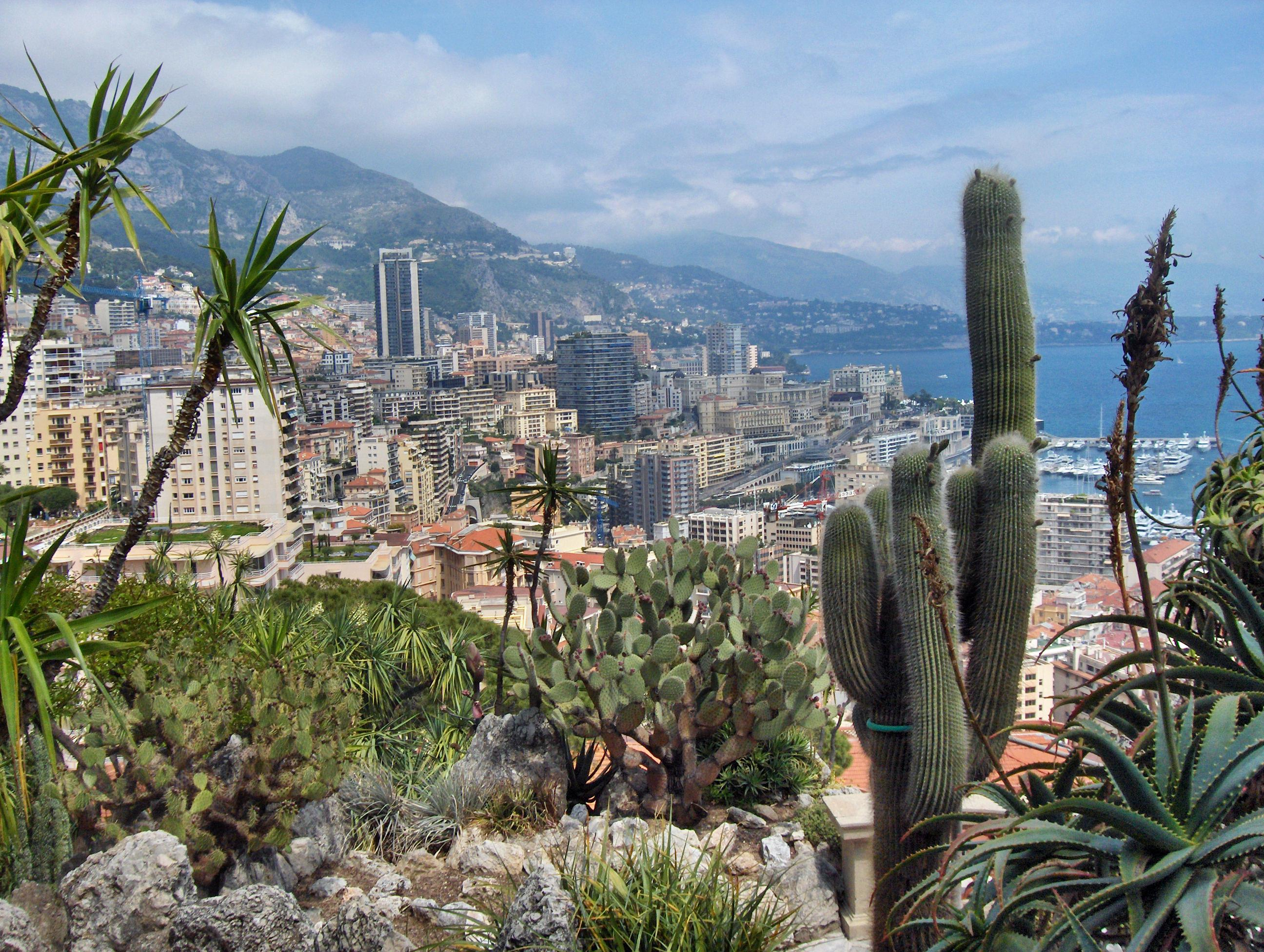
A view from the exotic gardens (Jardin Exotique)

Jardin Exotique contains the celebrated Jardin Exotique de Monaco (French: for Exotic Garden of Monaco) in which the ward is named after. Founded by Prince Albert I in 1933, the garden contains a rich collection of over a thousand succulent and cacti. There is also a museum, called the Prehistoric Anthropology, located within the Exotic Garden, which displays a variety of prehistoric remains.

Through La Colle, Princess Grace Hospital Centre, Monaco's only public hospital, is located in the westernmost portion of Jardin Exotique.

== See also ==
- Municipality of Monaco
- Geography of Monaco
