= Les Révoires =

Former ward of Monaco

- Former ward of Monaco
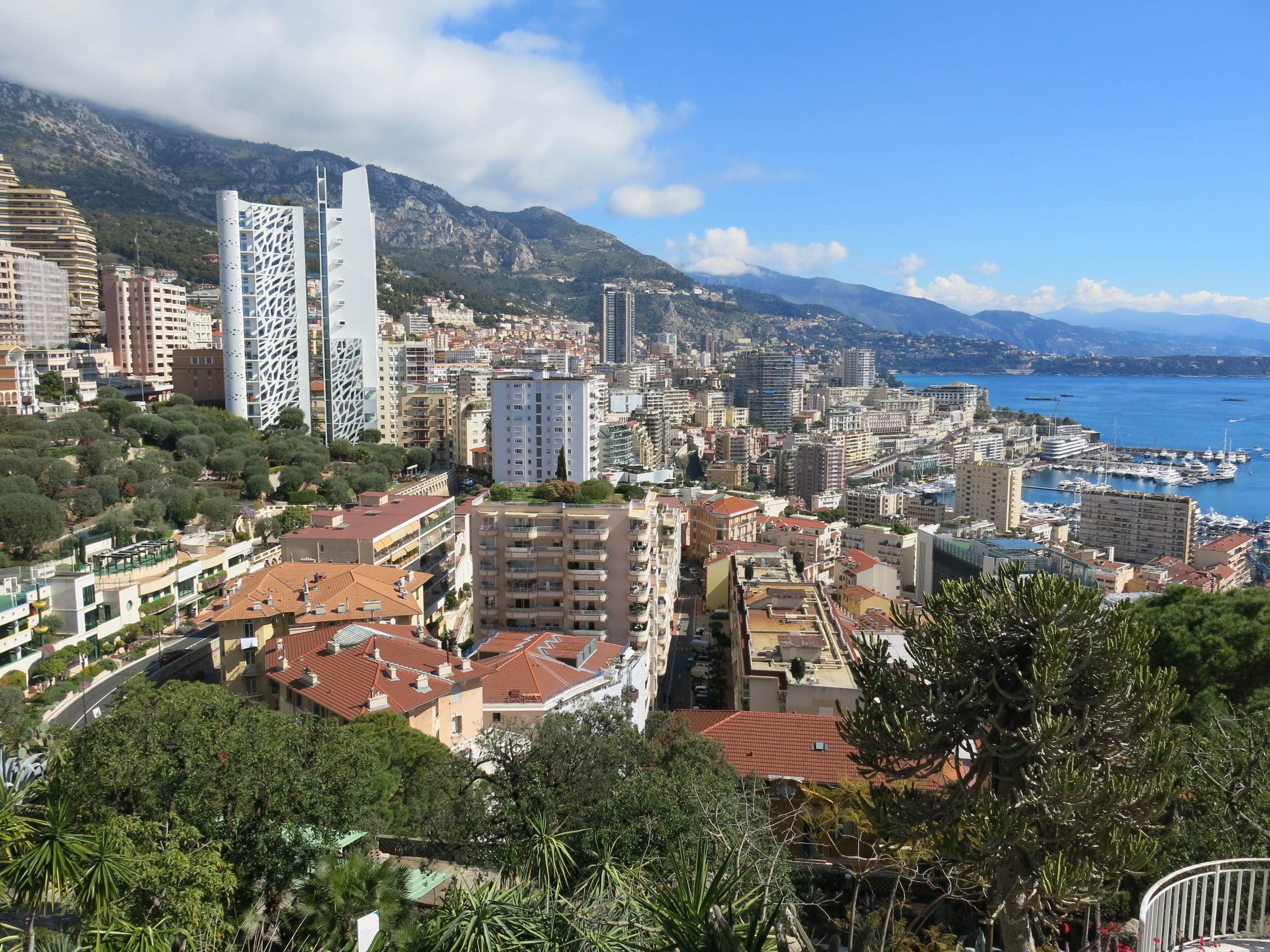
- A view of Monaco from the Jardin Exotique

- Location in Monaco

- Location in relation to France
- Coordinates: 43°43′57″N 7°24′50″E
- Country: Monaco

Area
  - Total: 0.07 km^{2} (0.027 sq mi)

Population (2008)
  - Total: 2,545

Les Révoires (French pronunciation: [le ʁevwaʁ]) is a northwestern area in the Principality of Monaco. It is a residential and tourist area, part of the traditional quarter of La Condamine. In 2008, it had a population of 2,545. Les Révoires was a ward of Monaco until 2013, when it was merged with La Colle into the new Jardin Exotique ward.

== Geography ==
Les Révoires lies on the northwestern side of the principality, just north of Moneghetti. Les Révoires is generally considered part of Moneghetti, even though it was its own administrative ward. It runs directly along the neighbouring French towns of Beausoleil and Cap-d'Ail, as well as the Monégasque wards of La Colle and Moneghetti.

Les Révoires, which has steep inclines, offers views of the Rock of Monaco and the Mediterranean. It is also the location of the Chemin des Révoires, Monaco's highest point, 162 m above sea level.

== Demographics ==
Les Révoires was the smallest ward in Monaco in terms of both population and land size. Les Révoires has a population of 2,545 and covers a total of 0.09 km^{2}.

Monaco has ten state-operated schools, four private schools and one university; there are no state schools and private schools located in the district. There are also very few government offices located in this district, although there is a regional police station near the Les Révoires–Moneghetti border.

== Tourism ==
Les Révoires is more of a residential area, but there are many chain-owned hotels and bed and breakfasts, along the upper slopes of Mont Agel, helping Monaco's high-end tourist industry.

== Landmarks ==
As Les Révoires is located outside the municipality centre, its real estate sales are generally less than that of other wards. Real estate sales average 6% to 10% less than neighboring Fontvieille or La Condamine. The district contains the celebrated Jardin Exotique de Monaco (French: for Exotic Garden of Monaco), founded by Prince Albert I in 1933. The garden contains a rich collection of over a thousand succulent and cacti. There is also a museum, called the Prehistoric Anthropology, located within the Exotic Garden, which displays a variety of prehistoric remains.

== See also ==
- Municipality of Monaco
