= La Colle, Monaco =

La Colle
- Former ward of Monaco
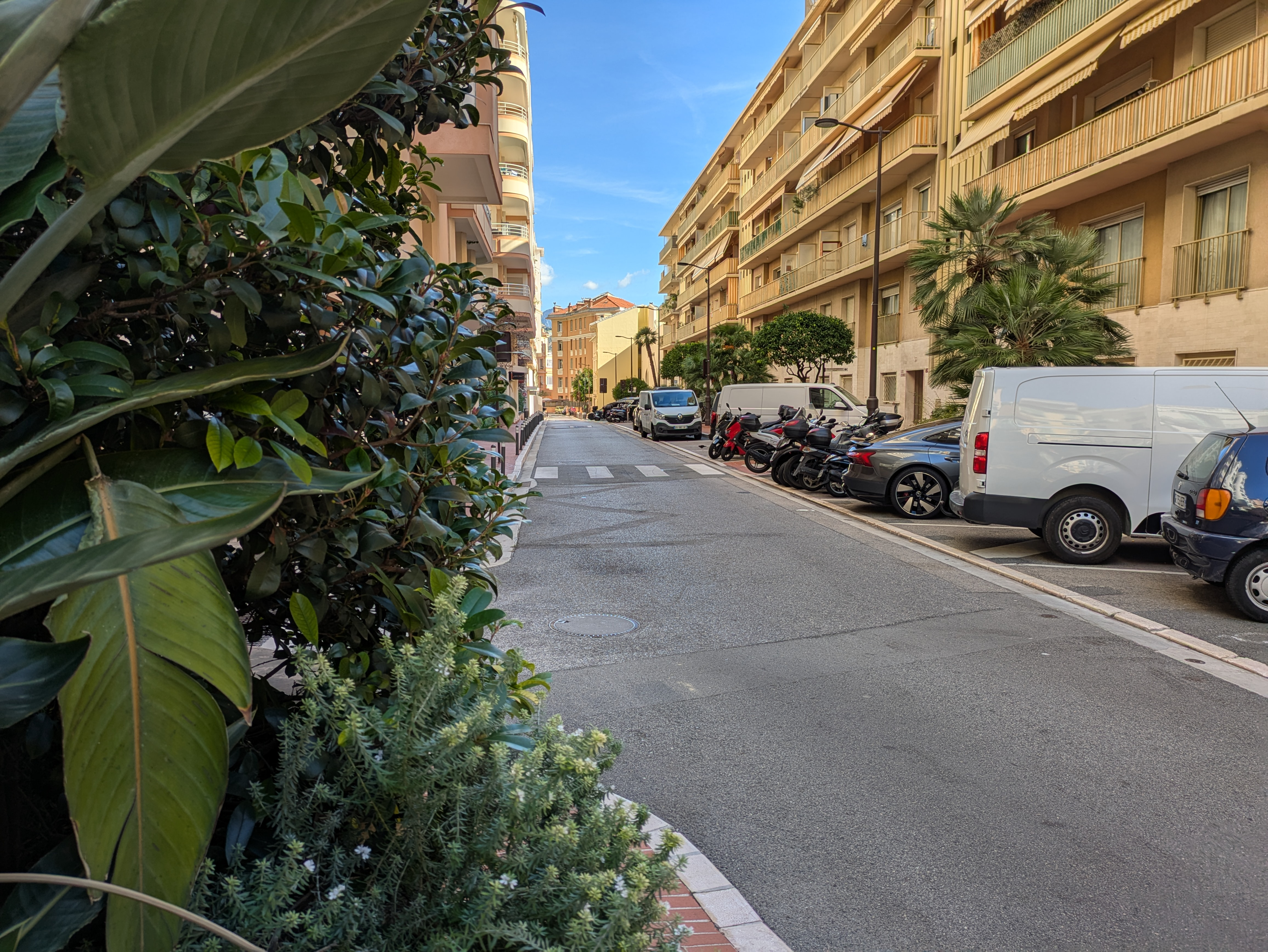

- Location in Monaco

- Location in relation to France
- Coordinates: 43°43′56.64″N 7°25′5.52″E
- Country: Monaco

Area
  - Total: 0.188073 km^{2} (0.072615 sq mi)

Population (2008)
  - Total: 2,829

La Colle (French pronunciation: [la kɔl]) was a northwestern residential area in the Principality of Monaco, part of the traditional Quartier of Moneghetti. It was also one of the ten modern administrative wards of Monaco until 2013, when it was merged with Les Révoires to form Jardin Exotique.

== Geography ==
La Colle lies on the northwestern side of the principality, just north of Fontvieille. La Colle is generally considered part of Moneghetti, even though it was its own administrative ward. It runs directly along the neighbouring French towns of Beausoleil and Cap-d'Ail, as well as the Monégasque wards of Les Révoires (formerly), Fontvieille and Moneghetti.

=== Demographics ===
La Colle was the second-smallest ward in Monaco in terms of population (Monaco-Ville is the smallest), as well as the third-smallest in terms of land size. La Colle had a population of 2,829 and an area of 0.11 square kilometres (0.042 sq mi).

Monaco has ten state-operated schools, four private schools and one university; one state school and one private school are located in La Colle.

Princess Grace Hospital, Monaco's only hospital, is located in the westernmost portion of La Colle.

== Economy ==
La Colle takes after Fontvieille in being one of the more industrial areas in Monaco. For instance Venturi and its subsidiary Voxan have an eco-friendly factory located here. Its location within Monaco helps to expedite shipping; located more on the outside of the city, manufacturing causes little problem to Monaco's high-end tourist industry.

Even though La Colle is more industrialized, there is real estate along the Les Révoires-La Colle border. Because La Colle's location more outside the city center, its real estate sales are generally less. Averaging 13% to 18% less than neighboring Fontvieille or La Condamine.

=== Tourism ===
La Colle is more of an industrial area, but some small hotels can be found here, helping Monaco's high-end tourist industry.

== See also ==
- Municipality of Monaco
