= Saint Michel, Monaco =

Saint Michel
- Former ward of Monaco
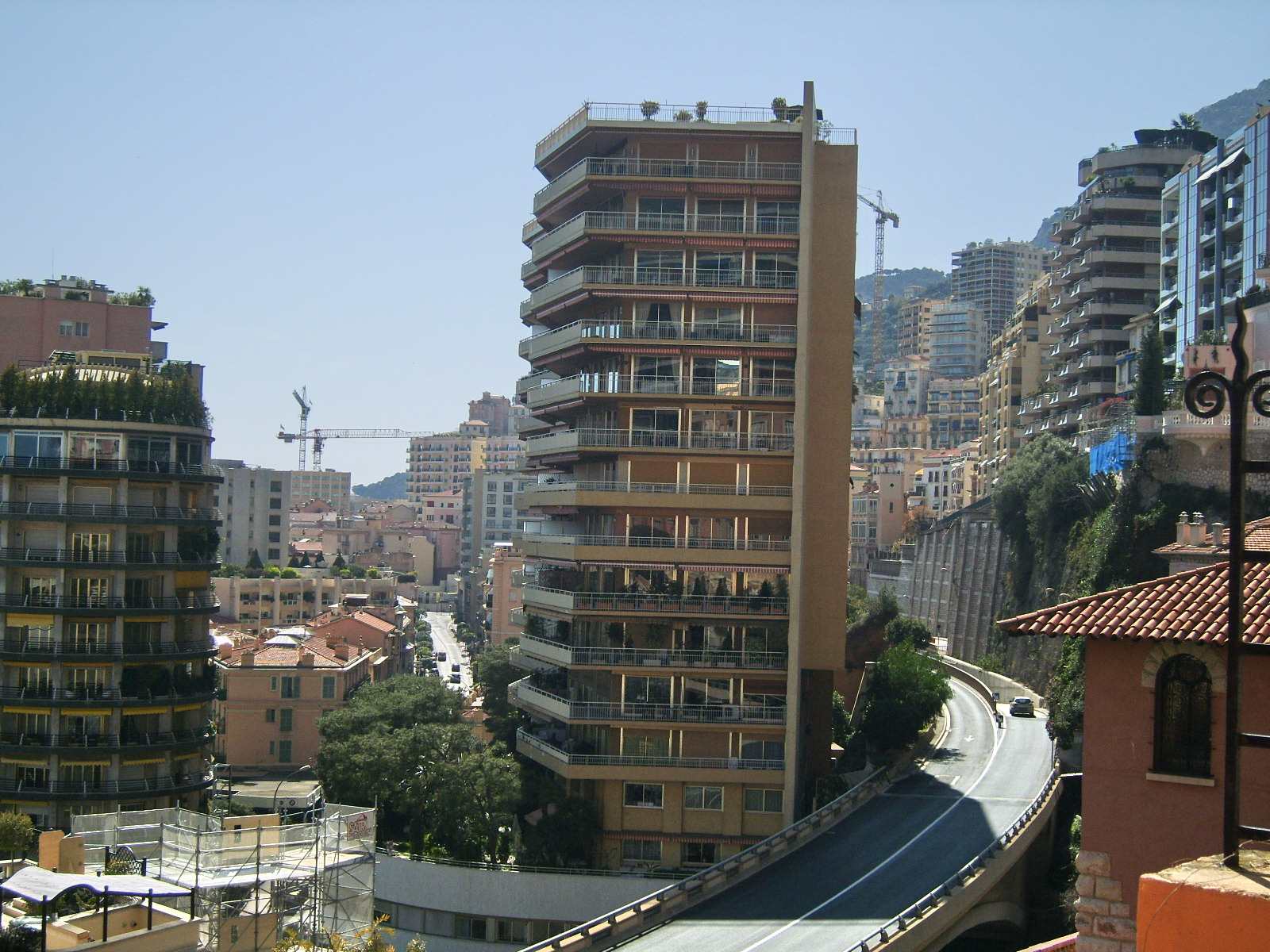
- Overlooking Saint Michel from the east looking towards Moneghetti to the west

- Location in Monaco

- Location in relation to France
- Coordinates: 43°44′25.8″N 7°25′25.32″E
- Country: Monaco

Area
  - Total: 0.142223 km^{2} (0.054913 sq mi)

Population (2008)
  - Total: 3,907

Saint Michel (Monégasque: Santu Michê [ˈsaŋtu miˈkeː]) is a northern-central residential area in the Principality of Monaco, part of the traditional Quartier of Monte Carlo. It was also one of the ten modern administrative wards of Monaco until the 2013 redistricting process.

== Geography ==
Saint Michel lies on the north-centre of the principality, just north of Monte Carlo. Saint Michel is generally considered part of Monte Carlo even though it is its own administrative Ward. It runs directly along the neighbouring French town of Beausoleil, as well as the Monégasque wards of Monte Carlo, Saint Roman and Moneghetti.

== Demographics ==
Saint Michel was the third-largest ward in Monaco in terms of population and the fourth-smallest in terms of land size. It had a population of 3,907 and convers 0.14 km^{2}.

Monaco has ten state-operated schools, four private schools and one university; two state schools and two private schools are located in the district.

== Tourism ==
Saint Michel is a residential area.

== Features ==
Saint Michel is a residential community, but boasts many boutiques and restaurants. As Saint Michel is located relatively outside the centre of the municipality, its real estate sales are generally less than those of other districts; averaging 10% to 15% less than neighbouring Monte Carlo or La Condamine. Saint Michel also boasts a wide variety of car dealers, such as Honda, BMW and Tesla.

== See also ==
- Municipality of Monaco
