= Santos-Dumont's experiments in Monaco =

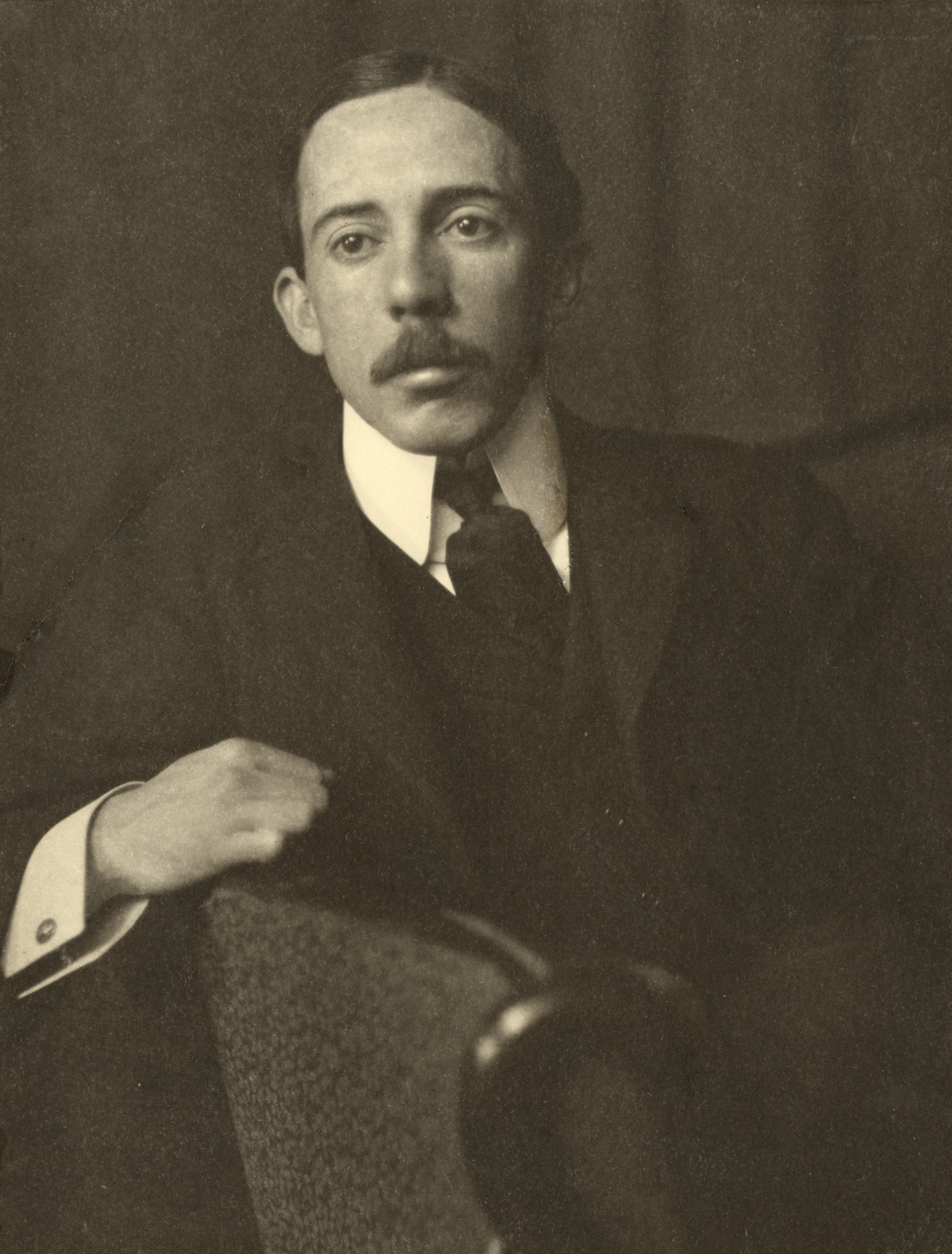
- Santos-Dumont in 1902
- Date: January 28 – February 14, 1902
- Location: Monaco
- Type: Aeronautical experiments
- Patron: Albert I
- Organised by: Alberto Santos-Dumont
- Outcome: Accident in February 14, 1902

After winning the Deutsch prize in 1901 by circling the Eiffel Tower in his airship, Brazilian aviator and inventor Alberto Santos-Dumont brought the airship to Monaco in 1902 to conduct a series of experiments. The goals were to gather information which would be useful in determining its military utility over water for crossings and reconnaissance.

Santos-Dumont made five flights between January 28 and February 14, 1902. The last flight ended in an accident in the Bay of Monaco from which he escaped, but the ship was severely damaged.

== Background ==
In 1901, Santos-Dumont won the Deutsch prize after circling the Eiffel Tower with the airship No. 6. Displeased by the controversial award ceremony and exhausted by media attention, Santos-Dumont resigned from the Aéro-Club de France and accepted an invitation from Prince Albert I of Monaco with Duc de Dino as intermediary, after having begun negotiations in late October, to work in Monaco. In part, he also accepted the invitation because of the climate in Paris at that time of year and due to the fact that the Prince of Monaco would build an Aerodrome and finance his experiments.

His goals in Monaco were to prove the airship's military utility over water, due to military analysts having suggested that airships could perform reconnaissance missions for the navy, as well as a possible crossing from France to Corsica in February 1902. (Note: Jorge 2018, p. 201 says it would be a journey from Nice to La Spezia; crossing the Mediterranean, flying over Corsica, Sardinia and finally landing in Algeria.)

== Experiments ==
=== Preparation ===
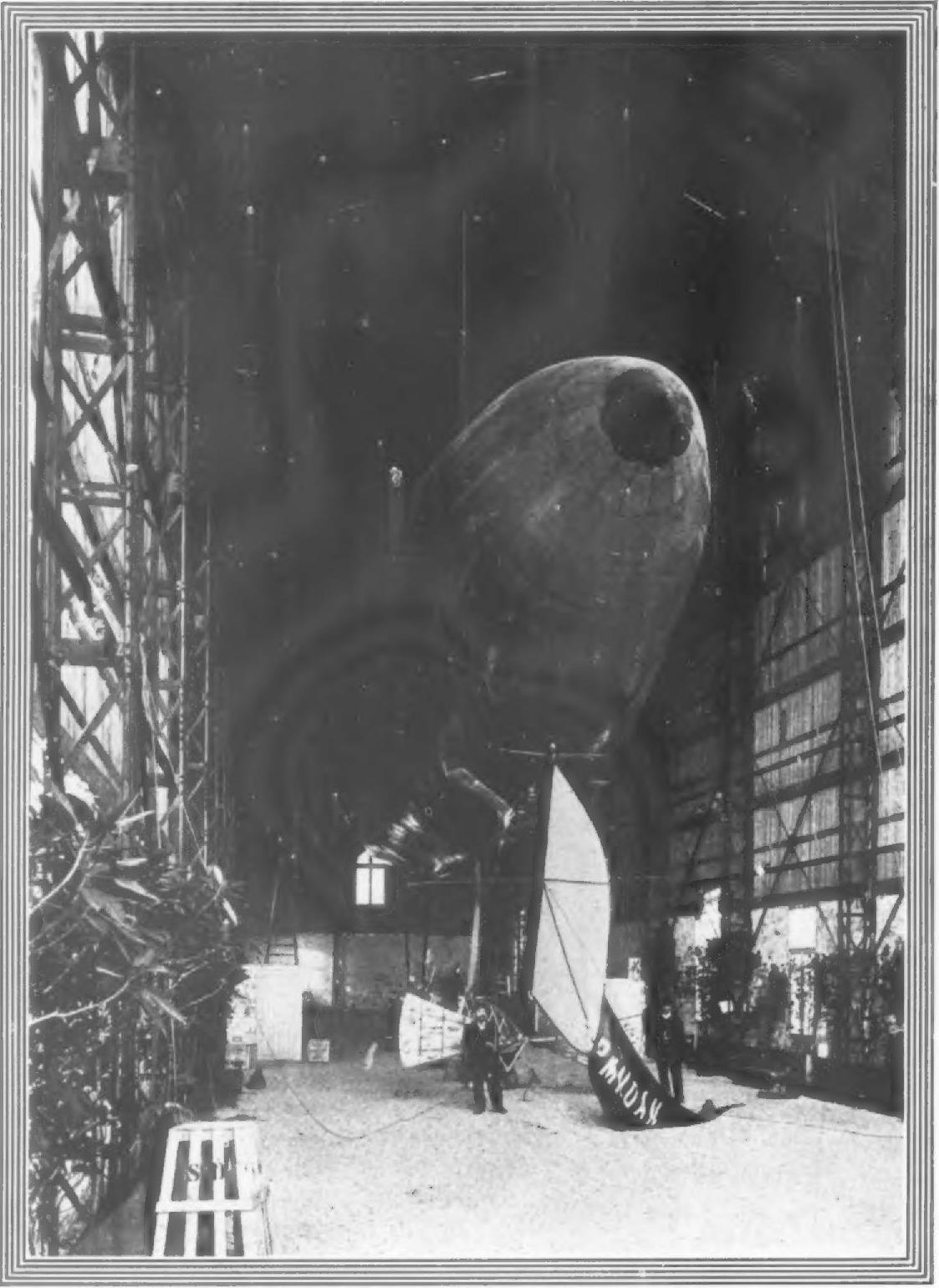
Inside the Aerodrome.

Santos-Dumont had arrived in Monaco at the end of January 1902, when the Aerodrome, built on Boulevard de la Condamine and occupying the areas called the "Radziwill Lands", was already complete. The hydrogen production plant was built in one month, which, added to the time it took to build the Aerodrome, was a three-month process. It was a solid construction, to avoid the same fate as the French Aerodrome in Toulon, which was carried away by storms.

The Aerodrome was 182 feet long, 33 feet wide, and 50 feet high. The doors were 50 feet high by 17 feet wide and weighed 9680 pounds, making them the largest ever built at the time, breaking a world weight record and being the responsibility of Santos-Dumont's engineer-builder, Mr. Cabiraut. Despite their dimensions, the balance was such that on the day of the Aerodrome's opening they were opened by Princes Constantinesco and Marescotti Ruspoli, aged 8 and 10 respectively.

The hydrogen plant, between Louis and Antoinette Streets, held six metric tons of sulfuric acid along with the same amount of iron filings that, when mixed, created eight cubic meters of hydrogen per hour, allowing the airship to be inflated in ten hours. The public panicked when the Bay of Monaco turned red on January 22, 1902, which led to the suspension of the process and Santos-Dumont had to explain to the authorities that the material released was only rust and harmless to marine life, and that it had passed through three stages of purification before being released.

=== 1st flight ===
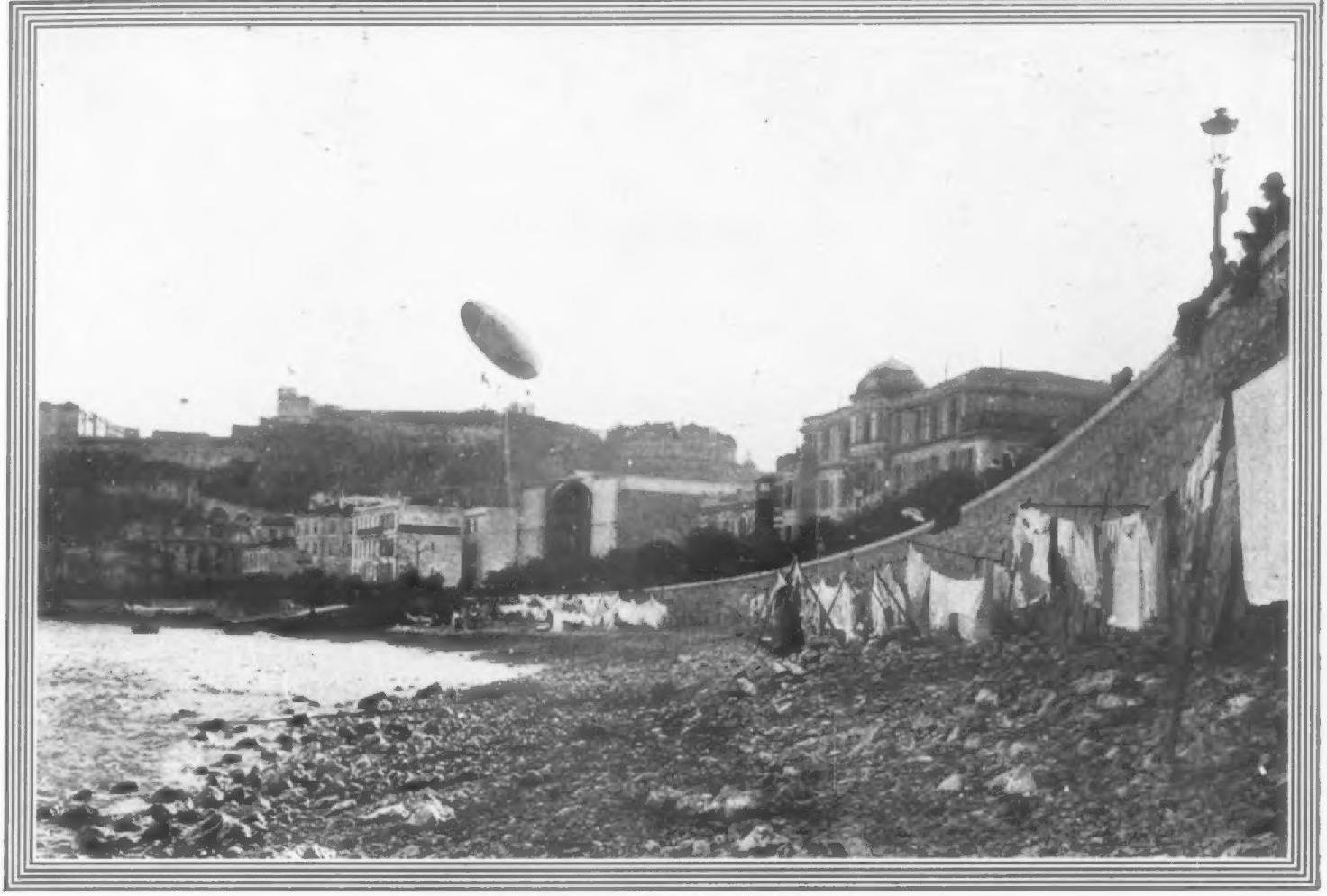
The airship approaching with the sea wall just below.

The first flight took place on January 28, 1902, with Santos-Dumont, who almost fell into the sea on takeoff, entered Monaco Bay and then returned to the Aerodrome at high speed, having stayed between 32 and 164 feet from the sea during the whole process. The first experiment soon pointed out the shortcomings of the landing mode: due to the sea wall, the crew responsible for helping the airship land was in a difficult situation due to the height of the obstruction. So it was proposed to place a landing platform just above this area. Despite this, Santos-Dumont was able to approach the sea-wall, turn off the engine, and enter with the natural thrust of the airship over the crowd watching the flight. The flight was 30 minutes long and about six thousand people watched the experiment.

=== 2nd flight ===
The same afternoon a second flight took place that more than signaled the difficulties of landing and after the Prince proposed to knock down the sea-wall, this time Santos-Dumont proposed to create a landing platform, which was accomplished after twelve days of work and during construction occurred one of the rare public appearances of Empress Eugénie, widow of Napoleon III. The second flight lasted 45 minutes and Prince Albert I recognized the risk of the airship maneuvering so close to the city, due to the chance of a wind hurling it against houses.

=== 3rd flight ===
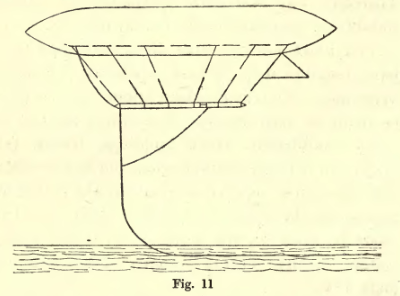
Schematic showing the position of the guide-rope on water.

The third flight took place on February 10, 1902, where they soon noticed the ease in launching that the platform offered. The airship took off with ease and was soon heading for the ocean, with the maritime guide-rope being dragged in the water as a stabilizer and staying within 164 feet meters of the ocean. The flight lasted about one hour.

The distance Santos-Dumont traveled during these experiments was greater than when he circumnavigated the Eiffel Tower, as well as being able to face high-speed winds.

=== 4th flight ===
The fourth flight occurred on February 12, 1902, reaching the greatest distance from the Aerodrome, for Santos-Dumont planned to fly to Italy. The airship was chased by the Prince of Monaco's yacht "Princesse Alice" and, on the coast, Clarence Grey Dinsmore and Isidore Kahenstein, chased the airship in their cars And they only managed to match the airship speed by putting themselves into high gear.

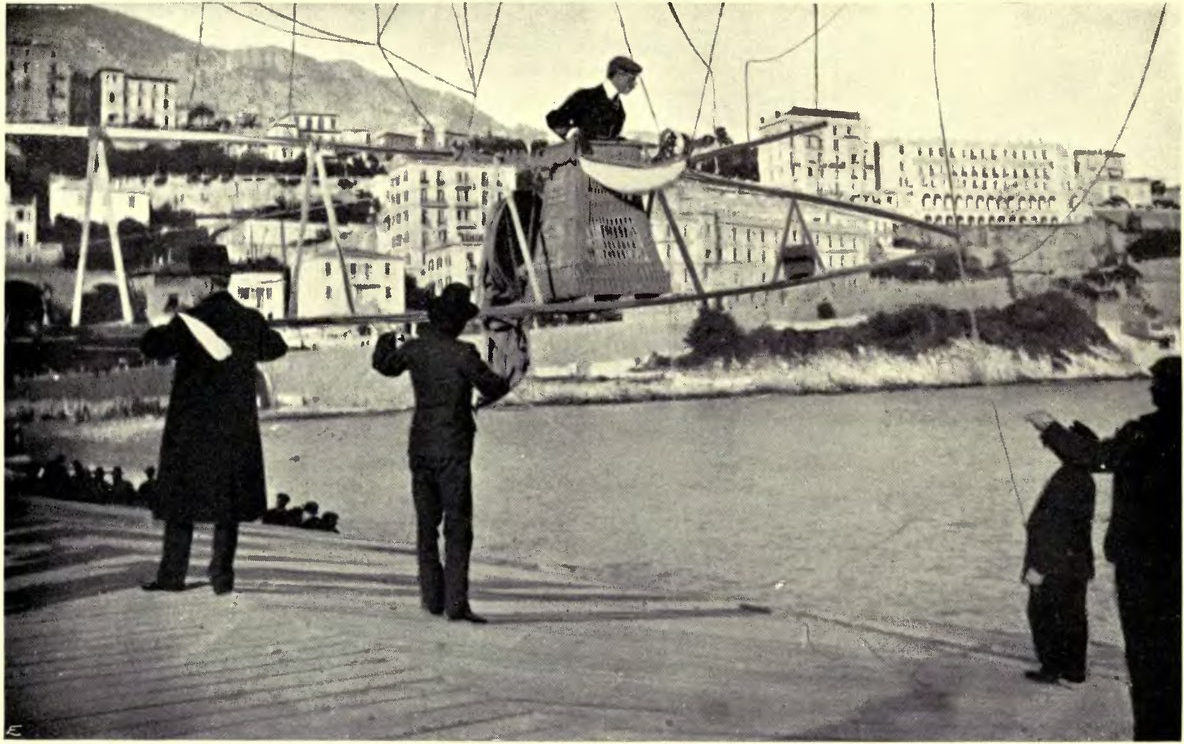
Santos-Dumont in his airship on February 12.

The airship, despite facing headwinds, soon crossed 1 kilometer in less than five minutes, thus being completely isolated. Then the wind increased, the rain started, which led Santos-Dumont to turn around and, aided by the wind in his favor, return to the Bay of Monaco. Half an hour after landing, a storm began. The Prince of Monaco suffered a concussion while trying to grab the guide-rope on his boat during the landing stage and the shock, when they finally managed to grab hold, caused some piano wire, which was used in the airship's structure, to break. Despite the accident, Albert I continued to support Santos-Dumont's experiments.

The main risk on this flight, something the aviator only recognized later, was due to the ship responsible for towing him: due to the heated smoke with reddish sparks coming out of the chimney and reaching the envelope, there was a risk of a lethal explosion.

=== Final flight ===
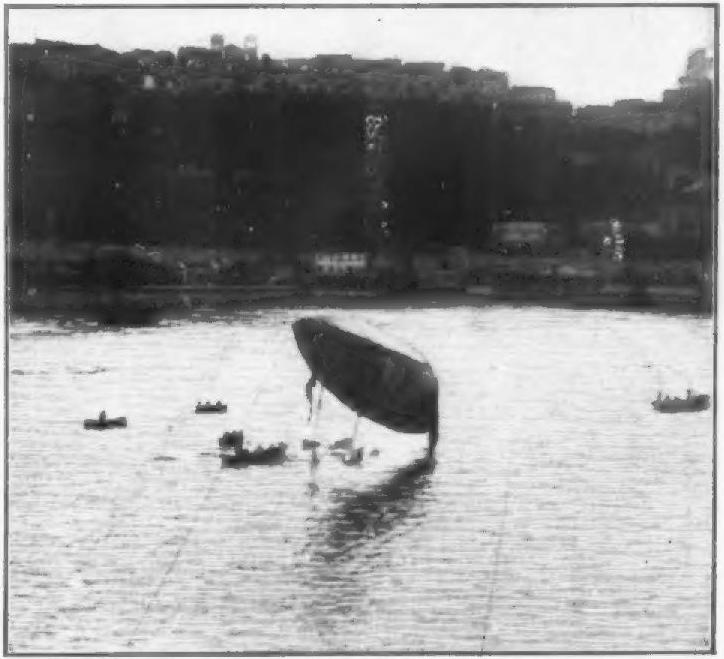
The airship falling into the water.

The last flight took place on February 14, 1902. The airship left its Aerodrome in the afternoon of the same day, aiming to cross the Mediterranean Sea, being escorted by the ships "Princesse Alice" and "Varuna".

Due to the fact that it was not perfectly inflated, due to what he described as negligence, the airship did not behave well right from the start. Noticing the lack of ascensional force, Santos-Dumont began to drop ballast to compensate and started to increase the steepness of the airship, hoping that the engine would also compensate for the lack of ascensional force. However, a cloud stopped blocking the Sun, whose rays caused the hydrogen gas to expand and increase the ascensional force, exaggerating the inclination that the aviator had made. Due to the unbalance and the weight of the cape, the airship rose violently and unbalanced, for a moment becoming totally perpendicular after a gust of wind coming from Tête de Chien struck it.

With the airship unbalanced and the risk of explosion due to engine operation, whose propellers were destroying the structure Santos-Dumont aborted the flight opening the valve and gradually falling into the sea, although it initially looked as if it would fall on a stony area near the Tir aux Pigeons field. He did not leave the airship until he was submerged up to his neck. Only then he climbed aboard the "Princesse Alice" and began to direct the rescue of the equipment. The envelope still with gas even burst during the rescue process and the engine was later rescued by divers.

== Aftermath ==
No. 6's equipment was rescued from the sea and sent for repairs in Paris, despite the creation of a fund to finance the repairs in Monaco, something that the aviator refused. With No. 7 then under construction, the experiments were interrupted and Santos-Dumont returned to Paris. Many experts even proposed that Santos-Dumont take a co-pilot, but at the time there was no one with enough experience to accompany him. After the accident, Santos-Dumont started to perform the checklist before each flight and recognizing that a water landing was no guarantee that the airship would not be destroyed, he returned his experiments to dry land.

After the events in Monaco, the No. 6 was displayed at The Crystal Palace, and Santos-Dumont even planned flights to England, but the casing was damaged after some time, something that Santos-Dumont considered to be an act of sabotage.

== Sources ==
- Barros, Henrique Lins de (2003). "Santos Dumont: o vôo que mudou a história da aviação". Parcerias Estratégicas (in Brazilian Portuguese). 8 (17): 303–341. Archived from the original on 2021-09-03.
- Barros, Henrique Lins de (2021). Santos Dumont: Um pioneiro da segurança de voo e dos ensaios em voo (PDF) (in Brazilian Portuguese). p. 11. Archived from the original (PDF) on 2021-07-20.
- Barros, Henrique Lins de; Souza, Renato Vilela Oliveira de (2011). "Santos-Dumont e a solução do voo dirigido: releituras e interpretações da imagem pública de um inventor". Revista Brasileira de História da Ciência (in Brazilian Portuguese). 4 (2). Rio de Janeiro: 239–256. doi:10.53727/rbhc.v4i2.322. S2CID 244679091. Archived from the original on 2019-08-11.
- Barros, Henrique Lins (2006). "Alberto Santos-Dumont: pioneiro da aviação". Exacta (in Brazilian Portuguese). 4 (1). São Paulo: 35–46. doi:10.5585/exacta.v4i1.643. ISSN 1678-5428. Archived from the original on 2021-09-03.
- CENDOC, ed. (2021). E o mundo falava de Santos-Dumont... (PDF) (in Brazilian Portuguese). Rio de Janeiro. p. 104. ISBN 978-65-994256-0-8. Archived (PDF) from the original on 2022-03-01.
- CENDOC, ed. (2023). E o Brasil falava de Santos-Dumont... (PDF). Rio de Janeiro. p. 120. ISBN 978-85-53019-53-3. Archived (PDF) from the original on 2023-07-24.
- Dias, Adriano Batista (2006). Santos Dumont: O Inovador (in Brazilian Portuguese) (1 ed.). Vieira Lent. p. 160. ISBN 85-88782-35-9. Archived (PDF) from the original on 2022-12-11.
- Heilig, Sterling (1902). "The over-sea experiments of Santos-Dumont". McClure's Magazine. Vol. 19, no. 3. pp. 195–206.
- Jorge, Fernando (2018). As Lutas, a Glória e o Martírio de Santos Dumont (1 ed.). Rio de Janeiro: Harper Collins. p. 512. ISBN 978-85-9508-271-7.
- Pereira, 1º Ten QOCon HIS Elaine Gonçalves da Costa (2022). Santos Dumont: Pai da Aviação (PDF) (in Brazilian Portuguese). Rio de Janeiro: INCAER. p. 50. Archived (PDF) from the original on 2023-05-13.
- Santos-Dumont, Alberto (1902). "How I Became an Aëronaut and My Experience with Air-Ships". McClure's Magazine. Vol. 19, no. 5. pp. 454–464.
- Hoffman, Paul (2003). Wings of Madness (1 ed.). Hyperion. p. 369. ISBN 0-7868-8571-8. OL 15444205M.
- Winters, Nancy (1998). Man flies. Eco Press. p. 160. ISBN 0-88-001-636-1. OL 356592M.
