= Beausoleil, Alpes-Maritimes =

Commune in Provence-Alpes-Côte d'Azur, France

Beausoleil Bèusoleu (Occitan)
- Commune
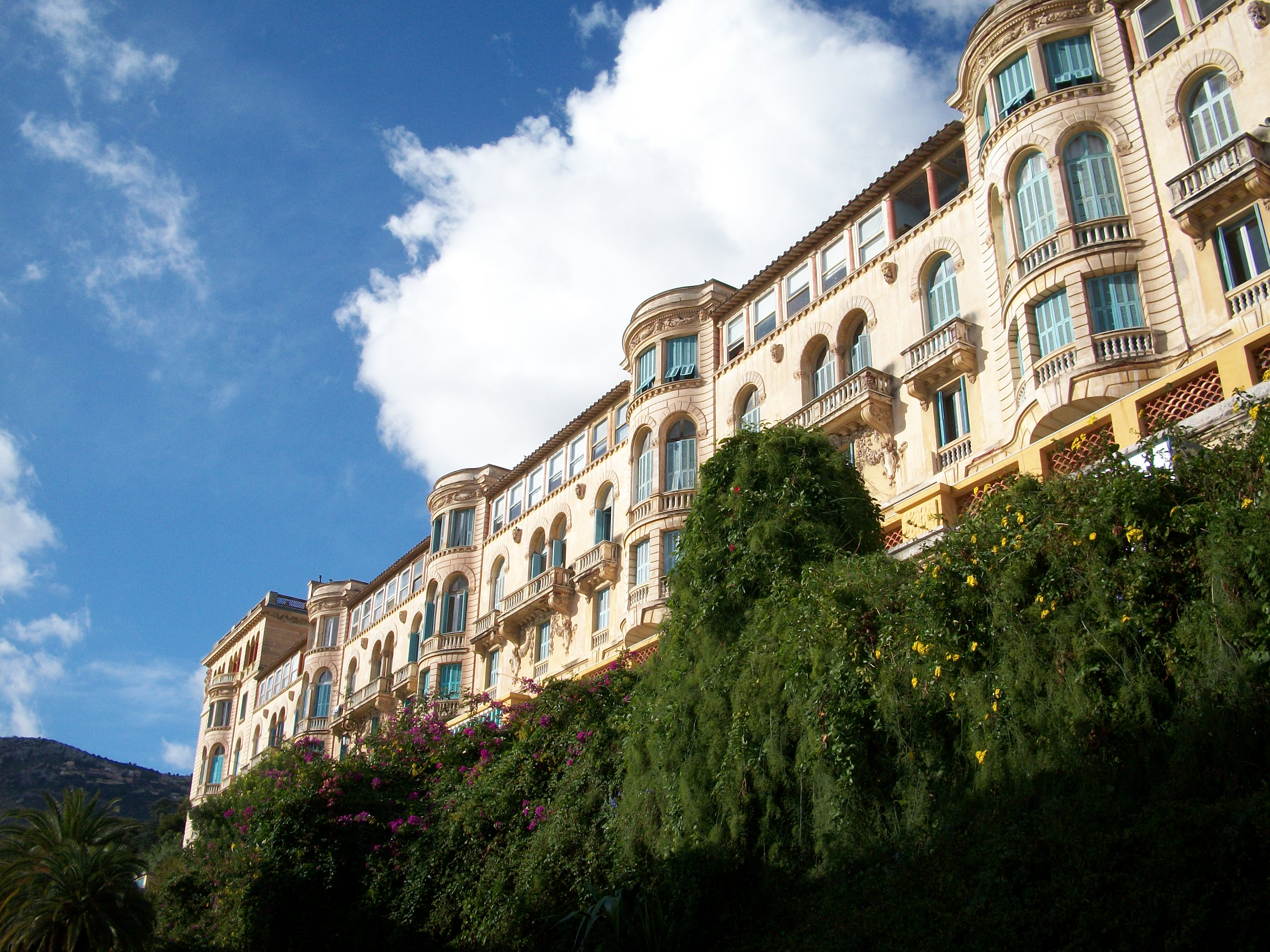
- Riviera Palace

- Coat of arms
- Location of Beausoleil
- Location within France Location within Provence-Alpes-Côte d'Azur
- Coordinates: 43°44′33″N 7°25′28″E
- Country: France
- Region: Provence-Alpes-Côte d'Azur
- Department: Alpes-Maritimes
- Arrondissement: Nice
- Canton: Beausoleil
- Intercommunality: CA Riviera Française

Government
  - Mayor (2026–32): Gérard Spinelli
- Area^{1}: 5.48 km^{2} (2.12 sq mi)
- Highest elevation: 621 m (2,037 ft)
- Lowest elevation: 40 m (130 ft)
- Population (2023): 11,936
  - Density: 2,180/km^{2} (5,640/sq mi)
- Time zone: UTC+01:00 (CET)
  - Summer (DST): UTC+02:00 (CEST)
- INSEE/Postal code: 06012 /06240
- ^{1} French Land Register data, which excludes lakes, ponds, glaciers > 1 km^{2} (0.386 sq mi or 247 acres) and river estuaries.

Beausoleil (French: [bosɔlɛj]; Occitan: Bèusoleu [ˌbɛwsuˈlew]; lit. 'Beautiful Sun') is a commune in the Alpes-Maritimes department in the Provence-Alpes-Côte d'Azur region in Southeastern France. It adjoins the Principality of Monaco to its south. The commune of Beausoleil was established in 1904; it was supposed to be named Monte-Carlo Supérieur (French: [mɔ̃t kaʁlɔ sypeʁjœʁ]; lit. 'Upper Monte Carlo') for a time but the idea was abandoned after protests from Monégasque authorities.

== Geography ==
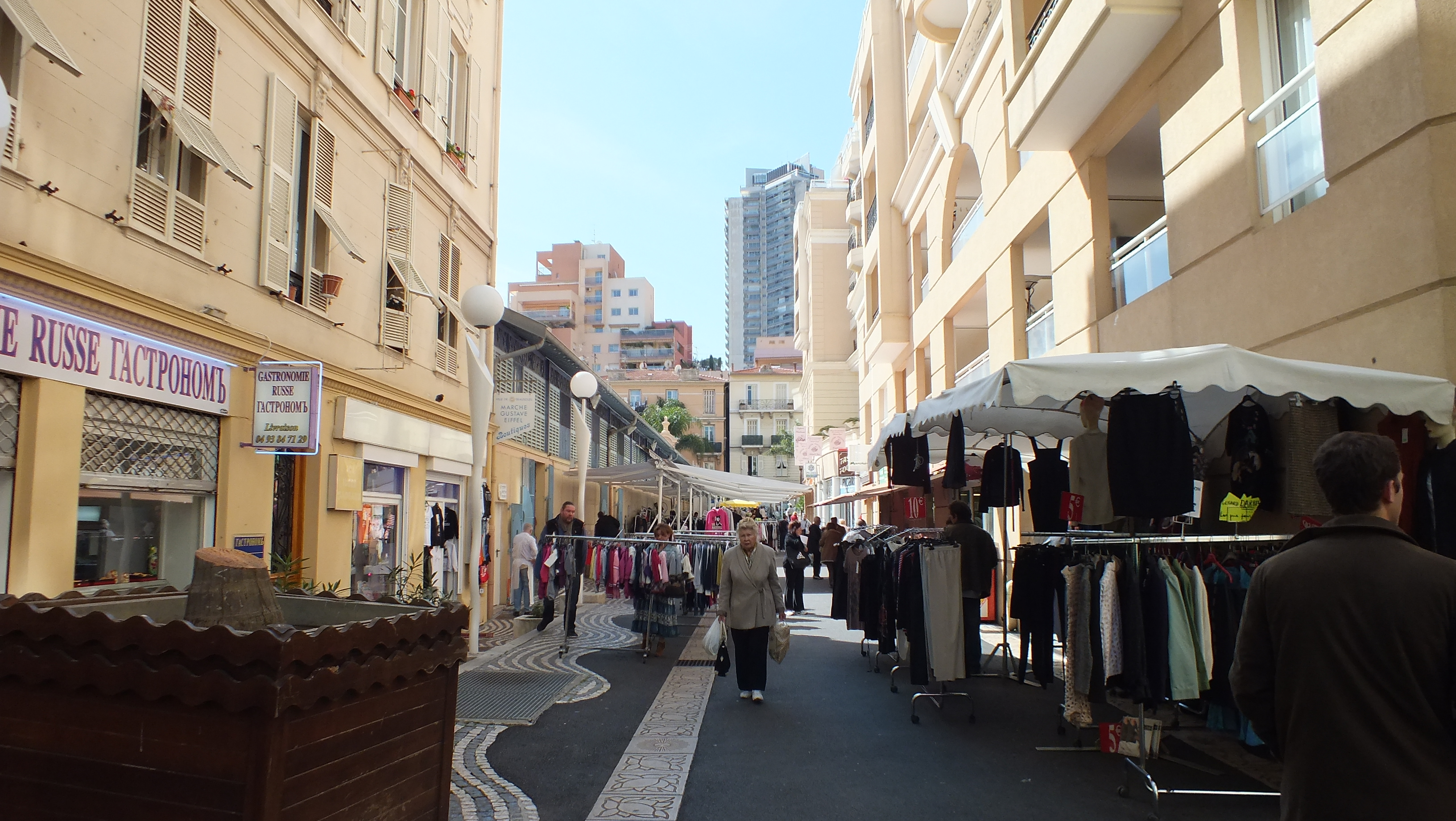
Place du Marché (Market Square)

Located on a hillside above the city-state of Monaco, Beausoleil is surrounded by the Tête de Chien and Agel mountains.

It is urbanistically contiguous with the principality and shares some streets where one side of the road is French and the other is Monégasque, such as the Boulevard de France, the Boulevard du Maréchal Leclerc, and the Avenue du Maréchal Foch. Its house and neighbourhood designs also blend in with those on the Monagasque side of the border, in effect forming a transborder agglomeration urban area with Monaco.

Its municipality borders with the Monégasque wards of Monte Carlo, Saint Roman, Saint Michel, Moneghetti and Les Révoires; and with the French municipalities of La Turbie, Roquebrune-Cap-Martin and Peille.

== Economy ==
The commune is intertwined with Monaco. It functions to some extent as a bedroom community as many of its residents are employed in Monaco. The main part of the town consists of Belle Époque houses with ornate entrances. Attractions within Beausoleil include the Gustave Eiffel covered market, St Joseph's Sanctuary (a church with ornate stained-glass windows) and the Fontdivina Fountain and Wash House.

== Politics ==
The town's border with Monaco was largely fixed during the 18th century. What is now known as Beausoleil was administered from La Turbie prior to 1904, when the town was incorporated. Along with other French communes adjacent to Monaco, the electorate has traditionally had a sizable proportion which is left-leaning: Roger Bennati, mayor of the town 1989–1995, served under Communist affiliation. Monaco's political parties are more right-leaning.

There have been no border controls on its border with Monaco since 1963.

=== Former mayors ===
Date	Name	Party
1904	Camille Blanc	
1929	Jacques Subles	
1935	Paul-Joseph Chiabault	
1941	François Rochesani	
1943	Arthur Audoly	
1944	Marius Floret	
1944	Auguste Dubar	
1953	Paul-Joseph Chiabault	
1971	Paul Massa	
1986	André Vanco	
1989	Roger Bennati	PCF
1995	Gérard Spinelli	UDF
2001	Robert Vial	Divers Gauche
2008	Gérard Spinelli	

== Demographics ==
Historical population
Year	Pop.	±% p.a.
1968	14,144	—
1975	12,208	−2.08%
1982	11,664	−0.65%
1990	12,326	+0.69%
1999	12,775	+0.40%
2007	13,879	+1.04%
2012	13,272	−0.89%
2017	13,607	+0.50%
2023	11,936	−2.16%
Source: INSEE

== Education ==
Schools in Beausoleil:

- Groupe Paul Doumer et Jean Jaurès (preschool/nursery and elementary school in two campuses)
- Groupe Les Cigales (preschool/nursery and elementary school)
- Groupe Les Copains (preschool/nursery and elementary school)
- École du Ténao (preschool/nursery and elementary school)
- Collège Bellevue (junior high school)

== Transport ==
The train station Gare de Monaco-Monte-Carlo is located on the border between Beausoleil and Monaco.

A small portion of the A8 autoroute passes through the northern parts of the commune.

== See also ==
- Communes of the Alpes-Maritimes department
