= La Turbie =

Commune in Provence-Alpes-Côte d'Azur, France

La Turbie A Torbia (Occitan)
- Commune
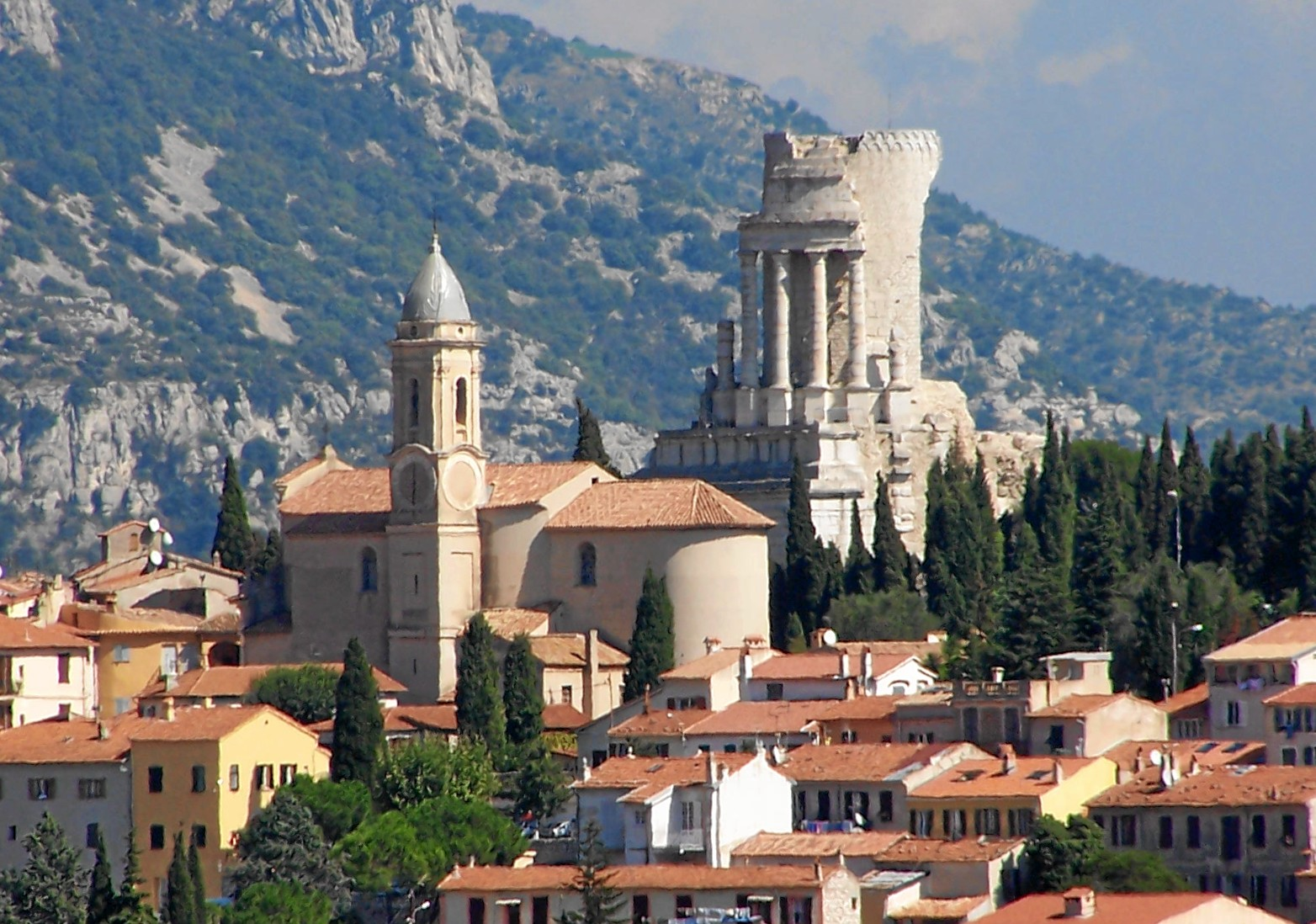
- The church of La Turbie and the Tropaeum Alpium

- Coat of arms
- Location of La Turbie
- Location within France Location within Provence-Alpes-Côte d'Azur
- Coordinates: 43°44′47″N 7°24′06″E
- Country: France
- Region: Provence-Alpes-Côte d'Azur
- Department: Alpes-Maritimes
- Arrondissement: Nice
- Canton: Beausoleil
- Intercommunality: CA de la Riviera Française

Government
  - Mayor (2026–32): Valentin Lopez
- Area^{1}: 7.42 km^{2} (2.86 sq mi)
- Highest elevation: 658 m (2,159 ft)
- Lowest elevation: 146 m (479 ft)
- Population (2023): 3,045
  - Density: 410/km^{2} (1,060/sq mi)
- Demonym: Turbiasques
- Time zone: UTC+01:00 (CET)
  - Summer (DST): UTC+02:00 (CEST)
- INSEE/Postal code: 06150 /06320
- Website: www.ville-la-turbie.fr
- ^{1} French Land Register data, which excludes lakes, ponds, glaciers > 1 km^{2} (0.386 sq mi or 247 acres) and river estuaries.

La Turbie (French pronunciation: [la tyʁbi]; Occitan: A Torbia; Italian: Turbia, formerly) is a commune in the Alpes-Maritimes department in Southeastern France. It borders the Principality of Monaco, which is southeast of it. Albert II, Prince of Monaco owns a secondary residence in La Turbie.

== History ==
On the Via Julia Augusta, La Turbie was famous in Roman times for the large monument, the Trophy of Augustus, that Augustus made to celebrate his victory over the Ligurian tribes of the area.

During the Middle Ages, the village (called then Turbia) was mainly under the dominion of the Republic of Genoa. Dante wrote in his Divina Commedia that Turbia was the western limit of the Italian Liguria.

It was alternatively part of Savoy or the Principality of Monaco, from where the population of Turbia has assimilated the dialect Monegasque, even if the local Ligurian dialect has maintained some characteristics of the nearby Niçois of Nice. Actually the local dialect is nearly extinct, mainly after the 1860 inclusion of the Sardinian County of Nice in France.

La Turbie is the cradle of automobile mountain races. On 31 January 1897, the last stage of the Marseilles-Nice race was a 17 km hillclimb between Nice and La Turbie; André Michelin, at the wheel of a De Dion powered by a steam engine, won the race at the incredible average speed of 31.8 km per h. On 30 March 1900, German driver Wilhelm Bauer crashed and died, being the first driver killed during a hillclimb speed event. On 1 April 1903, William Eliot Morris Zborowski, Count de Montsaulvain, died at the wheel of his Mercedes nearly at the same place as Bauer. As reported in The New York Times, 2 April 1903, the French Minister of the Interior ordered the prefect of Alpes-Maritimes to "stop the further use of the Nice-La Turbie course for automobiles." The race organizer, the Nice Automobile Club, obtained the lift of the ban in 1909 and the race resumed.

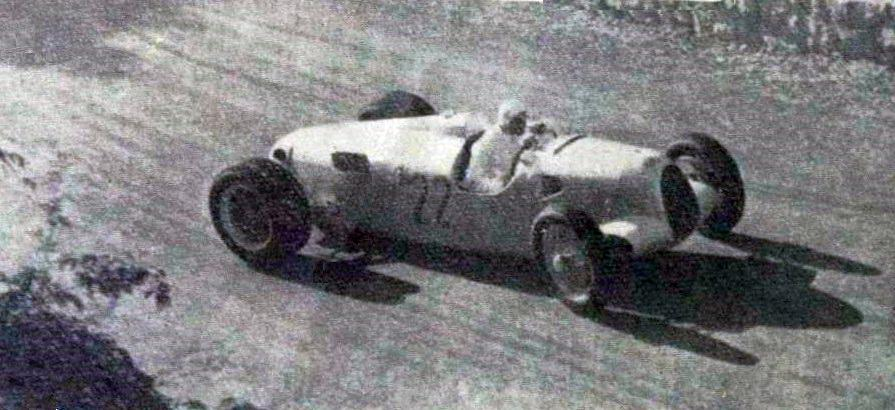
Hans Stuck winning the 1938 La Turbie event with a double rear wheel Auto Union Type C

From 1968 to 1995, nearly the same route was used for the last stage of the cyclist race Paris-Nice (excepting 1977). This time trial often decided the final winner of Paris-Nice. In 1972, Raymond Poulidor defeated Eddy Merckx, who had defeated Jacques Anquetil three years before. Sean Kelly, seven-time winner of Paris-Nice (1981-1988), won the La Turbie hillclimb five times.

On 13 September 1982, Princess Grace de Monaco was killed in a car accident at Cap-d'Ail, near La Turbie, but on a road called "Route de la Turbie".

The commune formerly included the communes of Beausoleil and Cap-d'Ail, which was disestablished at the beginning of the 20th century. Only the old main town, around the remaining structure of the Roman Trophy of Augustus, forms the current commune.

== Geography ==
The boundaries of La Turbie were formerly more extensive and included the territory now contained in the town of Beausoleil, formerly known as Haut-Monte-Carlo, owing to its proximity to Monaco. The commune of La Turbie retains a smaller, common boundary with part of the Principality.

La Turbie can be reached either from Cap-d'Ail on the coast or the Grand Corniche. Within the town is the Trophy of Augustus, also known as the Trophée des Alpes.

== Sights ==
A limestone outcrop above La Turbie is called the Tête de Chien ("head of dog"), a folk etymology deriving from its former name, Testa de camp ("head of (military) camp").

La Turbie is built, partly, with old stones recovered from the ruins of the Trophy of the Alpes (Trophy of Augustus), a Roman monument built by the Emperor Augustus to celebrate his victory over the Ligurian tribes which lived in the mountains of the area and attacked the merchants plying the Roman trade routes.

The association football club AS Monaco FC have their training ground in La Turbie since 1981. The training center is located in an old quarry and has 2 natural grass pitches as well as an artificial turf "small pitch".

== Population ==
Historical population
Year	Pop.	±% p.a.
1968	1,761	—
1975	1,826	+0.52%
1982	1,969	+1.08%
1990	2,609	+3.58%
1999	3,021	+1.64%
2007	3,160	+0.56%
2012	3,179	+0.12%
2017	3,063	−0.74%
2023	3,045	−0.10%
Source: INSEE

== Twin town ==
La Turbie is twinned with:

- Sarre, Aosta Valley, Italy

== Personalities ==
- Albert II, Prince of Monaco owns a 56-acres estate, Roc Agel, on the slopes of Mont Agel.
- Rudolf Nureyev had a residence in La Turbie until 1993.

== In pop culture ==
La Turbie was one of the locations where the 1998 film Ronin was filmed. La Turbie also featured as a location in the 1943 novel "Biggles Fails to Return" by author Captain W.E. Johns.

== See also ==
- Communes of the Alpes-Maritimes department
