= Municipality of Monaco =

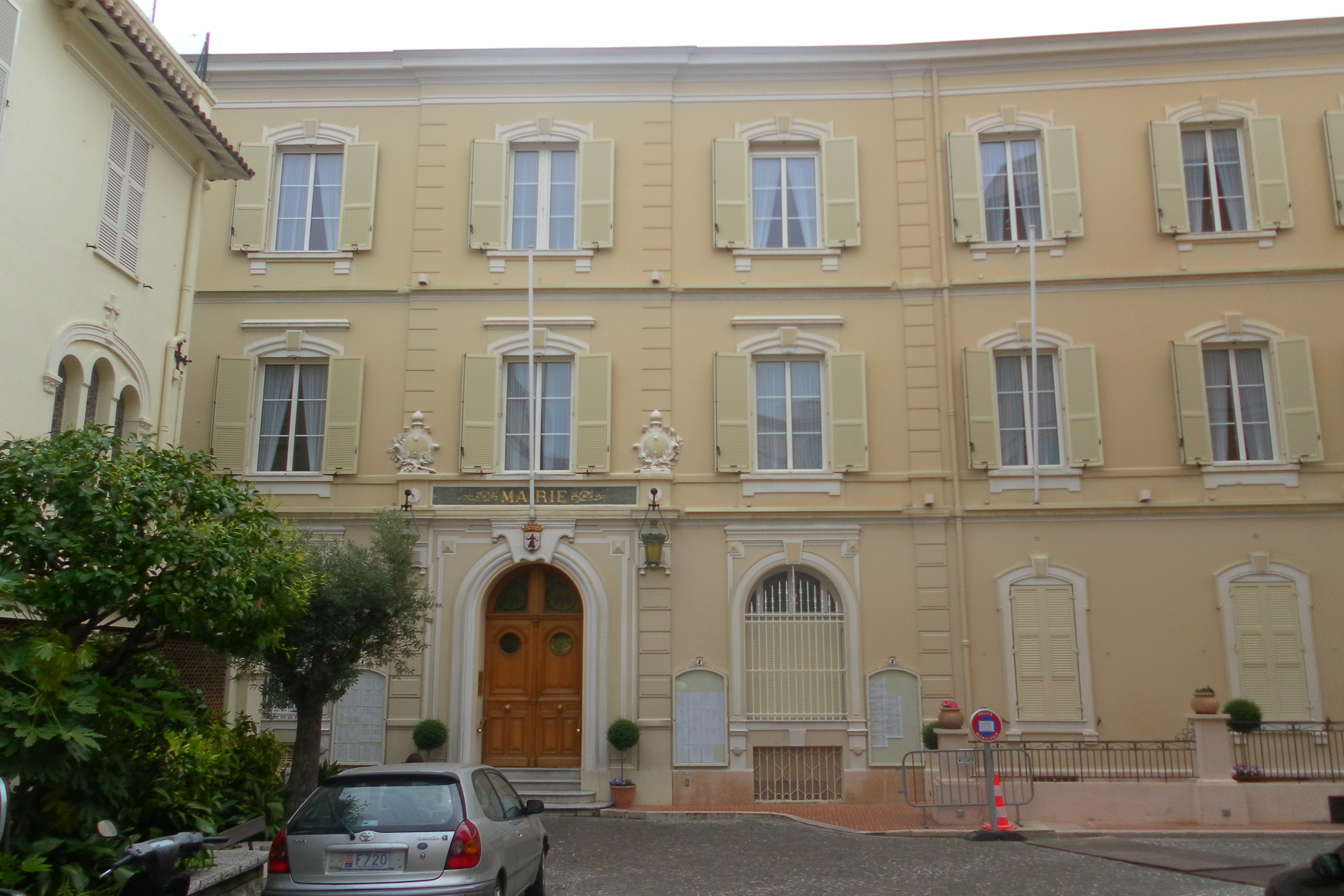
- Town hall of the Municipality of Monaco

- Flag Coat of arms

- Coordinates: 43°43′52.48″N 7°25′11.08″E
- Country: Monaco (city-state)

Government
  - Type: Municipality
  - Mayor: Georges Marsan

Area
  - Land: 2 km^{2} (0.77 sq mi)
- Elevation: 10 m (33 ft)

Population
  - Total: 32,020
- Postcode: 98000

The Municipality of Monaco (French: Commune de Monaco; Monégasque: Cumüna de Mùnegu) is the only administrative division of the Principality of Monaco, and is coterminous with the state as a whole. It only borders France and it is in Europe.

== Administration ==
The municipality is administered in accordance with Part IX (9) of the Constitution of Monaco. The municipality has a communal council made up of 15 members, who can also hold a seat on the National Council.

The minimum age for members of the Communal Council is 21. A little more than 7,000 Monegasque citizens are voters. The electoral system is a simple two-year plurinominal election: each voter has fifteen votes of preference that they can distribute among the competing lists. If a candidate gains more than half the votes in the first round, they are elected. Otherwise, they go to a second round in which the remaining seats are filled in order of vote numbers. The effect of this mechanism is hyper-major, resulting in a Communal Council by the dominant party of the principality, the Union Monégasque. The term of office is 4 years.

The council elects the mayor of Monaco and the mayor's deputies from its ranks and his deputies. The political custom, however, is that the candidate heading the list which gained the most votes is elected mayor. The current mayor is Georges Marsan, who has been in office since 2003 and has won a third re-election.

The functions of the municipality, active in social, cultural and civil life, do not differ substantially from those of the equivalent bodies in Monaco's neighbouring countries, such as the communes of France and comune of Italy.

== History ==
The ancient territory of the Principality was much larger than the present one, including also the towns of Roccabruna and Menton which, however, arose in the framework of the Italian Risorgimento, passed to France in 1860 leaving the capital, i.e. the Monegasque municipality, as the only commune of the State.

The 1911 constitution divided the old Commune of Monaco into the three municipalities — Monaco City, Monte Carlo and La Condamine — but the prince's government was accused of weakening one of the only democratic institutions in the country; at the time the National Council had extremely limited powers. Because of the controversy, the unified municipality was restored in a 1917 law which took effect the following year. Since then, Monegasque territory has been administratively undivided, and the city districts have only had statistical purposes.

Today, the city hall of Monaco is based in place de la Mairie.

== Quarters ==
Ward	Area (km^{2})	Population (Census of 2008)	Density (km^{2})	City Blocks (îlots)	Remarks
Former municipality of Monaco
Monaco-Ville	0.19	1,034	5,442	19	Old City
Former municipality of Monte Carlo
Monte Carlo/Spélugues (Bd. Des Moulins-Av. de la Madone)	0.30	3,834	12,780	20	Casino and resort area
La Rousse/Saint Roman (Annonciade-Château Périgord)	0.13	3,223	24,792	17	Northeast area, includes Le Ténao
Larvotto/Bas Moulins (Larvotto-Bd Psse Grace)	0.34	5,443	16,009	17	Eastern beach area
Saint Michel (Psse Charlotte-Park Palace)	0.16	3,907	24,419	24	Central residential area
Former municipality of La Condamine
La Condamine	0.28	3,947	14,096	28	Northwest port area
La Colle (Plati-Pasteur-Bd Charles III)	0.11	2,829	25,718	15	On the western border with Cap d'Ail
Les Révoires (Hector Otto-Honoré Labande)	0.09	2,545	28,278	11	Contains the Jardin Exotique de Monaco
Moneghetti/Bd de Belgique (Bd Rainier III-Bd de Belgique)	0.10	3,003	30,030	17	Central-north residential area
New land reclaimed from the sea
Fontvieille	0.35	3,901	11,146	10	Started 1981
Monaco	2.05	33,666	16,422	178	
^{(1)}Not included in the total, as it is only proposed

== Twin towns and sister cities ==
The Municipality of Monaco is twinned with:

- Ostend, Belgium (1958)
- Lucciana, France (2009)
- Dolceacqua, Italy (2023)
