= Ingo Böbel =

German political scientist and economist (1947–2020)

- Born: 1947
- Died: 2020 (aged 72–73)
- Education: University of Erlangen–Nuremberg
- Scientific career
- Fields: Economy
- Workplaces: International University of Monaco

Ingo Böbel (1947–2020) was a German political scientist and economist. He was board member of the Bundesliga football team 1. FC Nürnberg. In 1994, he was sentenced to prison for fraud and tax evasion. He was Professor of Economics at the International University of Monaco from 2000 until his death in 2020.

== Biography ==
Ingo Böbel received a Ph.D. in political science from the University of Erlangen-Nuremberg and was habilitated there. He received a Leverhulme European Research Fellowship from Leverhulme Trust in 1978 and became a research fellow at Newcastle University, before becoming a visiting associate professor of economics at Rutgers Business School – Newark and New Brunswick in 1980. He became an associate professor of economics at Rutgers Business School in 1983.

He was a founding member of the European Association for Research in Industrial Economics and the International Joseph A. Schumpeter Society.

In 1986, he became treasurer of the 1. FC Nürnberg football team, and was a member of its board of directors. In 1991, Peter Kargs, former treasurer for the team, published an open letter which brought attention to financial irregularities of Böbel's book-keeping. Before the scandal, Böbel had been praised for his "clean book keeping" by the German Football Association.

Böbel resigned from his position as treasurer and was investigated by the Nuremberg-Fürth public prosecutor's office. It was found that as treasurer he had organized illegal earnings, diverted funds past the bookkeeping and used it to pay for football players' personal expenses such as private air travel to Monaco and Venice. In 1994, Böbel was sentenced to three years and six months in prison for embezzlement of club funds amounting to DM 700,000 and for tax evasion of DM 675,000.

In 2000, he became a professor at the private International University of Monaco. In 2007 he became a visiting professor at SCQM Shanghai Jiao Tong University, in the People's Republic of China, and taught the microeconomics of competitiveness programme at Harvard Business School.

In 2012, he was named to The Economist's list for the Business Professor of the Year Award. In 2013, the Financial Times reported on Böbel as "Professor of the Week".

Böbel died in March 2020.
