= Canton of Beausoleil =

Coordinates: 43.75°N 7.42°E

- Canton
- Situation of the canton of Beausoleil in the department of Alpes-Maritimes
- Country: France
- Region: Provence-Alpes-Côte d'Azur
- Department: Alpes-Maritimes
- No. of communes: {{{nbcomm}}}
- Population (2023): 32,020
- INSEE code: 0604

The canton of Beausoleil is an administrative division of the Alpes-Maritimes department, southeastern France. Its borders were modified at the French canton reorganisation which came into effect in March 2015. Its seat is in Beausoleil.

It consists of the following communes:

1. Beaulieu-sur-Mer
2. Beausoleil
3. Cap-d'Ail
4. Èze
5. Saint-Jean-Cap-Ferrat
6. La Turbie
7. Villefranche-sur-Mer
