= Chemin des Révoires =

Highest point in Monaco

- Cami̍n d’ë Revëre
- Location within Monaco

Highest point
- Elevation: 162 m (531 ft)
- Prominence: 0 (slope point)
- Listing: Country high point
- Coordinates: 43°44′4.45″N 7°24′46.3″E

Geography
- Location: Monaco - France border
- Parent range: Maritime Alps

The Chemin des Révoires (Monégasque: Cami̍n d’ë Revëre) is a pathway within Les Révoires district of the Principality of Monaco. It is the highest point in Monaco.

== Features ==
The highest point in Monaco, at 162 metres (528 feet) above sea level, is situated on this pathway, on the slopes of Mont Agel, a mountain whose summit is situated on the French side. A proportion of the Principality's territory is very steep, being geographically part of the Alps which extend to the Mediterranean Sea.

== See also ==
- Geography of Monaco
