= Mont Agel =

Mountain on the border between France and Monaco

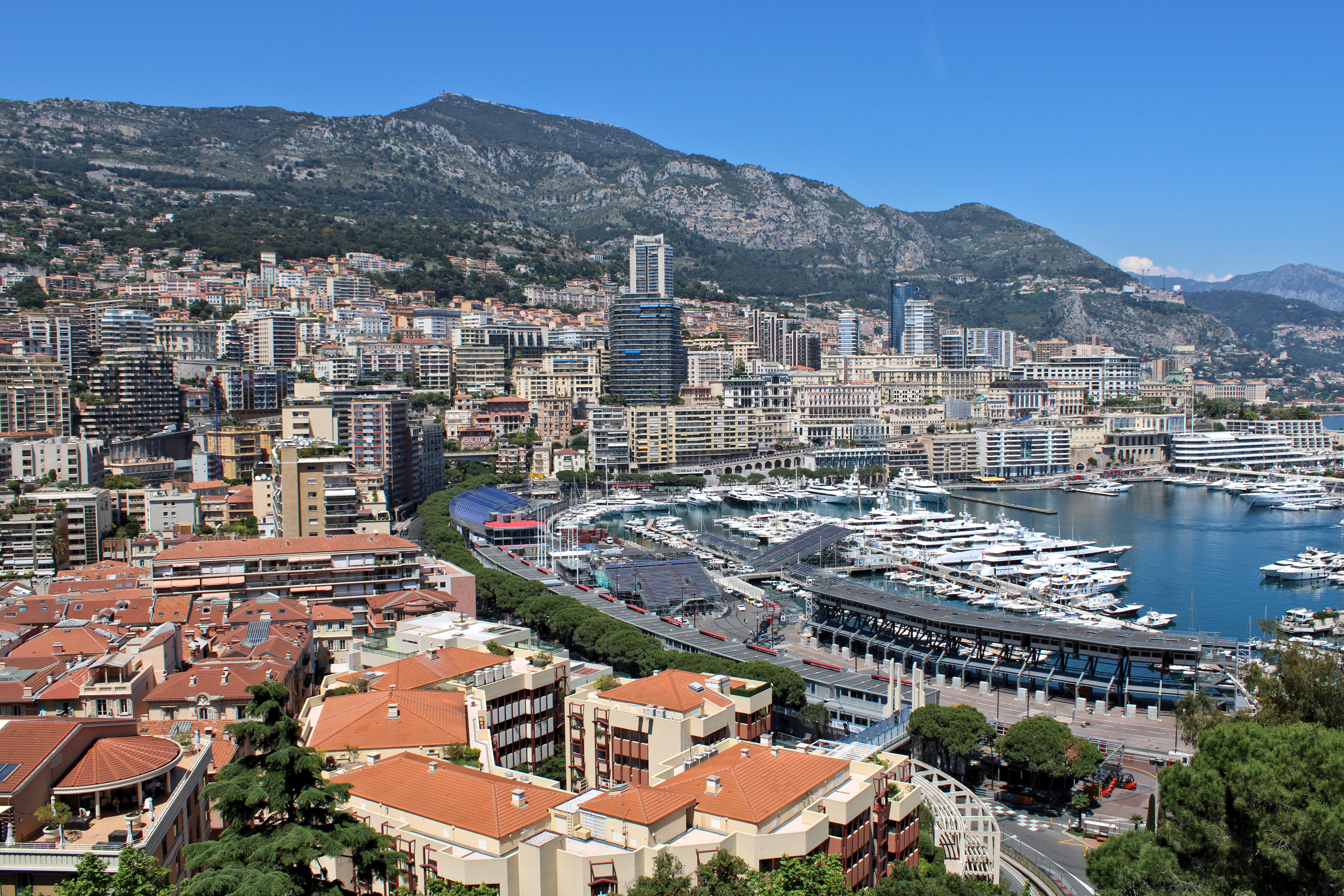
- View of Monaco with Mont Agel in the background

Highest point
- Elevation: 1,148 m (3,766 ft)
- Prominence: 210 m (690 ft)
- Coordinates: 43°46′31″N 7°25′35″E

Geography
- Location within France
- Location: Alpes-Maritimes, France / Monaco
- Parent range: Maritime Alps

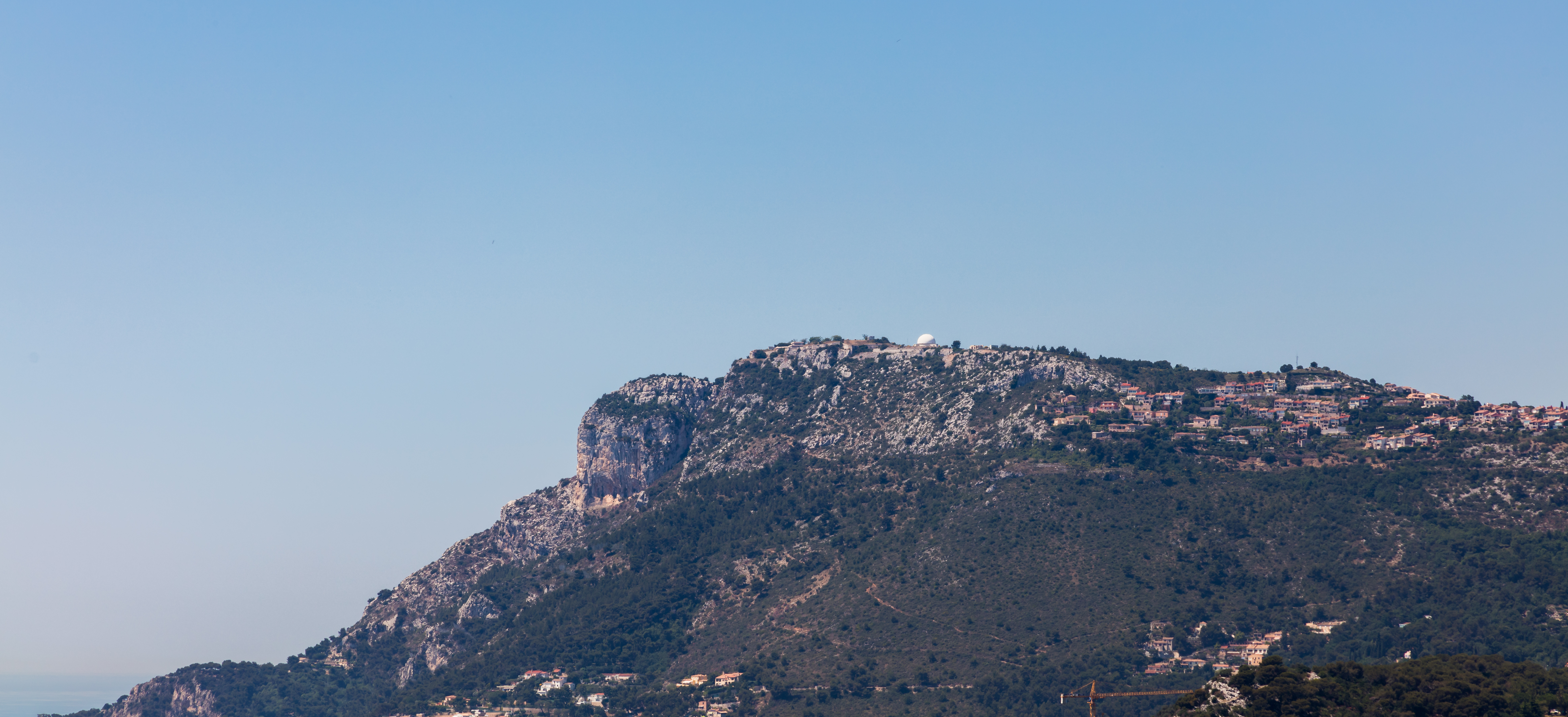
Tete de chien

Mont Agel is a mountain in the Maritime Alps on the border between France and Monaco. The summit of this mount, at 1,148 metres (3,766 ft) above sea level, is on the French side, but the highpoint of Monaco, lying on a pathway named Chemin des Révoires, is on its slopes, at an altitude of 161 metres (528 feet).

== History ==
The top of Mont Agel is occupied by Nice Air Base, itself built on the former Ouvrage Mont Agel of the Alpine Line fortifications.

On 18 June 2011, a light aircraft crashed onto Mont Agel, killing two British passengers. The plane was on a private flight, and was en route from Italy to Troyes at the time of the crash. Conditions were foggy.

Mont Agel is the site of the Monte Carlo Golf Club, formerly home of the Monte Carlo Open. The club celebrated its 100th anniversary in 2011.

Roc Agel, purchased by Rainier III, Prince of Monaco, as a summer family residence, is high on the slopes of Mont Agel.

== See also ==
- La Turbie
- Tête de Chien, another prominent mountain overlooking Monaco
- Geography of Monaco
- Geography of France
- List of countries by highest point
- List of highest paved roads in Europe
- List of mountain passes
