= Tête de Chien =

Rock promontory near the village of La Turbie, France

Coordinates: 43°43′49.68″N 7°24′10.17″E

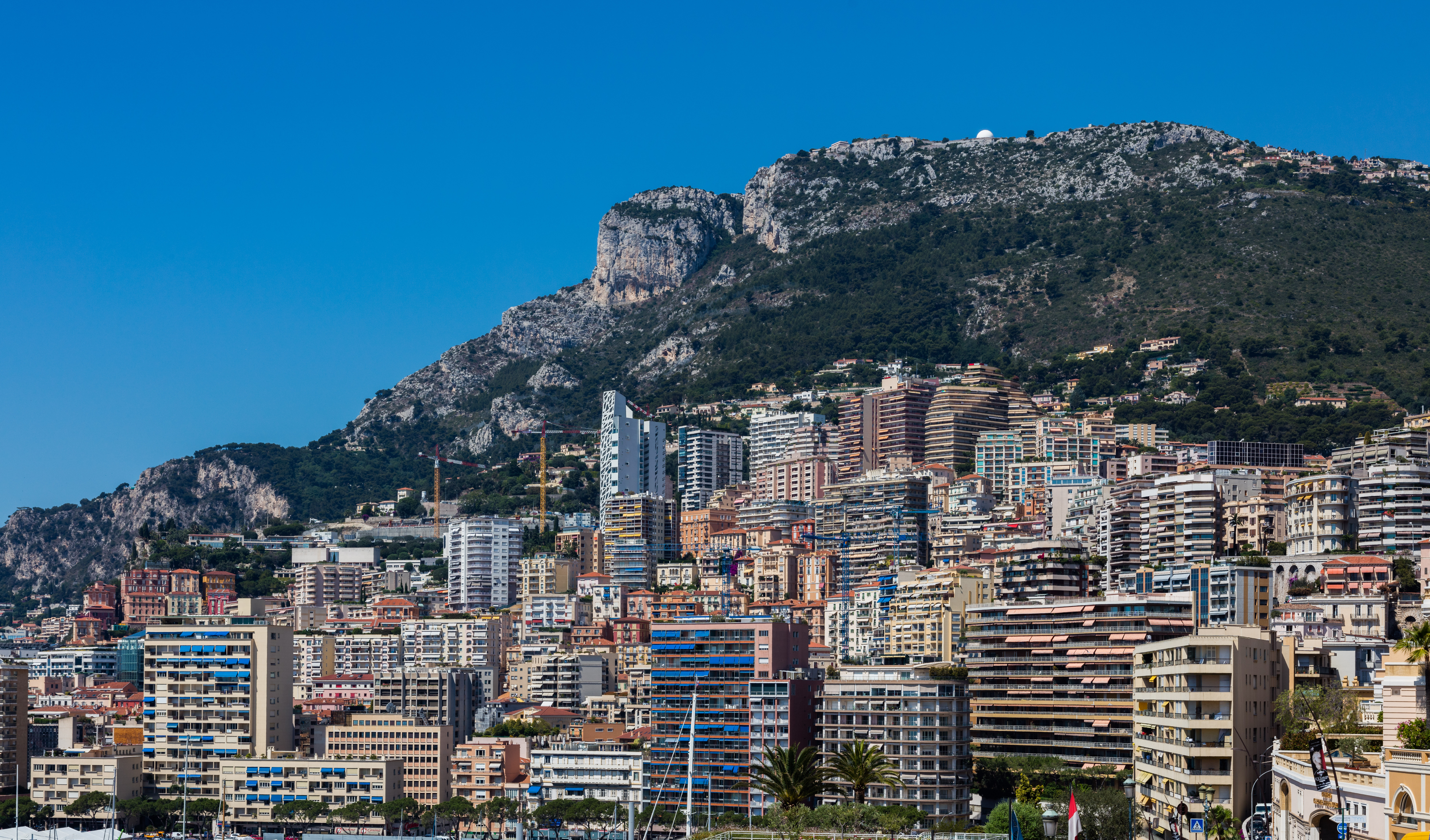
The Tête de Chien above Monaco

The Tête de Chien (Monégasque: Testa de Can; "Dog's Head") is a 550 m (1,804 ft) high rock promontory near the village of La Turbie in the Alpes-Maritimes department of France. It overlooks the Principality of Monaco, and is the highest point on the Grande Corniche road.

The American diplomat Samuel S. Cox, in his 1870 travel book Search for Winter Sunbeams in the Riviera, Corsica, Algiers and Spain wrote that the Tête de Chien more resembled a tortoise than a dog's head, and believed that Tête de Chien, or rather Testa de Can, was a corruption of Testa de Camp ("Field Head"), as it was where Caesar stationed his troops after the conquest of Gaul. Vere Herbert, the heroine of Ouida's 1880 novel Moths is described as living under the Tête de Chien, "...within a few miles of the brilliant Hell [Monaco]."

In 1897, Gustave Saige described it as "a vertical escarpment of circular shape which gives it a characteristic appearance; it's the Dog's Head."

In 1944, Leopold Bohm, a German defence company commander, was stationed on the Tête de Chien and saw a low flying airplane crash into the sea, which had been pursued by two other planes. Bohm's observation was on the day of the disappearance of the aviator Antoine de Saint-Exupéry, and it has been speculated that Bohm saw the final flight of Saint-Exupéry.

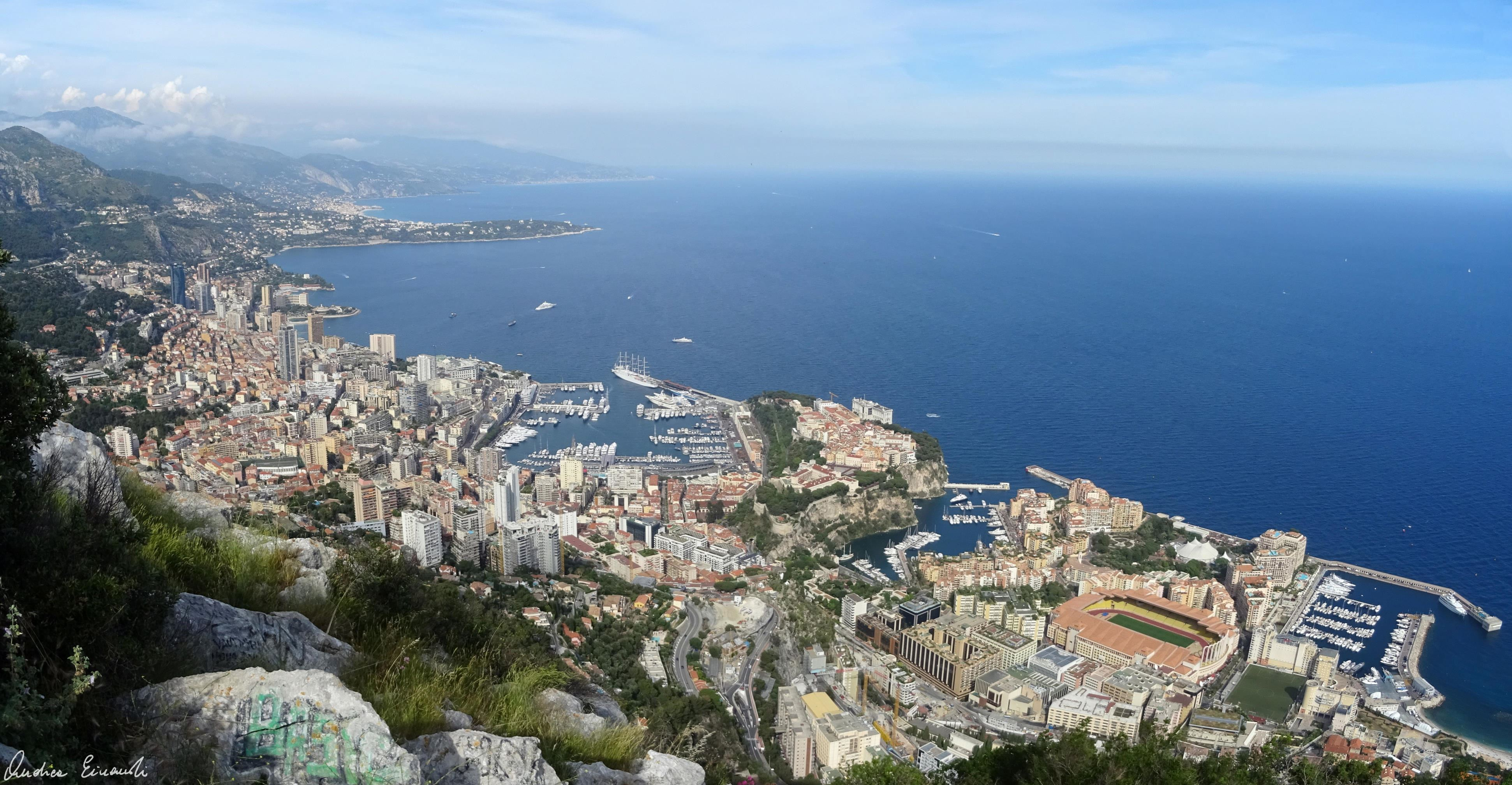
The Principality of Monaco as seen from Tête de Chien
