= Cap-d'Ail =

Commune in Provence-Alpes-Côte d'Azur, France

Cap-d'Ail Caup d'Alh (Occitan)
- Commune
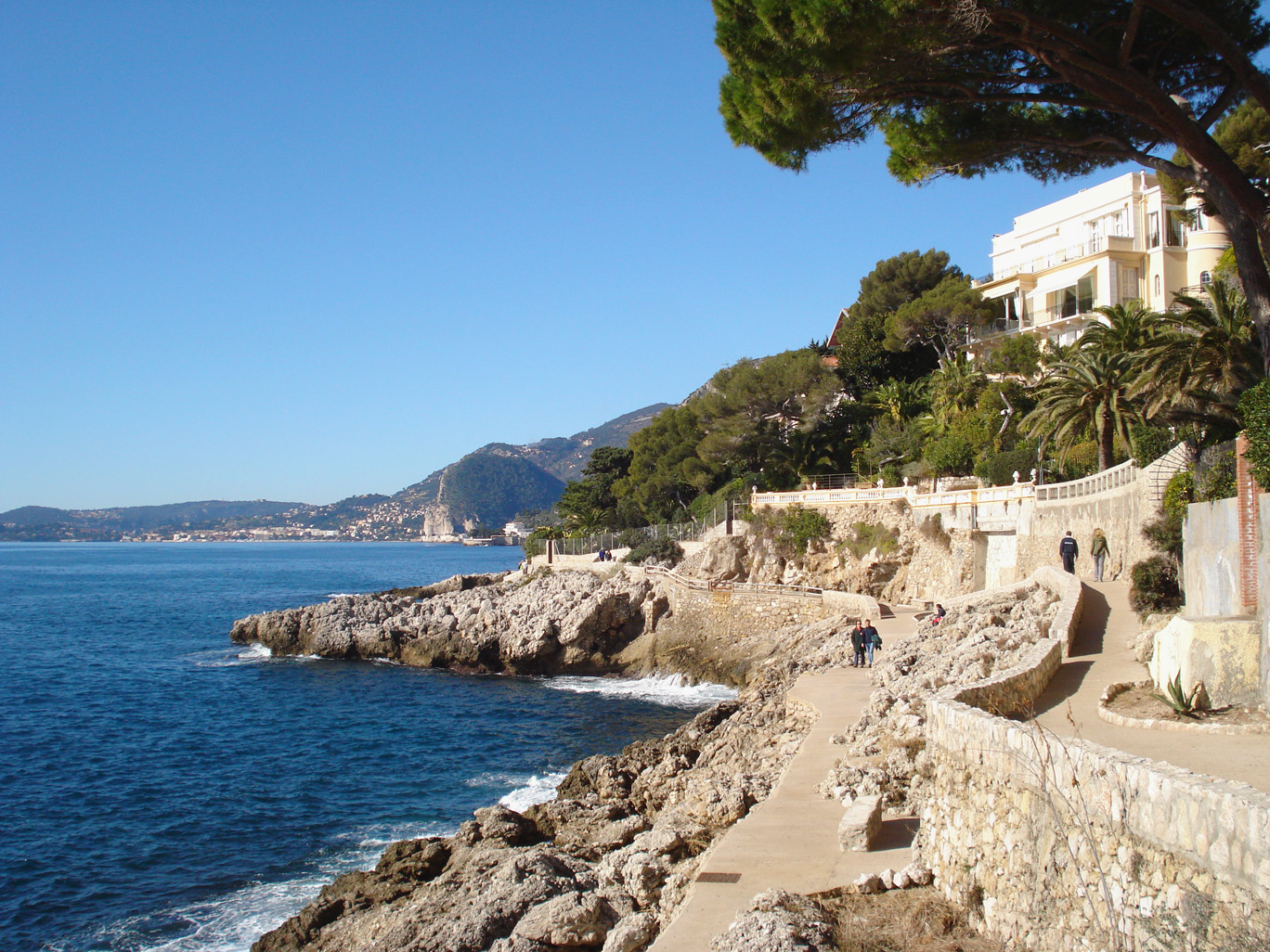
- A view on the Mediterranean coastline in Cap-d'Ail

- Coat of arms
- Location of Cap-d'Ail
- Location within France Location within Provence-Alpes-Côte d'Azur
- Coordinates: 43°43′19″N 7°24′23″E
- Country: France
- Region: Provence-Alpes-Côte d'Azur
- Department: Alpes-Maritimes
- Arrondissement: Nice
- Canton: Beausoleil
- Intercommunality: Métropole Nice Côte d'Azur

Government
  - Mayor (2026–32): Xavier Beck
- Area^{1}: 2.04 km^{2} (0.79 sq mi)
- Highest elevation: 540 m (1,770 ft)
- Lowest elevation: 0 m (0 ft)
- Population (2023): 4,482
  - Density: 2,200/km^{2} (5,690/sq mi)
- Time zone: UTC+01:00 (CET)
  - Summer (DST): UTC+02:00 (CEST)
- INSEE/Postal code: 06032 /06320
- ^{1} French Land Register data, which excludes lakes, ponds, glaciers > 1 km^{2} (0.386 sq mi or 247 acres) and river estuaries.

Cap-d'Ail (French pronunciation: [kap daj]; Occitan: Caup d'Alh; Italian: Capodaglio or Capo d'Aglio) is a seaside commune in the Alpes-Maritimes department in the Provence-Alpes-Côte d'Azur region in Southeastern France.

== Geography ==
Cap-d'Ail borders the areas of La Colle, Les Révoires and Fontvieille in the Principality of Monaco.

Contemporary Cap-d'Ail is a seaside resort with a busy shopping district on the Basse Corniche and quiet residential areas. Many people who work in Monaco live there. Plage Mala is prized by many day trippers from Monaco and Nice.

Cap-d'Ail is served by a 1881 station on the Marseille–Ventimiglia railway, the last before the Monégasque border.

The Stade Didier Deschamps is located down the street from the Monaco border and Stade Louis II, and as such often hosts matches in Monaco's national amateur company football tournament Challenge Prince Rainier III and used to host the matches of the Monaco national football team as of 2017. The stadium is also home to US Cap d'Ail Football who play in District 1 Côte d'Azur (Tier 9) as of the 2024-25 season.

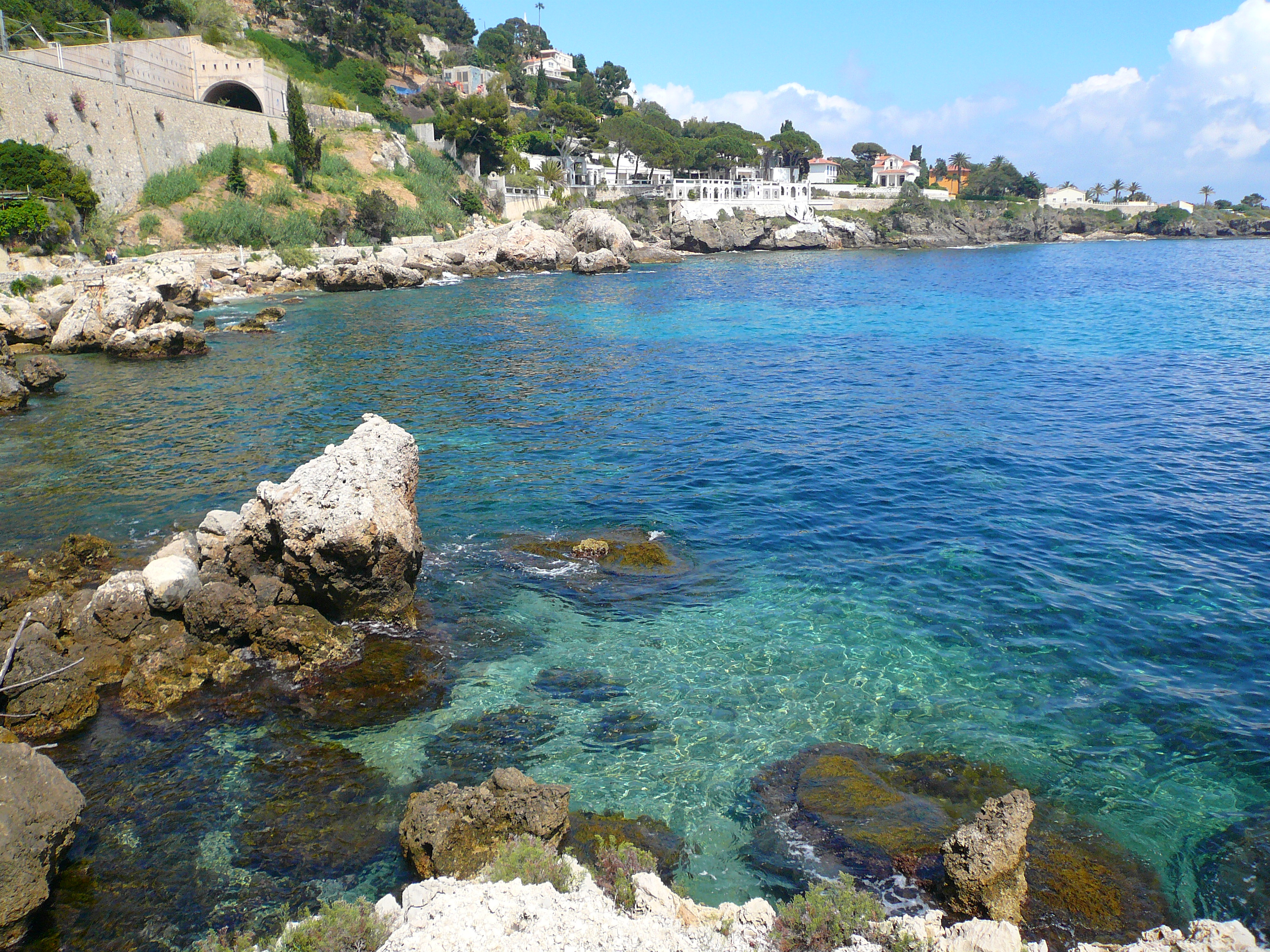
Coastline in Cap-d'Ail

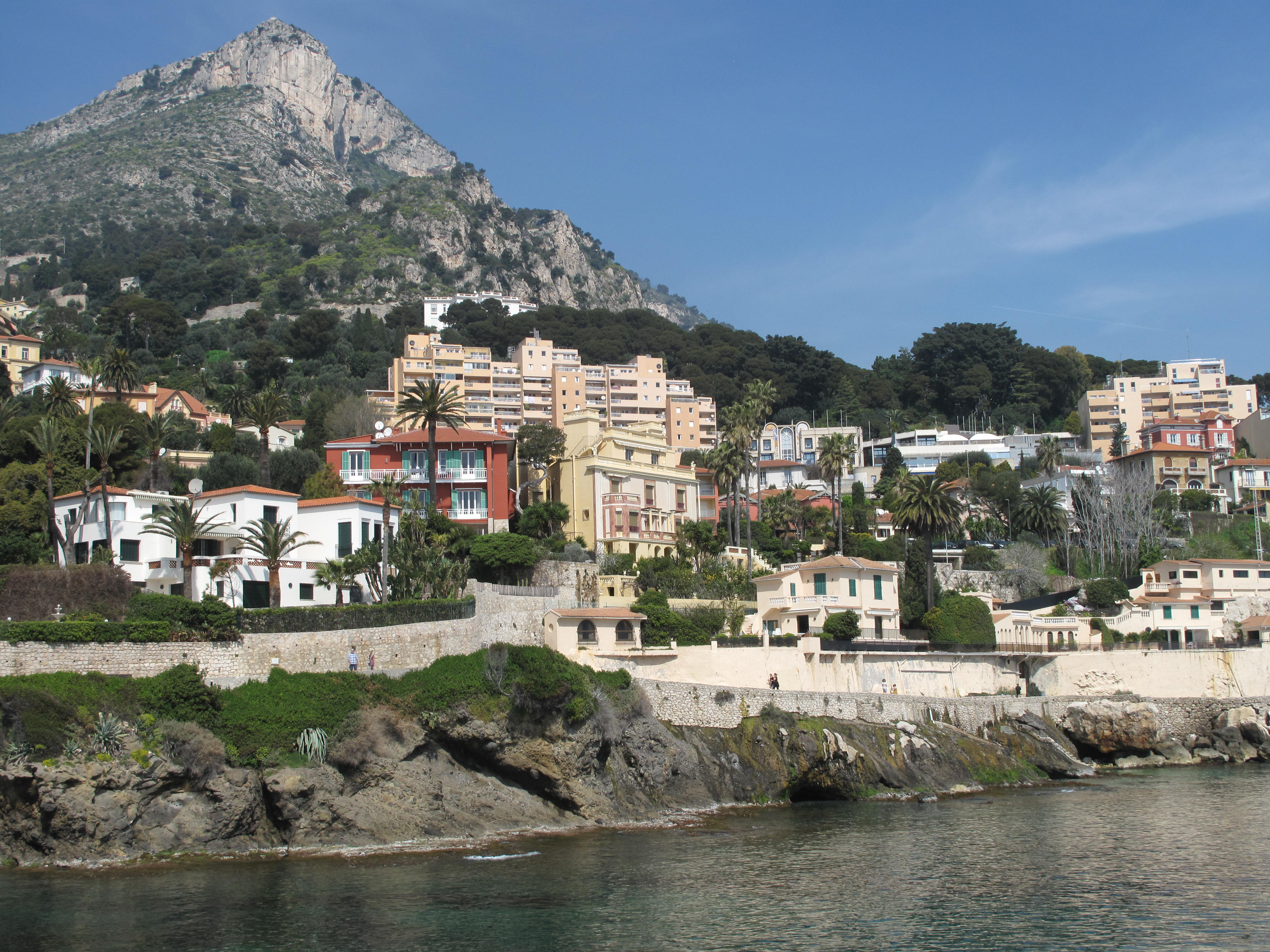
Cap-d'Ail from the sea

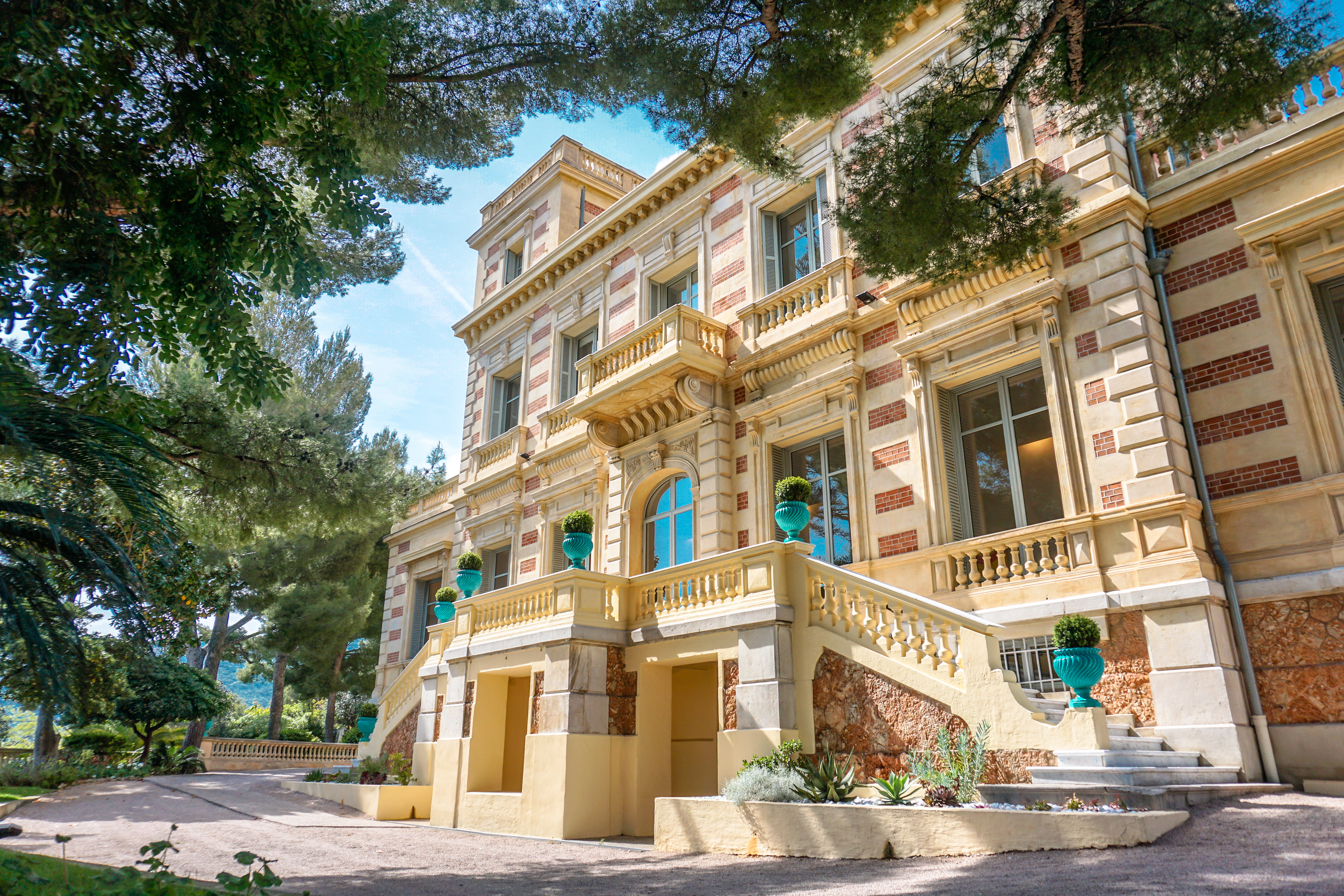
Château des Terrasses

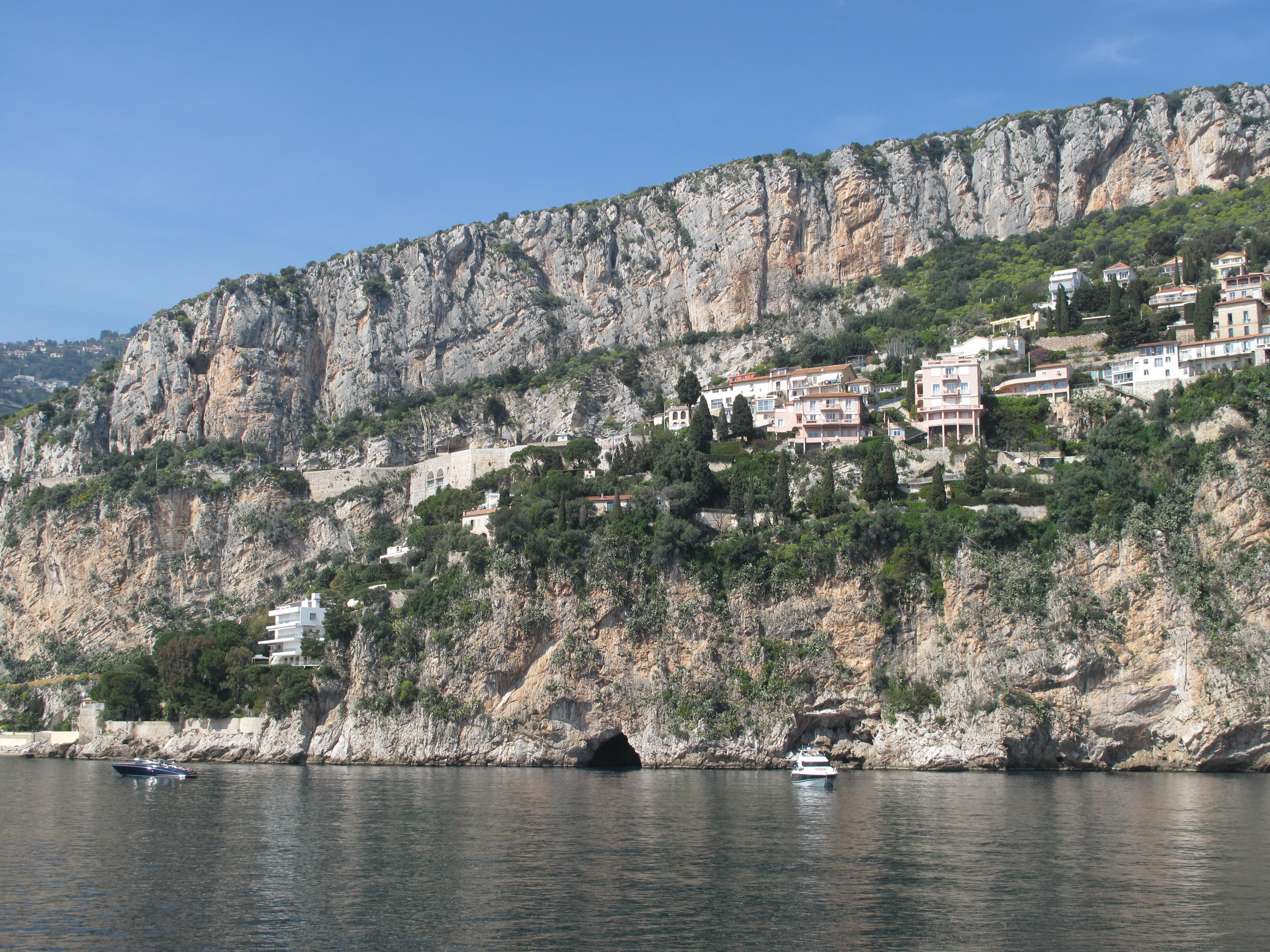
Sea cliffs

== History ==
On 13 September 1982, Princess Grace de Monaco was fatally injured in a car accident when she lost control of her vehicle while driving on the winding road at Cap-d'Ail.

== Demographics ==
Historical population
Year	Pop.	±% p.a.
1968	4,200	—
1975	4,282	+0.28%
1982	4,402	+0.40%
1990	4,859	+1.24%
1999	4,532	−0.77%
2007	4,942	+1.09%
2012	4,741	−0.83%
2017	4,594	−0.63%
2023	4,482	−0.41%
Source: INSEE

== See also ==
- Communes of the Alpes-Maritimes department
