= International University of Monaco =

University in the Principality of Monaco

- Université internationale de Monaco (French)
- Motto: Semper Ad Altum
- Type: Private business school
- Established: 1986
- Parent institution: Omnes Education
- Affiliations: AACSB, AMBA
- Dean: Jean-Philippe Muller
- Students: c. 1,250 (2026)
- Location: La Condamine, Monaco; 43.7348°N 7.4183°E
- Website: monaco.edu

Founded in 1986, the International University of Monaco (IUM) (Université internationale de Monaco (French)) is a private business school located in the Principality of Monaco. Previously known as the University of Southern Europe until 2002, the institution is currently part of the Omnes Education group.

The university offers undergraduate and graduate business degrees taught in English, and holds international accreditations from the Association of MBAs (AMBA) and the Association to Advance Collegiate Schools of Business (AACSB).

== History and campus ==
The university was founded in 1986 and was originally known as the University of Southern Europe. Initially owned by a Swiss investment fund, the institution was acquired by the American company Career Education Corporation (CEC) in April 2010. In 2013, CEC sold its European education assets, including IUM, to the private equity firm Apax Partners. The institution later became part of Omnes Education.

Historically located at the Stade Louis II, the university moved its campus to the newly built "Stella" complex in the Condamine district in 2019. As of the 2026 academic year, the institution enrolls approximately 1,250 students.

== Academics ==
The university delivers undergraduate and graduate degree programs in business, with instruction conducted in English. It holds international accreditations from the Association of MBAs (AMBA) and the Association to Advance Collegiate Schools of Business (AACSB).

In the Financial Times global rankings for Masters in Finance (pre-experience), the university's Master of Science in Finance program was ranked 17th in 2025 and 20th in 2026.

== Notable alumni and faculty ==
=== Alumni ===
- Jelena Djokovic — Businesswoman and philanthropist
- Andrea Gaudenzi — Former professional tennis player and chairman of the ATP
- Marlene Nidecker (née Harnois) — Olympic medalist in Taekwondo

=== Faculty ===
- Ingo Böbel (1947–2020) — Professor of Managerial Economics and Business Strategy
