= Les Moneghetti =

Les Moneghetti Muneghëti (Monégasque)
- Ward of Monaco
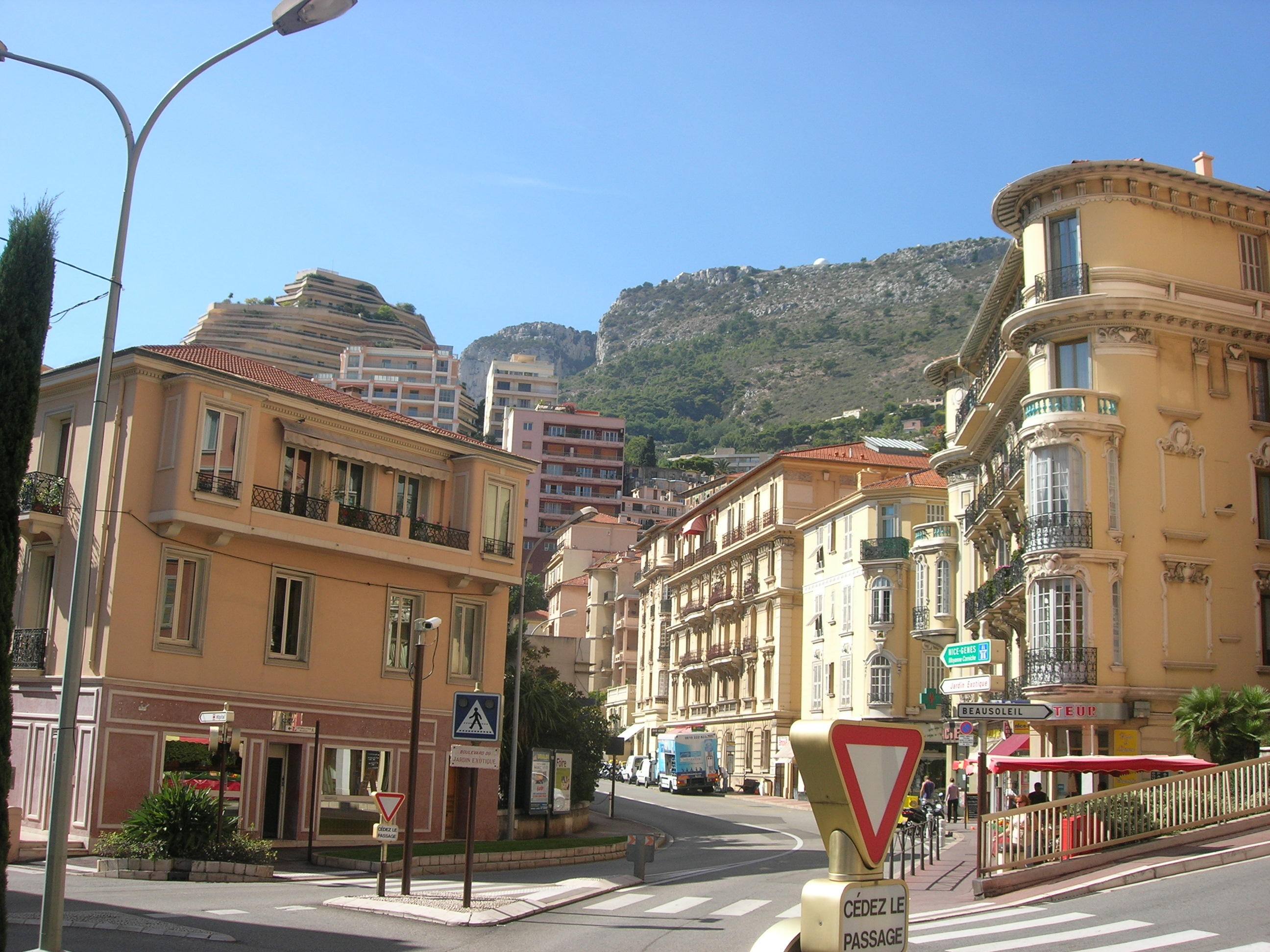
- Lamarck Square, Les Moneghetti; this square contains, a garden, a post office, and a police station; the parish church (Sacred Heart) is 46 metres (50 yd) away.

- Location in Monaco

- Location in relation to France
- Coordinates: 43°44′06″N 7°24′54″E
- Country: Monaco

Area
  - Total: 0.115196 km^{2} (0.044477 sq mi)

Population (2008)
  - Total: 3,131
  - Density: 27,180/km^{2} (70,400/sq mi)

Les Moneghetti (Monégasque: Muneghëti [muneˈɡeti]) is the north-central ward in the Principality of Monaco, bordering neighboring France. Moneghetti was incorporated in La Condamine.

== Overview ==
Situated in an area where the Alps drop into the Mediterranean Sea, Les Moneghetti has steep inclines.

Its contains the Church of the Sacred Heart (French: Eglise du Sacré-Cœur des Moneghetti), built between 1926 and 1929 as a Jesuit church, which became the neighborhood's parish church in 1965, and which is also the headquarters of the Monegasque national scouting organization AGSM.

Monaco's only railway station, the Monaco-Monte-Carlo station (French: Gare de Monaco-Monte-Carlo) is located in Les Moneghetti, and is served by scheduled trains of the French state-owned railway company SNCF, on the Marseille–Ventimiglia railway line.

Monaco's small military garrison, the Compagnie des Carabiniers du Prince, also has barracks in Les Moneghetti.

The area is also home to the International University of Monaco business school.

== Transport ==
The district is crossed by the Boulevard de Rainier III and the Boulevard du Jardin Exotique, as well as the Boulevard Belgique (Belgium). Other streets include Rue Bosio, Rue Louis Aureglia, Rue Augustin vento and Rue Malbousquet.

== See also ==
- Municipality of Monaco
