= Frenkel =

Frenkel is a surname. Notable people with the surname include:

- Aaron G. Frenkel (born 1957), Israeli entrepreneur and philanthropist
- Ana Balog Frenkel (1930–1945), Uruguayan Jewish Holocaust victim
- Alexander Frenkel (born 1985), German boxer of Ukrainian origin
- Boris Borvine Frenkel (1895–1984), Polish painter
- Daan Frenkel (born 1948), Dutch computational physicist
- Danielle Frenkel (born 1987), Israeli high jumper
- Douglas Frenkel, American law professor
- Edward Frenkel (born 1968), mathematician and filmmaker
- Heinrich Frenkel (1860–1931), Swiss physician
- Hermann Frenkel (1850–1932), partner of the Jacquier and Securius Bank
- Igor Frenkel (born 1952), Russian-American mathematician
- Israel Frenkel (1853–1890), Polish-Jewish translator
- Jacob A. Frenkel (born 1943), Israeli economist and businessman
- James Frenkel (born 1948), American science fiction book editor
- Lisa Frenkel, American pediatrician, professor
- Maja Ruth Frenkel (born 1971), Croatian entrepreneur and politician
- Naftaly Frenkel (1883–1960), Soviet official
- Peter Frenkel (1939), East German race walker
- Richard Frenkel (born 1966), American patent lawyer
- Rina Frenkel (born 1956), Israeli politician
- Stefan Frenkel (1902–1979), American violinist
- Yakov Frenkel (1894–1952), Russian physicist, known for the Frenkel defect
- Yan Frenkel (1920–1989), Soviet composer
- Yitzhak Frenkel, also known as Isaac Frenkel or Alexandre Frenel (1899–1981), Israeli French painter and sculptor

== See also ==
- Frankel
- Fränkel
- Frankl
