= Hôtel Hermitage Monte-Carlo =

Hotel in Monte Carlo, Monaco

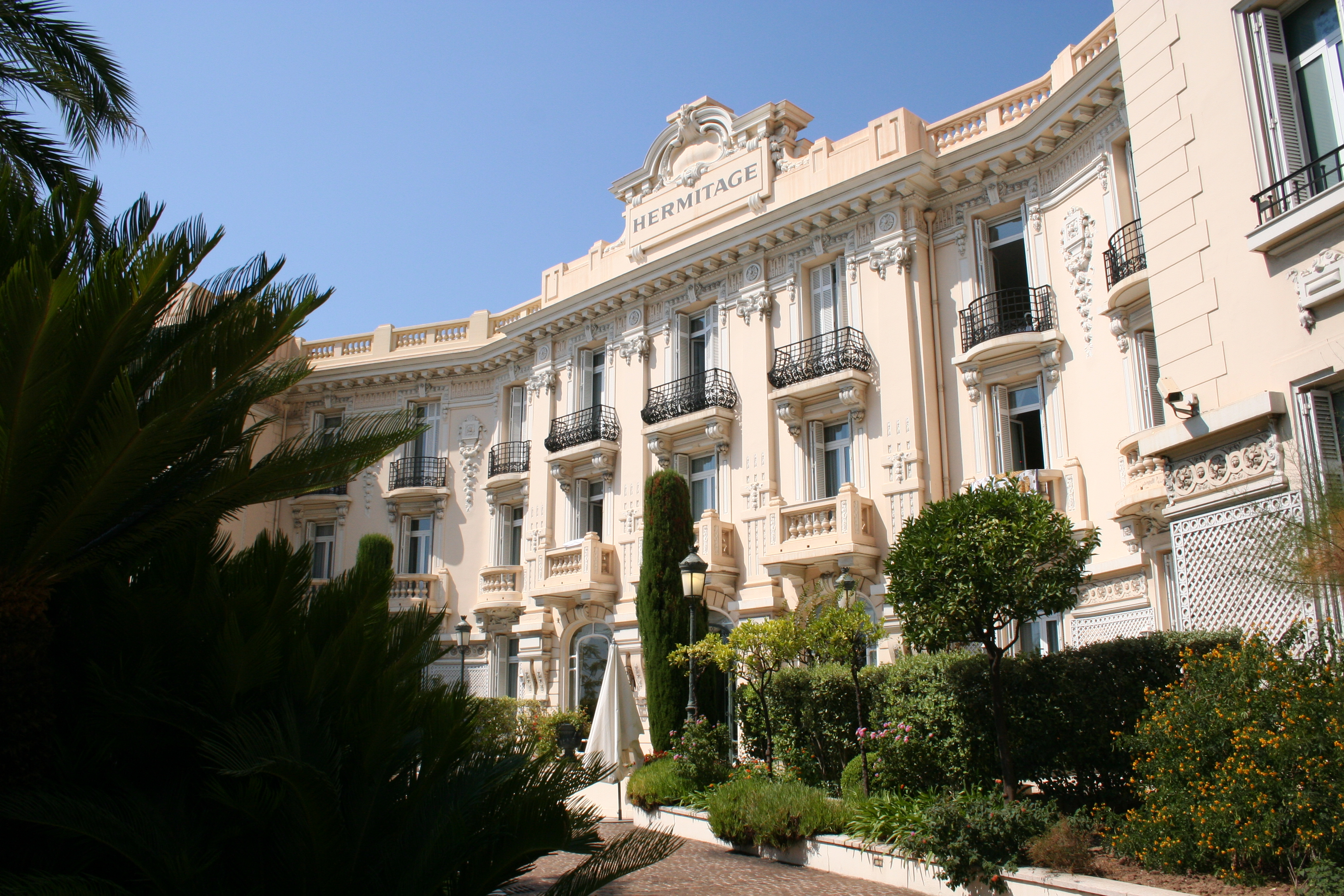
- Interactive map of the Hôtel Hermitage Monte-Carlo area

General information
- Type: Luxury hotel
- Architectural style: Belle Époque
- Location: Monte Carlo, Monaco
- Opened: 1896; 130 years ago
- Owner: Société des Bains de Mer
- Affiliation: The Leading Hotels of the World

Design and construction
- Architects: Jean Marquet; Gustave Eiffel

Other information
- Number of rooms: 278
- Number of suites: 35
- Number of restaurants: 1

Website
- hotelhermitagemontecarlo.com

The Hôtel Hermitage Monte-Carlo is a luxury hotel in the heart of Monaco. It was built from 1890 to 1896 in the Belle Époque style by the architect Jean Marquet, with the participation of Gustave Eiffel. The hotel belongs to the Société des Bains de Mer.

== Location ==
The hotel overlooks Monaco Harbor and the Mediterranean Sea. It is classified as Monument.

It is one of the elite hotels of Monaco, along with the Hôtel de Paris, the Monte-Carlo Beach and the Monte-Carlo Bay Hotel & Resort.

Gustave Eiffel was involved with some of the design and features at the hotel.

== Features ==
- The hotel belongs to the Société des Bains de Mer
- 278 rooms, including 35 suites and junior suites, and 8 suites Exclusive (Monte-Carlo Diamond Suites)
- A restaurant with panoramic terrace: Yannick Alléno à l’Hôtel Hermitage Monte-Carlo, Michelin 1-star
- A banquet hall closed: the Salle Belle Epoque (430 m^{2})
- 8 flexible meeting rooms
- The Jardin d'Hiver (Winter garden) with its cupola signed Gustave Eiffel
- Lobby-bar: the Limùn Bar
- A piano bar
- Direct access to Thermes Marins de Monte-Carlo (SPA)

== See also ==
- Monte Carlo
