= Monte-Carlo Beach =

Hotel in Roquebrune-Cap-Martin, France

Coordinates: 43.751683°N 7.443847°E

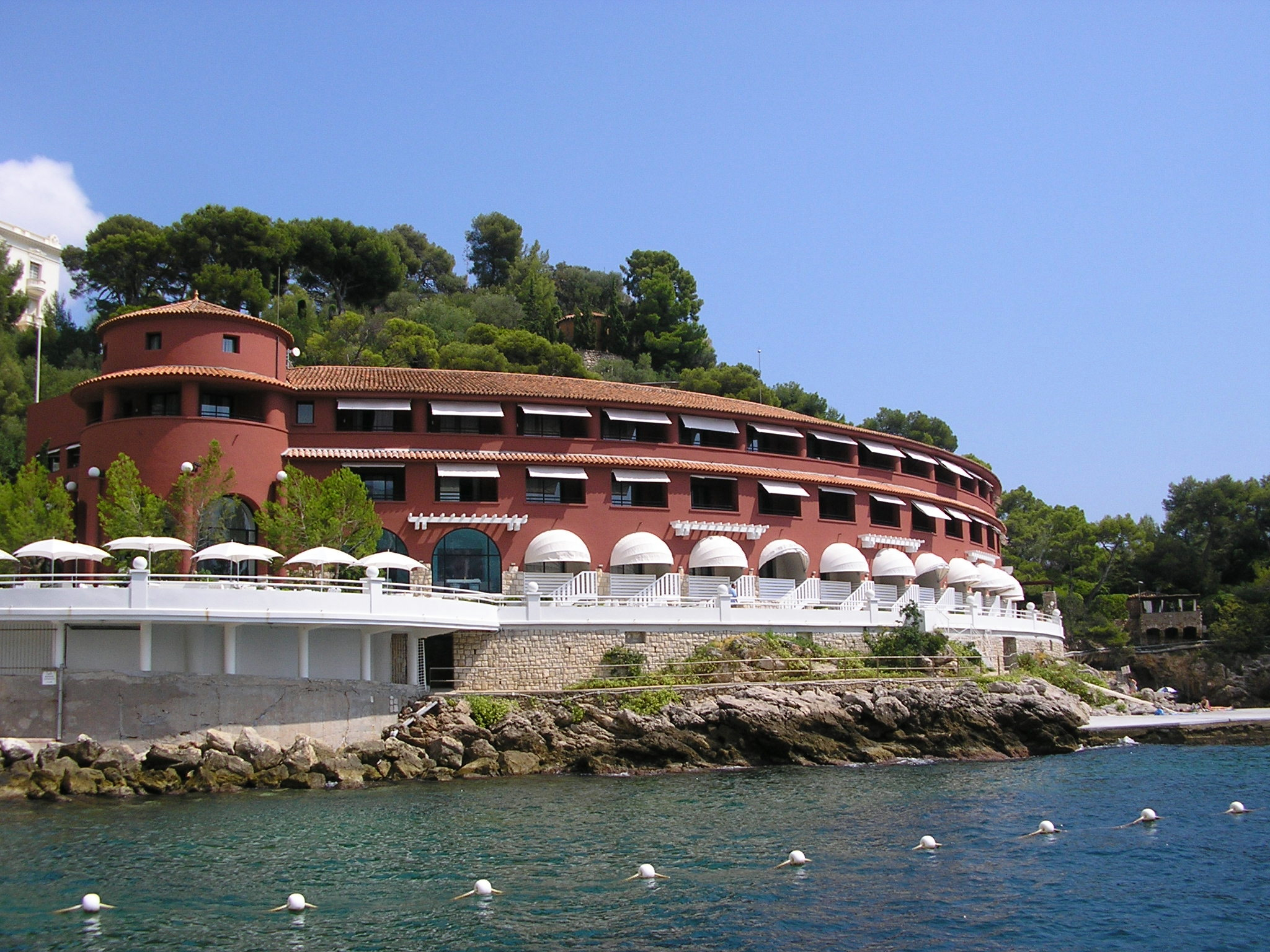
- Interactive map of the Monte-Carlo Beach area

General information
- Type: Resort hotel
- Location: Roquebrune-Cap-Martin, France, Avenue Princesse Grace
- Opened: 1929; 97 years ago
- Owner: Société des Bains de Mer

Other information
- Number of rooms: 40
- Number of suites: 14
- Number of restaurants: 3

Website
- montecarlobeach.com

The Monte-Carlo Beach is a resort hotel located in Roquebrune-Cap-Martin, a commune in the Alpes-Maritimes department of southeastern France. Situated on the Côte d'Azur, just east of Monaco, the hotel belongs to the Société des Bains de Mer (SBM). It was built in 1929 by the architect Roger Seassal and was redesigned in 2009 by India Mahdavi.

== Location ==
Despite its ownership and name, the Monte-Carlo Beach hotel is in Roquebrune-Cap-Martin, France, not in Monaco itself. It joins three hotels owned by SBM in Monaco – the Hôtel de Paris, the Hôtel Hermitage Monte-Carlo and the Monte-Carlo Bay Hotel & Resort.

In 2009, the Monte-Carlo Beach became a member of Relais & Châteaux.

== Features ==
- 40 rooms, including 14 suites
- Three restaurants: The Deck, Elsa and La Vigie
- A large reception room: The Deck
- Two meeting rooms
- A nightclub: The Sea Lounge
- A spa: the Monte-Carlo Beach SPA

== See also ==
- Monte Carlo
- Villa La Vigie, Roquebrune-Cap-Martin
