= Villa La Vigie, Roquebrune-Cap-Martin =

Mansion in France

Coordinates: 43°45′04″N 7°26′42″E

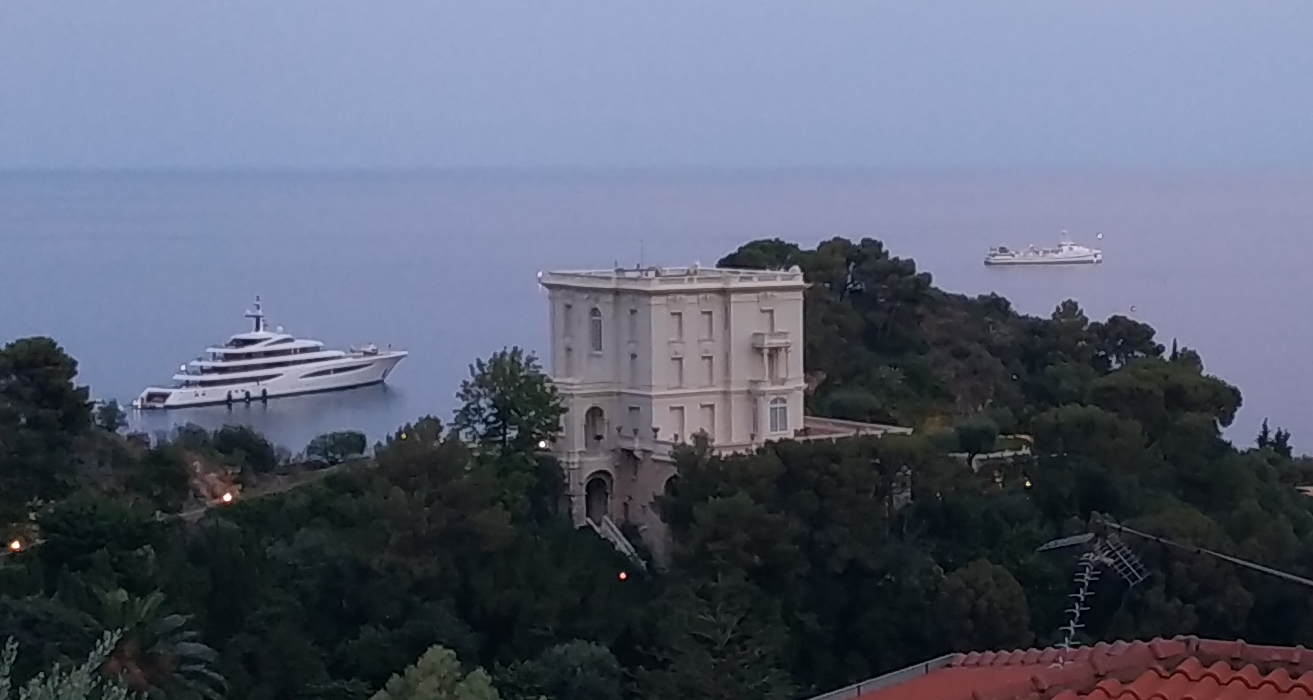
Villa La Vigie in 2020

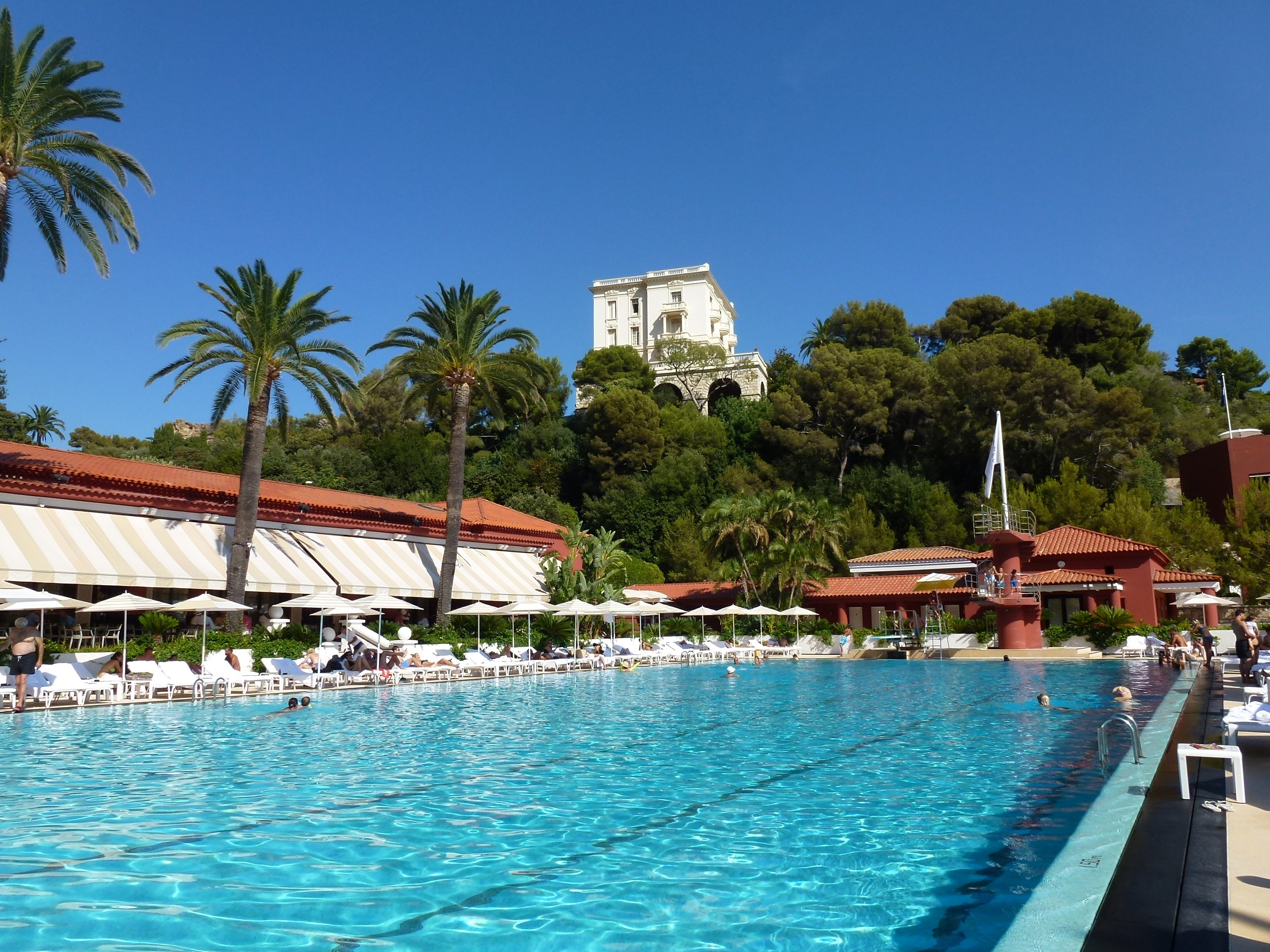
The villa overlooking the Monte-Carlo Beach hotel

Villa La Vigie is a historic villa in Roquebrune-Cap-Martin on the Côte d'Azur in southeastern France. It was built in 1902 by the British publisher Sir William Ingram, 1st Baronet, then later occupied and renovated by the German fashion designer Karl Lagerfeld starting in the late 1980s.

== Location ==
The house is located on the Pointe de la Veille at Roquebrune-Cap-Martin in Provence-Alpes-Côte d'Azur. 'La Vigie' means 'the lookout tower' or 'the vigil'. Writing in the Chicago Tribune, Dennis Thim described the house as a "wedding cake confection, which towers several hundred feet above the rock-strewn sand". The house is three storeys in height and faces the Mediterranean Sea on three sides. The fashion designer Karl Lagerfeld described the house as being "all about the light", as "It is like an open-air studio with this light that is just sublime".

== History ==
It was built in 1902 for the British publisher Sir William Ingram, 1st Baronet, in the Belle Époque style. Ingram owned The Illustrated London News and The Sketch. The villa was the subject of a photo feature in The Sketch in 1903. A. M. Williamson visited Ingram at La Vigie shortly after it was built and recalled the villa as always having been full of "important guests spending weeks" during the social season.

It was rented in February and March 1909 by Daisy, Princess of Pless. She wrote of her time at the villa in the 1931 publication of her diaries, Better Left Unsaid. She described the interior in her diary entry of 20 February 1909 as having " ... got this villa quite nice at last with some gay chintz (which I love), mauve and pink wistaria, and instead of the horrible glaring chandeliers in the middle of the ceiling I have hired some shaded lamps". She described the setting of the villa as " ... right on the sea, built high up on a rock, a beautiful situation, one side grass and olive trees and in front cedar trees down to the sea". Her sister Constance Grosvenor, Duchess of Westminster (known as Shelagh), stayed with her at the villa in March 1909.

In 1938, it was bought by the Glaswegian businessman Sir John Mactaggart. The villa was unoccupied after World War II and was for sale in the 1950s, having been owned by the Société des bains de mer de Monaco (SBM) since 1952. In March 1956, it was visited by Winston Churchill and the Greek shipowner Aristotle Onassis with the chair of the SBM, Charles Simon.

=== Karl Lagerfeld ===
In 1986, the villa was sighted by fashion designer Karl Lagerfeld when he was having lunch at the Monte Carlo Country Club, and he enquired into its ownership. It was in a dilapidated condition, having not been occupied for 40 years, and Lagerfeld was told by Prince Rainier III of Monaco that if he restored it, he could be a tenant of the property for the rest of his life. By 1988, Lagerfeld had spent $14 million (equivalent to $38,111,986 in 2025) restoring and refurbishing the house with the assistance of Patrick Hourcade. He constructed a staircase inside the house that is modelled on the one at Château de Saint-Cloud. The house was similar to Lagerfeld's childhood home overlooking the River Elbe in Hamburg.

Lagerfeld felt that the villa was superior to the Prince's Palace of Monaco in Monaco-Ville, feeling that the princely family's " ... private quarters are small, and Rainier isn't too interested in interior design". Lagerfeld also rented a triplex apartment with a roof garden in Monaco and had a cabana at the Monte-Carlo Beach hotel, which is located near the villa. Lagerfeld's Bentley convertible was colour-matched to the villa. Lagerfeld described the house as "the safest place in the world ... its impossible to get near the place. No public road passes by and you have to go through two gates to get inside. It doesn't even have an address, so no one can write to me here". Lagerfeld decorated the house himself after falling out with the Parisian decorator Sabine Imbert. The garden at La Vigie under Lagerfeld was designed by his companion Jacques de Bascher. It is a typical Mediterranean garden of cypress, olive, and palm trees.

Lagerfeld staged numerous photoshoots at La Vigie during his time as artistic director of Chanel. The large ground floor was used as a dance floor and photography studio. The first floor was turned from three sitting rooms into a ballroom and a billiard room. Lagerfeld described sitting rooms on the first floor as 'bourgeois'. Lagerfeld lived on the top floor of the villa with a canopied Marie Antoinette bed, a library, and two bathrooms – one with a view of the Mediterranean Sea in the morning, the other facing Monte Carlo at night. His rooms displayed several portraits by the 18th-century painter Élisabeth Vigée Le Brun. Notable furniture in the house included three desks designed by David Roentgen, one of which was owned by Queen Louise of Prussia, and furniture by Andre Dubreuil.

The house had two guest suites on the second floor and a separate apartment for Lagerfeld's companion Jacques de Bascher. Lagerfeld designed a second floor room in red silk damask which he called the Rothschild salon. Lagerfeld would fraternise with Princess Caroline of Monaco while staying at the house, as well as with photographer Helmut Newton and his wife, fellow photographer Alice Springs (known as June).

In 2021, the villa became available for rent.
