= Monte-Carlo Bay Hotel & Resort =

Hotel in Larvotto, Monaco

Coordinates: 43.748845°N 7.438845°E

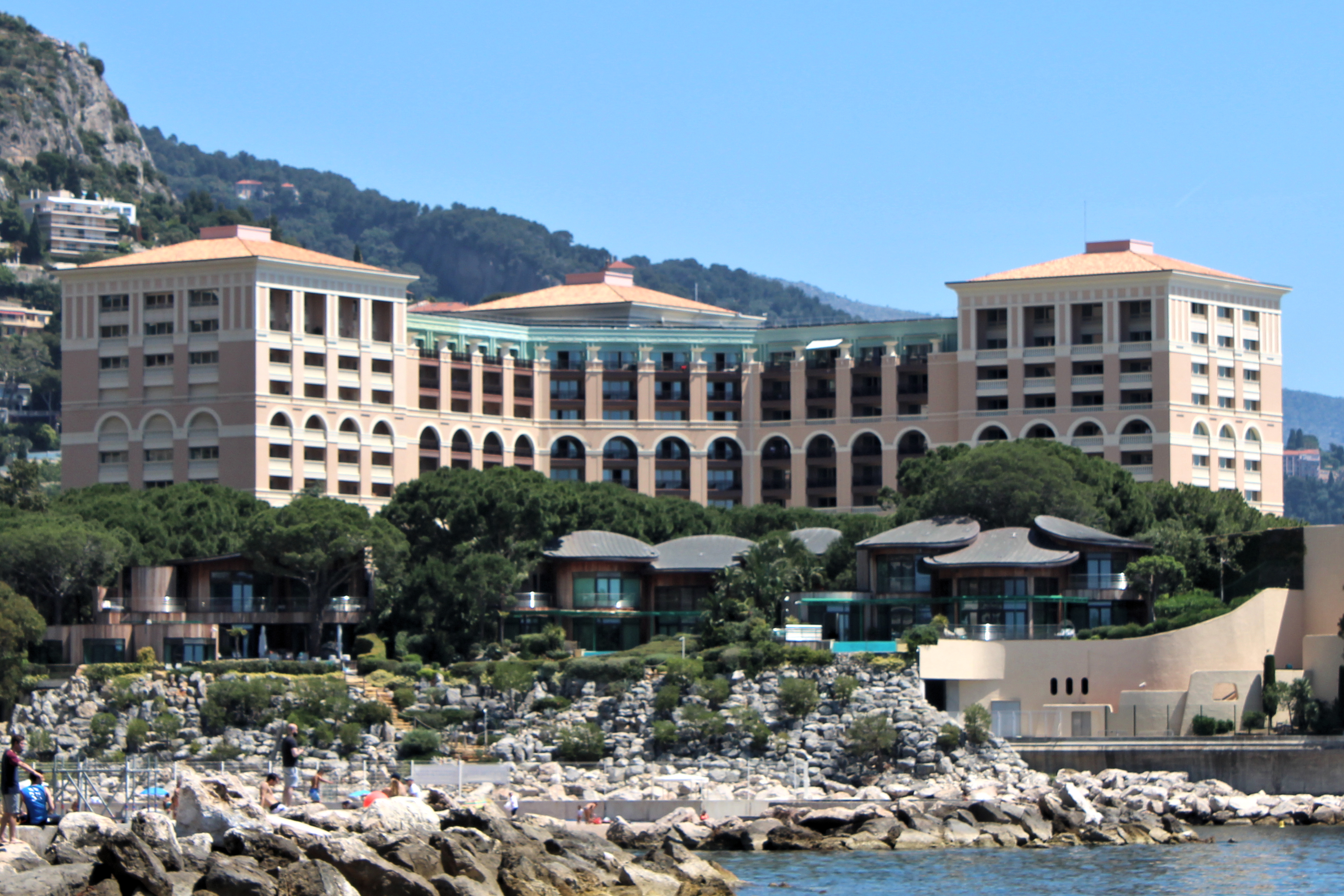
- Interactive map of the Monte-Carlo Bay Hotel & Resort area

General information
- Type: Resort hotel
- Location: Larvotto, Monaco, 40 Avenue Princesse Grace
- Opened: 2005; 21 years ago
- Owner: Société des Bains de Mer

Other information
- Number of rooms: 334
- Number of suites: 22
- Number of restaurants: 3

Website
- montecarlobay.com

The Monte-Carlo Bay Hotel & Resort is a resort hotel located in the Larvotto ward on the eastern edge of Monaco. It is owned by the Société des Bains de Mer.

== History ==
The hotel opened in 2005.

In April 2018, the hotel introduced a Rafael Nadal suite on the tenth floor of the hotel. In August 2018, the hotel officially switched to solar energy.

== Description ==
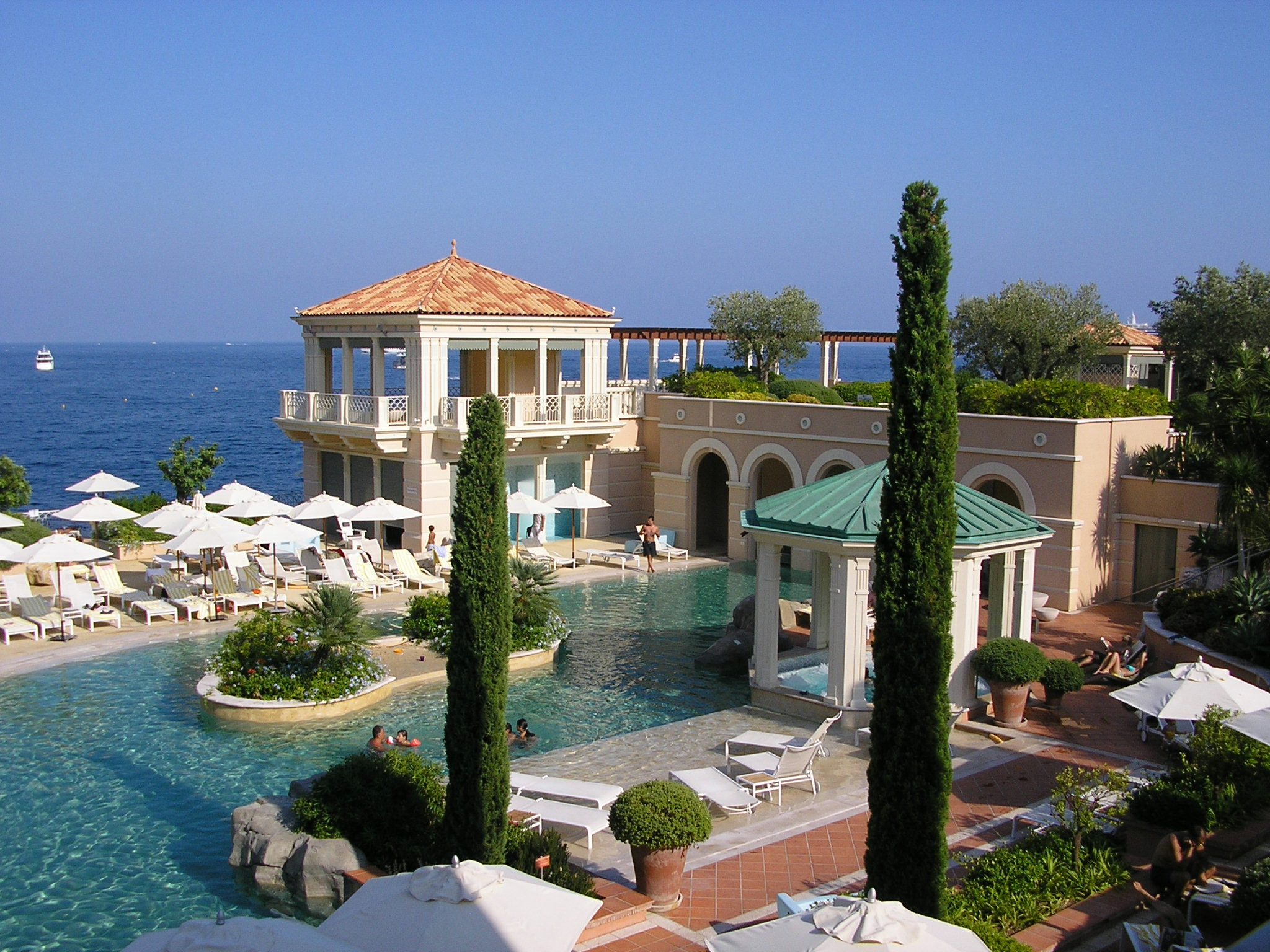
Resort pool and deck area

Overlooking the Mediterranean Sea, the 10-floor, 334-room Monte-Carlo Bay Hotel & Resort is one of the elite hotels in Monaco, along with the Hôtel de Paris, the Hôtel Hermitage Monte-Carlo and the Monte-Carlo Beach. The indoor-outdoor swimming pool runs along the 5-acre garden and takes swimmers to a sandy-bottomed lagoon at the tip of the promontory.

During the summer, tourists from the Middle East make up 10% of the hotel's clientele.

The resort has hosted the Rolex Monte-Carlo Masters tennis competition.

== Awards ==
- 2019: Villegiature award for "Best Hotel Pool in Europe"

== See also ==
- Monte Carlo
- Monte-Carlo Beach
