= Lisa Frenkel =

American pediatrician

Lisa M. Frenkel is an American pediatrician currently Professor at University of Washington and an Elected Fellow of the American Association for the Advancement of Science.

== Education ==
She earned her B.A. at University of Kansas from 1973–77 and her M.D. at University of Kansas Medical Center from 1977-81.

== Research ==
Her research involves HIV transmission including from mother to child and also childhood infections and viruses. Her highest cited paper is Antiretroviral prophylaxis for HIV prevention in heterosexual men and women, at 1650 times, according to Google Scholar.

== Publications ==
- Micek, MA; Blanco, AJ; Beck, IA; Dross, S; Matunha, L; Montoya, P; Seidel, K; Gantt, S; Matediane, E; Jamisse, L; Gloyd, S; Frenkel, LM (2010). "Nevirapine resistance by timing of HIV type 1 infection in infants treated with single-dose nevirapine". Clin Infect Dis. 50 (10): 1405–14. doi:10.1086/652151. PMC 3038662. PMID 20384494..
- Micek, MA; Blanco, AJ; Carlsson, J; Beck, IA; Dross, S; Matunha, L; Seidel, K; Montoya, P; Gantt, S; Matediana, E; Jamisse, L; Gloyd, S; Frenkel, LM (2012). "Effects of short-course zidovudine on the selection of nevirapine-resistant HIV-1 in women taking single-dose nevirapine". J Infect Dis. 205 (12): 1811–5. doi:10.1093/infdis/jis282. PMC 3415891. PMID 22492850..
- Baeten, JM; Donnell, D; Ndase, P; Mugo, NR; Campbell, JD; Wangisi, J; Tappero, JW; Bukusi, EA; Cohen, CR; Katabira, E; Ronald, A; Tumwesigye, E; Were, E; Fife, KH; Kiarie, J; Farquhar, C; John-Stewart, G; Kakia, A; Odoyo, J; Mucunguzi, A; Nakku-Joloba, E; Twesigye, R; Ngure, K; Apaka, C; Tamooh, H; Gabona, F; Mujugira, A; Panteleeff, D; Thomas, KK; Kidoguchi, L; Krows, M; Revall, J; Morrison, S; Haugen, H; Emmanuel-Ogier, M; Ondrejcek, L; Coombs, RW; Frenkel, L; Hendrix, C; Bumpus, NN; Bangsberg, D; Haberer, JE; Stevens, WS; Lingappa, JR (2012). "Antiretroviral Prophylaxis for HIV Prevention in Heterosexual Men and Women". N Engl J Med. 367 (5): 399–410. doi:10.1056/NEJMoa1108524. PMC 3770474. PMID 22784037.
- Wagner, T; McKernan, J; Tobin, N; Tapia, K; Mullins, J; Frenkel, L (2013). "An increasing proportion of monotypic HIV-1 DNA sequences during antiretroviral treatment suggests proliferation of HIV-infected cells". J Virol. 87 (3): 1770–1778. doi:10.1128/JVI.01985-12. PMC 3554159. PMID 23175380.
- Bull, ME; Heath, LM; McKernan-Mullin, JL; Kraft, KM; Acevedo, L; Hitti, JE; Cohn, SE; Tapia, KA; Holte, SE; Dragavon, JA; Coombs, RW; Mullins, JI; Frenkel, LM (2013). "Human immunodeficiency viruses appear compartmentalized to the female genital tract in cross-sectional analyses but genital lineages do not persist over time". J Infect Dis. 207 (8): 1206–15. doi:10.1093/infdis/jit016. PMC 3603533. PMID 23315326.
