= Elizabeth Anne Bukusi =

Kenyan physician

Elizabeth Anne Bukusi FAAS is a research professor working within the field of obstetrics and gynaecology, and global health. Bukusi's main areas of research focus around sexually transmitted infections, women's health, reproductive health, and HIV care, prevention and treatment. Bukusi is the Chief Research Officer at the Kenya Medical Research Institute (KEMRI) and led a "landmark" study on the use of PrEP in Kenya.

== Education ==
Bukusi gained her general medical degree, followed by her Masters in obstetrics and gynaecology from the University of Nairobi. She then went on to earn a certificate in international health, Masters in public health (MPH) and a PhD from the University of Washington's Department of Epidemiology. Subsequent qualifications include a post-graduate diploma in Research ethics from the University of Cape Town, then a Masters in Bioethics from the Sind Institute of Urology and Transplantation.

== Research ==
Bukusi's Masters in Public Health, completed in 2000, studied the male factor in bacterial vaginosis in Kenya, and her PhD then continued this path of research with her thesis titled: 'Bacterial Vaginosis: A Randomized Trial to Reduce Recurrence'. In 2006 Bukusi was awarded her PhD, and published a paper in the journal Sexually Transmitted Diseases, 'Bacterial vaginosis: risk factors among Kenyan women and their male partners'.

In 2010 Bukusi published 'Genital hygiene practices of fishermen targeted for a topical microbicide intervention against sexually transmitted infections in Kisumu, Kenya', within the International Journal of STD and AIDS.

Bukusi's academic roles include chief research officer at KEMRI; chair of the Bioethics Society of Kenya; research professor at the University of Washington; honorary lecturer at Aga Khan University; and volunteer clinical faculty professor at the University of California San Francisco. Other outstanding studies she has participated in include; Association between Mycoplasma genitalium and acute endometritis. Bacterial vaginosis associated with increased risk of Female-to-Male HIV-1 transmission: A prospective cohort analysis among African couples. HIV/AIDS stigma and refusal of HIV testing among pregnant women in rural Kenya: Results from the MAMAS study. This study found that anticipations of HIV/AIDS stigma can be barriers to acceptance of HIV testing by pregnant women. HIV pre-exposure prophylaxis for adolescent girls and young women in Africa: from efficacy trials to delivery. This article concluded that PrEP is feasible to implement in integrated reproductive health service delivery models to reach African AGYW. Retention in care and patient-reported reasons for undocumented transfer or stopping care among HIV-infected patients on Antiretroviral therapy in Eastern Africa: application of a sampling-based approach. Efficacy of isoniazid prophylactic therapy in prevention of tuberculosis in children: a meta–analysis. Efficacy of single-dose human Papillomavirus vaccination among young African women. Texting improves testing: a randomized trial of two-way SMS to increase postpartum prevention of mother-to-child transmission retention and infant HIV testing. This study established that text messaging significantly improved maternal postpartum visit attendance, but overall return rates for these visits remained low. Efficacy of pre-exposure prophylaxis for HIV-1 prevention among high risk heterosexuals: subgroup analyses from the Partners PrEP Study. The study concluded that among higher-risk subgroups in the Partners PrEP Study, including groups solely of higher-risk women, both TDF alone and combined FTC/TDF PrEP had consistently high efficacy for HIV-1 protection. Family model of HIV care and treatment: a retrospective study in Kenya. Rethinking HIV prevention to prepare for oral PrEP implementation for young African women. Antiretroviral prophylaxis for HIV prevention in heterosexual men and women. HIV incidence among women using intramuscular depot medroxyprogesterone acetate, a copper intrauterine device, or a levonorgestrel implant for contraception: a randomised, multicentre, open-label trial. This study did not find a substantial difference in HIV risk among the methods evaluated, and all methods were safe and highly effective. Cervical cancer prevention and treatment research in Africa: a systematic review from a public health perspective. and Integrated delivery of antiretroviral treatment and Pre-exposure Prophylaxis to HIV-1–Serodiscordant couples: A prospective implementation study in Kenya and Uganda.
