= Gav-Yam =

Israeli real estate company

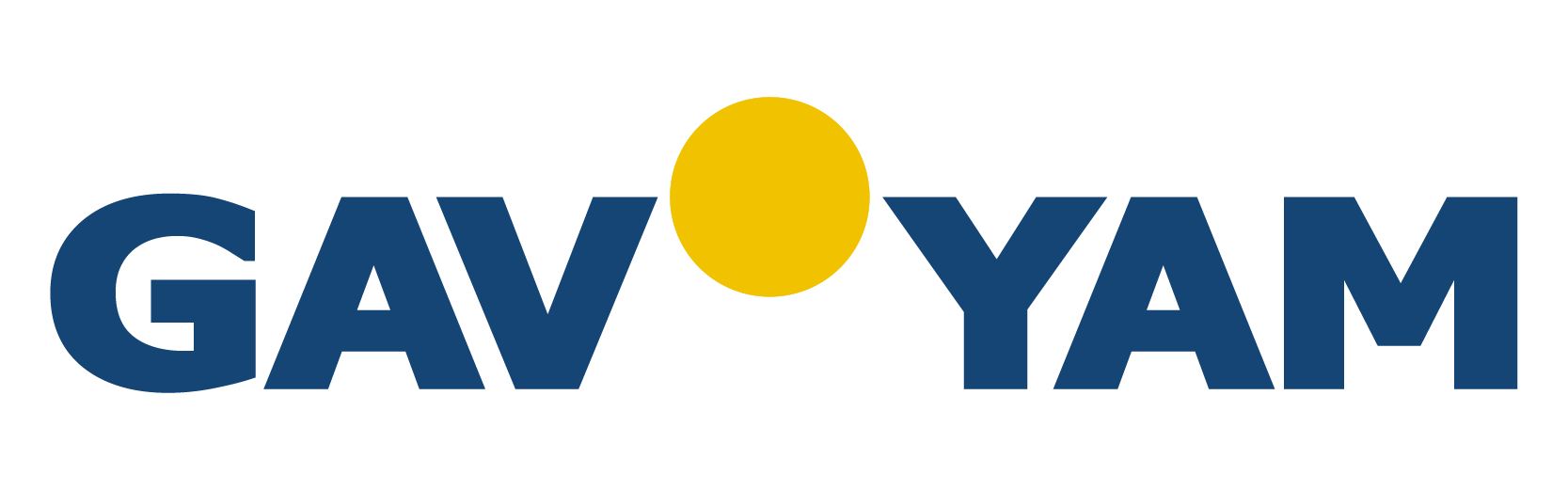
- Company type: Public company
- Traded as: BYSD
- Founded: 1928
- Founder: Economic Society for the Land of Israel
- Headquarters: Haifa
- Key people: Michael "Mikey" Zelkind Chairman; Avi Jacobovitz CEO
- Website: https://www.gav-yam.co.il/

Gav-Yam (Hebrew: גב-ים), sometimes referred to as Bayside Land Corporation in English, is an Israeli real estate company.

The Company went public in 1978 and is traded on the Tel Aviv Stock Exchange market. Gav-Yam share is part of the Tel Aviv 125 index.

Some properties associated with Gav-Yam include Totzeret HaAretz Towers, Matam in Haifa, and the Haifa International Convention Center.

== History ==
Gav-Yam was founded in June 1928 by the Economic Society for the Land of Israel, a company founded by Judge Louis Brandeis's party. The Economic Society established Gav-Yam to develop 5,000 dunams (12,355 acres) purchased in Haifa Bay from the Haifa Bay Training Company.

In 1939, Gav-Yam began building a residential neighborhood in Kiryat Yam (initially called Gav-Yam), which later became a city. In partnership with another company, Gav-Yam established a residential neighborhood that includes a commercial center in Kiryat Eliezer in Haifa. Gav-Yam was also responsible for projects in the Carmel.

The Company participated in the Jewish land purchase in Palestine. The land in Haifa Bay was bought with the Jewish National Fund. In this project, Gav-Yam planned the gulf area's construction, paved roads and established industrial infrastructure.

The company encouraged establishing factories on its lands in Haifa Bay and provided financial assistance to various factories to build and develop an industrial area. Among the assisted companies were Vulcan Automotive, Phoenicia, Telma and the Company for Cables and Wires.

With the founding of Israel in 1948, Gav-Yam was involved in developing industrial areas in various places in the country, leased land from the Israel Lands Administration and the Ministry of Commerce and Industry, and continued to build industrial and commercial buildings for rent.

Between 1954 and 1968, Gav-Yam participated in the construction and management of the Kishon Port and provided the port with many land reserves that the company owned.

In 2021, Gav-Yam's ToHa Tower in Tel Aviv won award for best skyscraper in the Middle East.

== Ownership ==
In 1970, PCB (Property and Building Corporation, part of the IDB Group) became the sole owner of Gav-Yam. In June 1978, the company first published a financial prospectus for an IPO, and its shares were registered for trading on the Tel Aviv Stock Exchange.

On July 1, 2019, the assets holding rates and the company's issued capital decreased from 51.7% to 40.0%.

At 2020-2021, Equity Finance Corporation, owned by billionaire Aaron Frenkel, acquired control of the company.

In December 2021, Frenkel sold his stake in Gav-Yam (37.2%) to Property and Building Corporation for 3.25 billion NIS (including the dividends received during the investment period, and until the completion of the transaction). Upon the final calculation of the transaction, the share price accumulated to 40.5 NIS (5% above the market price). Frenkel recorded a 125% return on his investment in Gav-Yam and a profit of 1.25 billion NIS within one year.

As of March 8, 2022, the controlling shareholder of the company is Property and Building Corporation.
