= The Leading Hotels of the World =

International hotel marketing organization

The Leading Hotels of the World, Ltd.
- Type: Private
- Industry: Hospitality
- Founded: 1928; 98 years ago
- Headquarters: 485 Lexington Avenue; New York City, U.S.
- Key people: Andrea Scherz (Chairman); Shannon Knapp (President and CEO)
- Owners: Hotel Representative AG; LHW Services GmbH
- Website: www.lhw.com

The Leading Hotels of the World, Ltd. (LHW) is an international consortium of over 450 independent luxury hotels. Established in 1928, the member-owned organization is headquartered in New York City.

== History ==
=== Founding and early expansion (1928-1970s) ===
The Leading Hotels of the World (LHW) was founded in 1928 by a group of European hoteliers under the name the Leading Hotels of Europe. The 38 initial members – including current members Hotel Negresco in Nice, Hôtel de Paris and Hôtel Hermitage in Monte Carlo, Hotel Royal - Evian Resort, El Palace Barcelona (formerly Hotel Ritz), and the King David Hotel in Jerusalem – desired to entice Europe-bound leisure travelers coming from the United States, an up-and-coming market for European hotels. To this end, the first LHW office opened in New York City in 1928.

In 1930, the company renamed itself The Leading Hotels of Europe, Egypt, and Morocco, with the addition of hotels in both markets.

Edith L. Turner, an original LHW employee and travel expert, was appointed the company’s first president in 1950. She held the role for 16 years, until her death, after which she was succeeded by Mary Homi.

During the 1950s, membership grew to over 70 hotels, and in the 1970s due to increased demand for new destinations, the decision was made to expand to other continents and include independent luxury hotels from around the world. A few years later, in 1974, LHW became the first hotel organization to move from a manual reservation system to a computer-satellite based reservations system.

=== Global expansion (1970s-present) ===
In 1978, the company officially changed its name to The Leading Hotels of the World, Ltd. During the 1980s, LHW membership grew to over 200, and then surpassed 300 in the 1990s. By 2000, The Leading Hotels of the World had 338 member hotels in 75 countries. That year, a separate joint venture, Leading Quality Assurance, was established by LHW to conduct regular anonymous inspections of member hotels. By 2018, the company represented more than 400 hotels in over 80 countries.

During the 2019 coronavirus pandemic, when the hospitality industry was significantly impacted, LHW focused both on communicating with consumers and partners, sharing information on travel restrictions and hotel operational changes, shifted its strategic approach, and planned for recovery, and further became a strategic-business partner to each members’ long-term success.

As of 2026, LHW has more than 450 member hotels across Africa, the Middle East, Asia, Oceania, the Americas, and Europe, and accepts approximately 40 new members annually. The company will mark its centennial in 2028. Approximately 90 percent of its member hotels are independently managed and 80 percent are family-led. LHW is led by President and CEO Shannon Knapp and Chairman Andrea Scherz, a third-generation proprietor and general manager of Gstaad Palace in Switzerland.

== Membership criteria and support ==
LHW consists of over 450 independent luxury hotels, majority of which are family-owned and independently managed. Membership requires a referral from an existing member, and members must meet and maintain certain criteria.

Member hotels include distinctive properties around the world, such as castles, mountain hideaways, safari camps and private islands.

In 2018, the organization announced plans to invest $30 million in technology over the next five years. Part of the funding came from the sale of Leading Quality Assurance (LQA), a joint venture program co-developed by LHW. That same year, LHW announced a new business model, one that required a down payment from all members. Moving forward, the payments would support initiatives such as the technology investment.

=== Loyalty program (Leaders Club) ===
Leaders Club is LHW's loyalty program. It was redesigned and relaunched in 2018 and includes a complimentary tiered membership with elite status tiers including Club and Sterling.

== Governance and leadership ==
=== Executive committee and ownership ===
LHW is a member-owned consortium governed by an executive committee consisting of seven hoteliers representing over 60 shareholder members.

Past chairmen include Jean-Jacques Gauer, manager of several establishments in Switzerland, Greece, Spain, and Israel; Ernst Andrea Scherz; Andrea Kracht, proprietor of Baur au Lac; and Andrea Scherz, the LHW’s sixth chairman, appointed in 2022. Scherz, son of previous chairman Ernst Andrea Scherz, is proprietor and general manager of his family’s hotel, Gstaad Palace.

=== Leadership ===
LHW president and CEO Ted Teng stepped down in April 2019 after leading the organization for a decade. Shannon Knapp, then serving as senior vice president and chief marketing officer, was named interim CEO before being named the permanent president and CEO in October 2019.

== Recognition ==
LHW’s member properties have been recognized with various awards, including: Travel + Leisure World’s Best Awards, the Condé Nast Traveler Triple Crown, Condé Nast Traveler Readers’ Choice Awards, and Michelin Keys.

== Hotels in LHW ==
Hotels that belong or have belonged to the LHW collection include:

=== Asia ===
- The Imperial New Delhi, India
- Imperial Hotel, Japan
- Soori Penang, Malaysia
- Imperial Hotel, Japan
- Nihi Rote & Hospitality Academy, Indonesia

=== Europe ===
- Ritz Paris, France
- Gleneagles Hotel, Scotland
- Portrait Milano, Italy
- Hotel Metropole Monte-Carlo, Monte-Carlo
- Palacio de Los Angeles, Spain
- Château la Commaraine, Hotel Spa & Cuverie, France
- Casa J.K. Roma, Italy
- Na Praia, Portugal

=== North America ===
- The Lowell, USA
- The Greenwich, USA
- The Rittenhouse, USA
- The Huntington Hotel, USA
- Recess Hotel & Club, USA

=== South America ===
- Chable Yucatán, Mexico
