= Monte Carlo =

Quarter and ward of Monaco

Monte Carlo Monte-Carlo (French) Munte Carlu (Monégasque)
- Quarter and ward
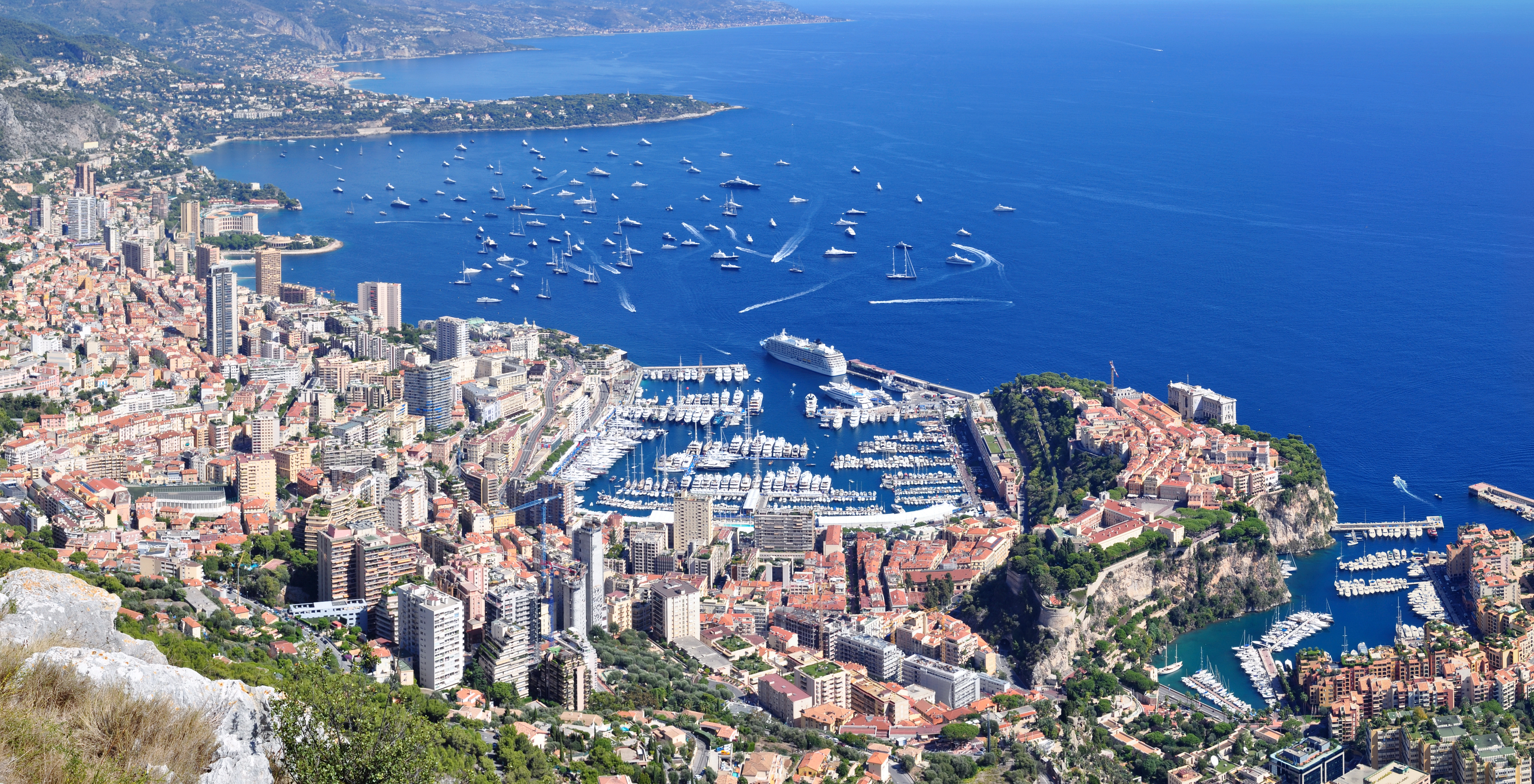

- Monte Carlo in Monaco (ward shown)

- Location in relation to Europe
- Coordinates: 43°44′23″N 7°25′38″E
- Country: Monaco
- Established: 1 June 1866

Government
  - Type: Principality
  - Prince of Monaco: Albert II

Area
  - Urban: 0.281 km^{2} (0.108 sq mi)

Population
  - Quarter and ward: 15,200 (in the quarter); 3,500 (in the ward)
- Postcode: 98000

Monte Carlo (/ˌmɒnti ˈkɑːrloʊ/ MON-tee KAR-loh; Italian: [ˈmonte ˈkarlo]; French: Monte-Carlo [mɔ̃te kaʁlo] or colloquially Monte-Carl [mɔ̃te kaʁl]; Monégasque: Munte Carlu, Ligurian: [ˈmuŋte ˈkaɾlu]; lit. 'Mount Charles') is an official administrative area of Monaco, specifically the ward of Monte Carlo/Spélugues. Informally, the name also refers to a larger district, the Monte Carlo Quarter (corresponding to the former municipality of Monte Carlo), which besides Monte Carlo/Spélugues also includes the wards of La Rousse/Saint Roman, Larvotto/Bas Moulins and Saint Michel. The permanent population of the ward of Monte Carlo is about 3,500, while that of the quarter is about 15,000. Monaco has four traditional quarters; from west to east they are Fontvieille (the newest), Monaco-Ville (the oldest), La Condamine, and Monte Carlo.

Monte Carlo is situated on a prominent escarpment at the base of the Maritime Alps along the French Riviera. Near the quarter's western end is the "world-famous Place du Casino, the gambling center ... that has made Monte Carlo an international byword for the extravagant display and reckless dispersal of wealth". It is also the location of the Hôtel de Paris, Café de Paris and Salle Garnier (the casino theatre which is the home of the Opéra de Monte-Carlo). The quarter's eastern part includes the community of Larvotto with Monaco's only public beach, as well as its new convention center (the Grimaldi Forum), and the Monte-Carlo Bay Hotel & Resort. At the quarter's eastern border, one crosses into the French town of Beausoleil (sometimes referred to as Monte-Carlo-Supérieur), and 8 kilometres (5 mi) to its east is the western border of Italy.

== History ==
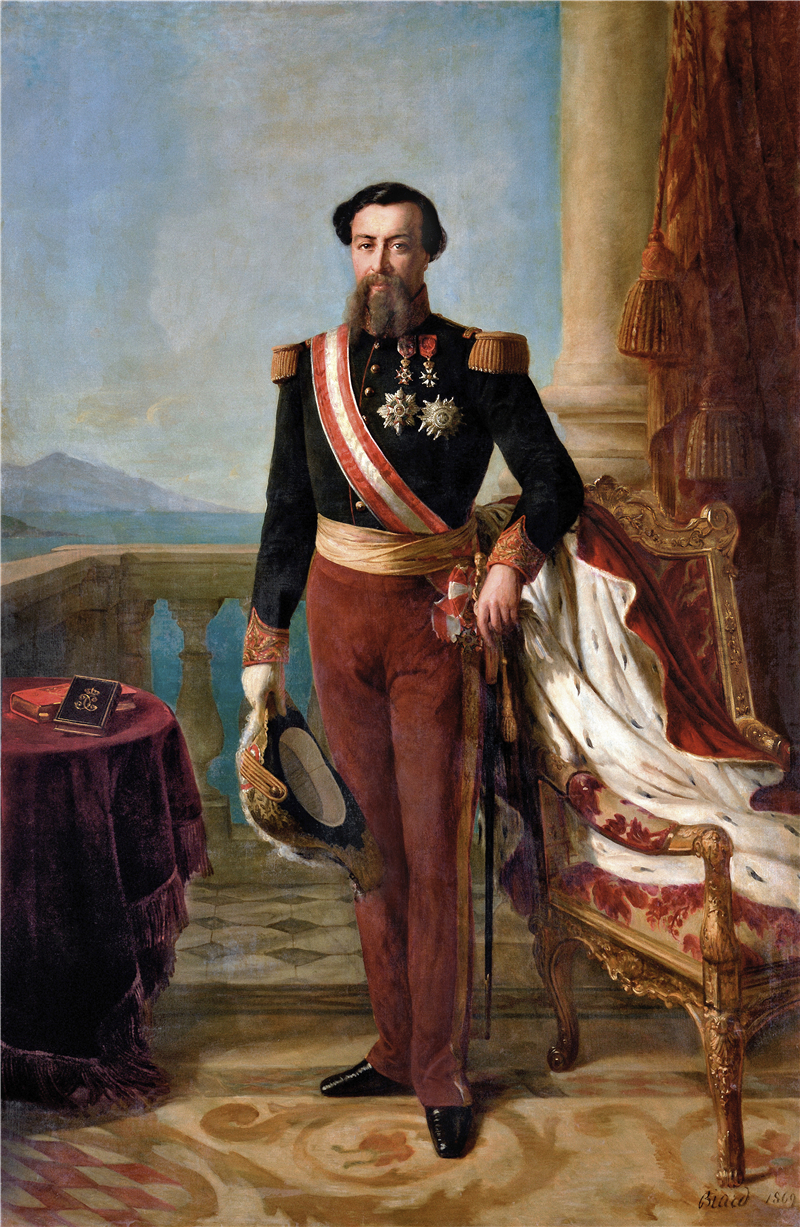
Charles III of Monaco was responsible for turning the Monte Carlo district and Monaco into a thriving town.

In 1856, Charles III of Monaco granted a concession to Napoleon Langlois and Albert Aubert to establish a sea-bathing facility for the treatment of various diseases, and to build a German-style casino.

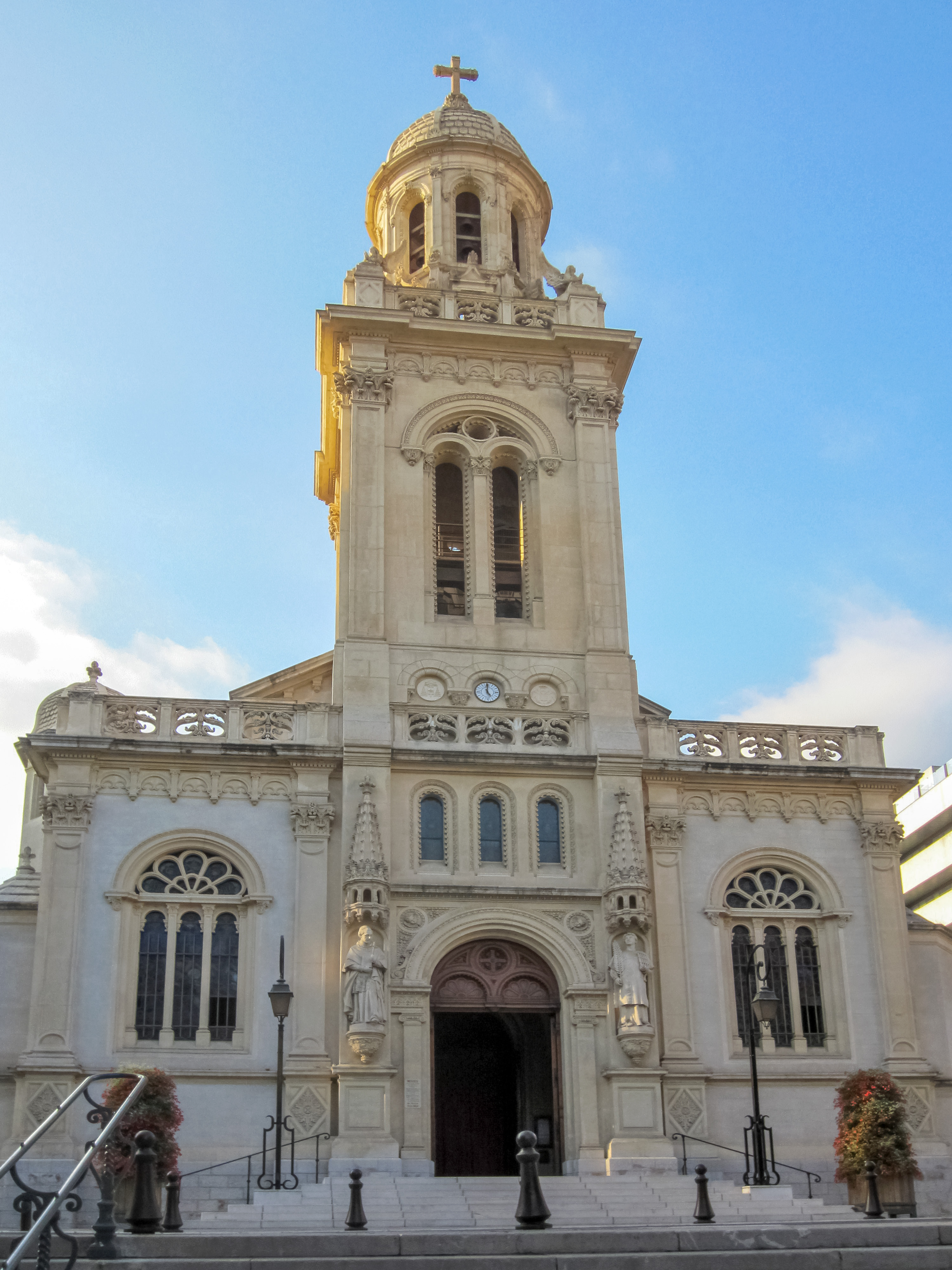
St Charles Church, Monte Carlo

The initial casino opened in La Condamine in 1862 but was unsuccessful. It relocated several times before reaching its present location in the "Les Spélugues" (The Caves) area of Monte Carlo. Success came slowly, largely because Monaco was inaccessible from much of Europe. The railway, installed in 1868, brought with it an influx of people, and Monte Carlo grew in wealth.

Saint-Charles Church on Monte Carlo's Avenue Sainte-Charles was completed in 1883. It was restored in its centenary year.

The municipality of Monte Carlo was created in 1911, when the constitution divided the principality of Monaco into three municipalities. Monte Carlo encompassed the existing neighborhoods of La Rousse/Saint Roman, Larvotto/Bas Moulins, and Saint Michel. The municipalities merged in 1917, after accusations that the government used them to "divide and conquer". Since then, they became wards. Today, Monaco is divided into 9 wards, which are grouped into 4 quartiers.

The quarter of Monte Carlo was served by tramways from 1898 to 1931. It linked all parts of Monaco (see transportation in Monaco). In 2003 a new cruise ship pier was completed in the harbour at Monte Carlo.

== Geography ==
Monte Carlo has an area of 28.14 hectares (0.28 square kilometers or 69.19 acres) and faces the Mediterranean Sea, bordered to the west by Ravin de Sainte-Dévote and La Condamine, and to the east by La Rousse and Larvotto.

=== Climate ===
Monte Carlo has a hot-summer Mediterranean climate (Köppen climate classification: Csa). As a result, it has hot, dry summers and mild, rainy winters.

Climate data for Monte Carlo, Monaco
| Month | Jan | Feb | Mar | Apr | May | Jun | Jul | Aug | Sep | Oct | Nov | Dec | Year |
|---|---|---|---|---|---|---|---|---|---|---|---|---|---|
| Mean daily maximum °C (°F) | 12.5 (54.5) | 13.1 (55.6) | 14.5 (58.1) | 16.7 (62.1) | 19.8 (67.6) | 23.3 (73.9) | 26.4 (79.5) | 26.6 (79.9) | 24.2 (75.6) | 20.8 (69.4) | 16.2 (61.2) | 13.5 (56.3) | 19.0 (66.2) |
| Daily mean °C (°F) | 8.7 (47.7) | 9.4 (48.9) | 10.9 (51.6) | 13.2 (55.8) | 16.4 (61.5) | 19.9 (67.8) | 22.9 (73.2) | 23.0 (73.4) | 20.5 (68.9) | 17.0 (62.6) | 12.4 (54.3) | 9.6 (49.3) | 15.3 (59.5) |
| Mean daily minimum °C (°F) | 4.9 (40.8) | 5.6 (42.1) | 7.2 (45.0) | 9.7 (49.5) | 13.0 (55.4) | 16.4 (61.5) | 19.3 (66.7) | 19.3 (66.7) | 16.9 (62.4) | 13.2 (55.8) | 8.6 (47.5) | 5.7 (42.3) | 11.7 (53.1) |
| Average precipitation mm (inches) | 82.7 (3.26) | 76.4 (3.01) | 70.5 (2.78) | 62.2 (2.45) | 48.6 (1.91) | 36.9 (1.45) | 15.6 (0.61) | 31.3 (1.23) | 54.4 (2.14) | 108.2 (4.26) | 104.2 (4.10) | 77.5 (3.05) | 768.5 (30.26) |
| Average precipitation days | 6.8 | 6.4 | 6.1 | 6.3 | 5.2 | 4.1 | 1.9 | 3.1 | 4.0 | 5.8 | 7.0 | 6.0 | 62.7 |
| Mean monthly sunshine hours | 148.8 | 152.6 | 201.5 | 228.0 | 269.7 | 297.0 | 341.0 | 306.9 | 240.0 | 204.6 | 156.0 | 142.6 | 2,668.7 |
| Percentage possible sunshine | 53 | 55 | 54 | 58 | 58 | 66 | 73 | 71 | 67 | 60 | 52 | 51 | 60 |
Source 1: Hong Kong Observatory
Source 2: Weather Atlas (possible sunshine)

Climate data for Monaco
| Month | Jan | Feb | Mar | Apr | May | Jun | Jul | Aug | Sep | Oct | Nov | Dec | Year |
|---|---|---|---|---|---|---|---|---|---|---|---|---|---|
| Mean daily maximum °C (°F) | 12.3 (54.1) | 12.5 (54.5) | 14.0 (57.2) | 16.1 (61.0) | 19.4 (66.9) | 23.0 (73.4) | 25.8 (78.4) | 25.9 (78.6) | 23.8 (74.8) | 19.9 (67.8) | 16.1 (61.0) | 13.4 (56.1) | 18.5 (65.3) |
| Mean daily minimum °C (°F) | 8.1 (46.6) | 8.2 (46.8) | 9.6 (49.3) | 11.6 (52.9) | 14.8 (58.6) | 18.5 (65.3) | 21.2 (70.2) | 21.5 (70.7) | 19.3 (66.7) | 15.6 (60.1) | 11.9 (53.4) | 9.3 (48.7) | 14.1 (57.4) |
| Average precipitation days | 5.9 | 5.2 | 6.7 | 6.0 | 5.6 | 2.8 | 1.3 | 2.5 | 4.5 | 7.5 | 7.7 | 6.8 | 62.5 |
Source: Monaco website

Climate data for Monte Carlo
| Month | Jan | Feb | Mar | Apr | May | Jun | Jul | Aug | Sep | Oct | Nov | Dec | Year |
|---|---|---|---|---|---|---|---|---|---|---|---|---|---|
| Average sea temperature °C (°F) | 13.4 (56.2) | 13.0 (55.5) | 13.4 (56.1) | 14.6 (58.4) | 18.0 (64.3) | 21.8 (71.3) | 23.1 (73.6) | 23.6 (74.4) | 22.2 (71.9) | 19.6 (67.2) | 17.4 (63.3) | 14.9 (58.9) | 17.9 (64.3) |
| Mean daily daylight hours | 9.0 | 10.0 | 12.0 | 13.0 | 15.0 | 15.0 | 15.0 | 14.0 | 12.0 | 11.0 | 10.0 | 9.0 | 12.1 |
| Average Ultraviolet index | 1 | 2 | 4 | 5 | 7 | 8 | 8 | 7 | 5 | 3 | 2 | 1 | 4.4 |
Source: Weather Atlas

== Sport ==
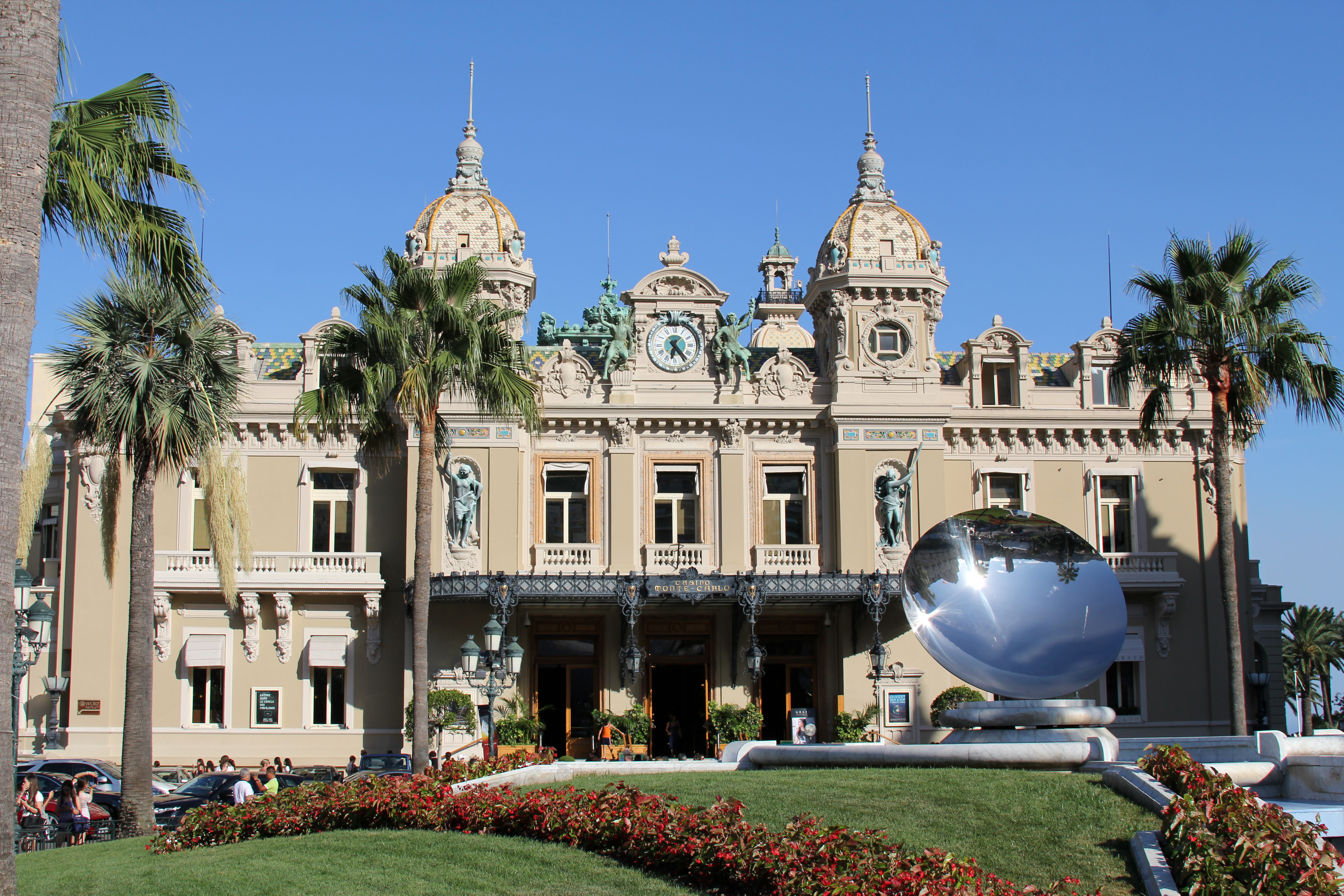
Monte Carlo Casino

Monte Carlo is a namesake for a ATP Masters 1000 tennis tournament during the clay court season, usually played during the end of March through mid to late April. Although the Monte Carlo Masters tennis tournament is billed as taking place in the community, its actual location is in the adjacent French commune of Roquebrune-Cap-Martin.

From motosports, Monte Carlo is host to most of the Circuit de Monaco, on which the Formula One Monaco Grand Prix takes place. The Monte Carlo Rally is one of the longest running and most respected car rallies; from 1973 to 2008 and again from 2012, it marks the start of World Rally Championship season, having also served as the curtain-raiser for the Intercontinental Rally Challenge between 2009 and 2011. The rally, however, takes place outside the Monte Carlo quarter and is run mostly on French roads.

The community also hosts world championship boxing bouts, the European Poker Tour Grand Final, the World Backgammon Championship as well as the Monaco International Auto Show (Fr: Salon International de l'Automobile de Monaco), and other events.

== Tourism ==
Monte Carlo has been visited by royalty as well as the public and movie stars for decades. Monte Carlo is one of Europe's leading tourist resorts, although many of the key tourist destinations are in other parts of Monaco, including such attractions as Monaco Cathedral, the Napoleon Museum, the Oceanographic Museum and aquarium, and the Prince's Palace, all of which are in Monaco-Ville.

=== Salle Garnier ===
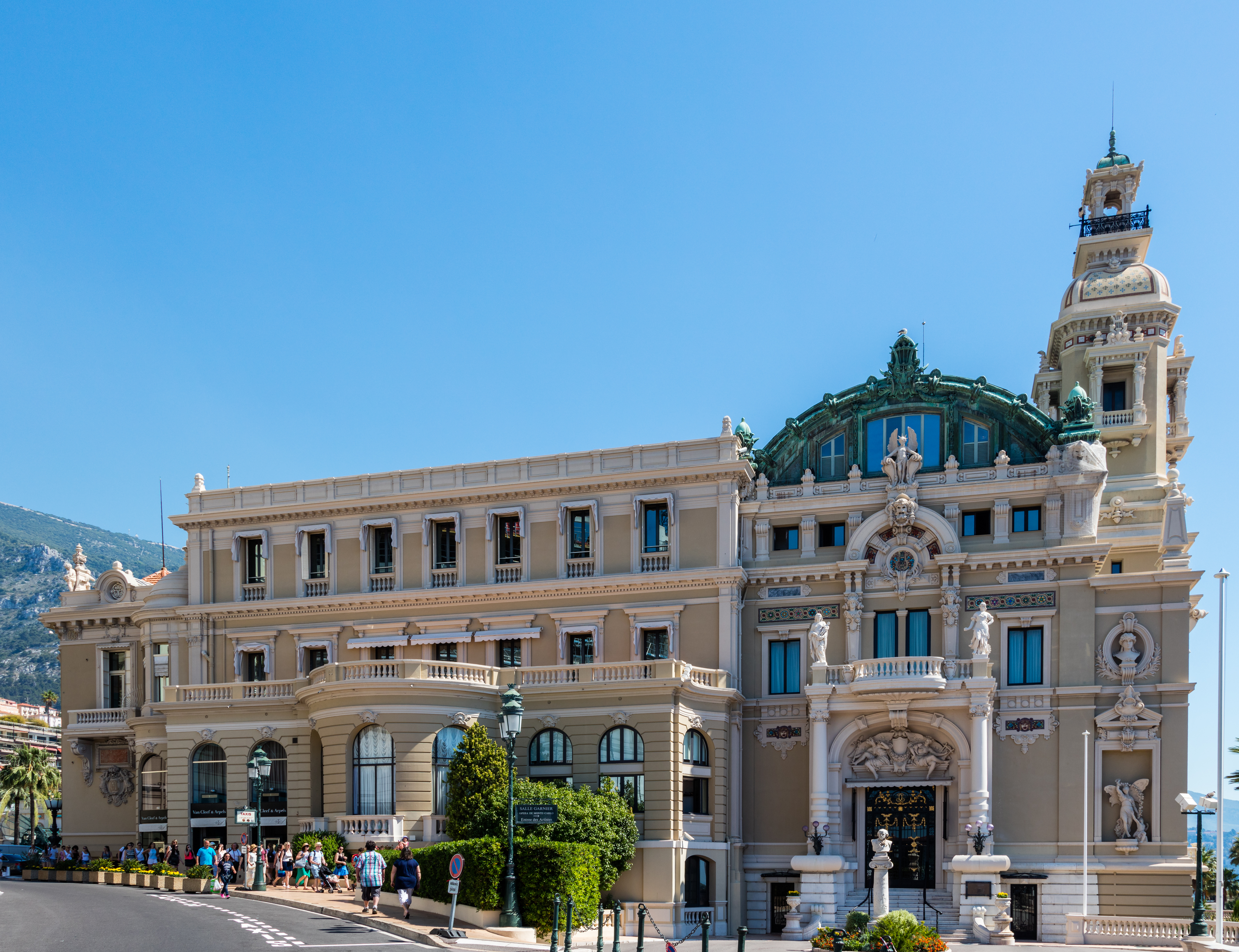
Entrance to the Salle Garnier, home of the Opéra de Monte-Carlo

The Opéra de Monte-Carlo or Salle Garnier was built to designs of the architect Charles Garnier, who also designed the Paris opera house now known as the Palais Garnier. Although much smaller, the Salle Garnier is very similar in style with decorations in red and gold, and frescoes and sculptures all around the auditorium. It was inaugurated on 25 January 1879 with a performance by Sarah Bernhardt dressed as a nymph. The first opera performed there was Robert Planquette's Le Chevalier Gaston on 8 February 1879, and that was followed by three more in the first season.

Other famous twentieth-century singers to appear at Monte Carlo included Titta Ruffo, Geraldine Farrar, Mary Garden, Tito Schipa, Beniamino Gigli, Claudia Muzio, Georges Thill, and Lily Pons.

=== Hôtel de Paris ===
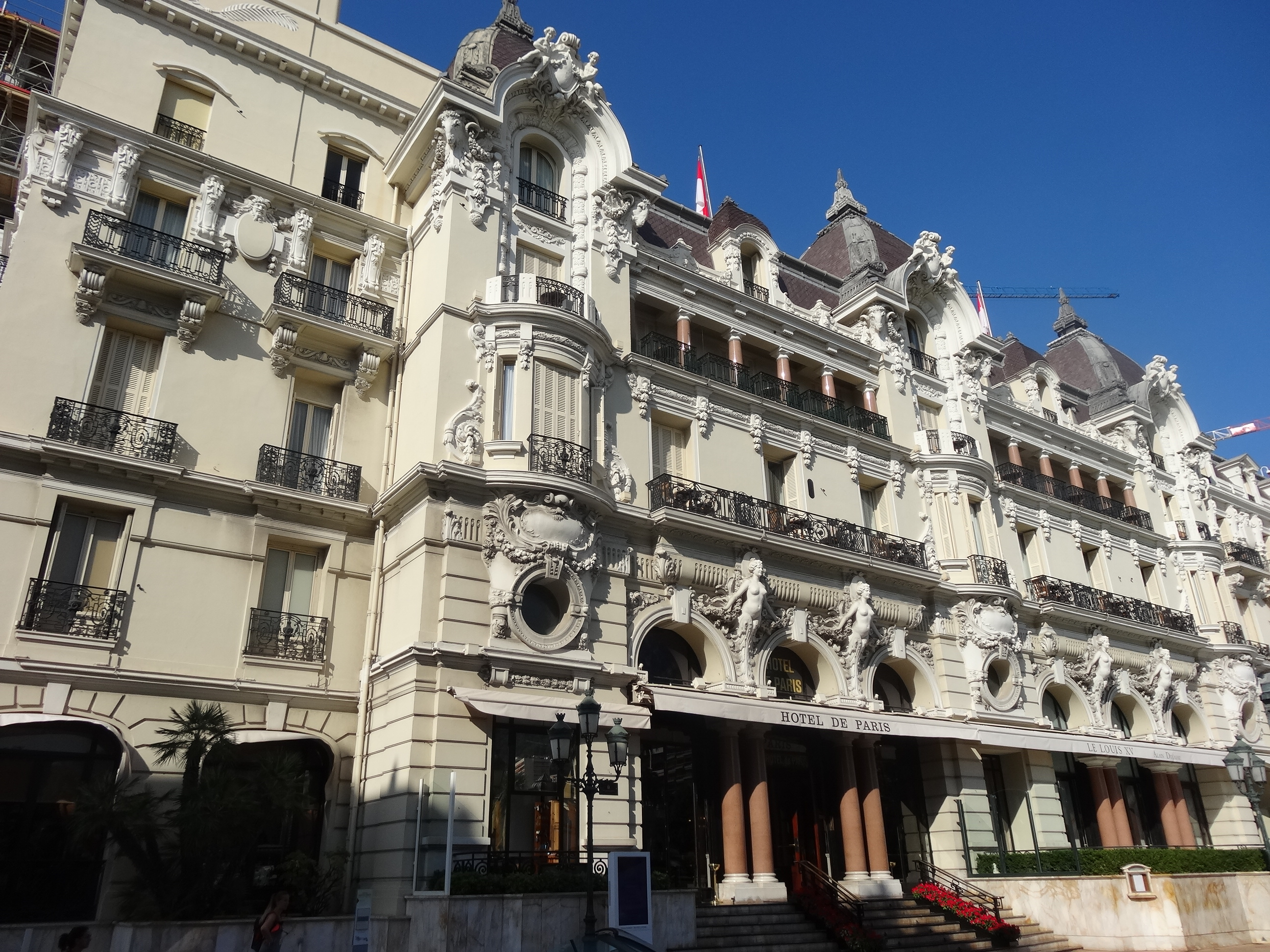
Hôtel de Paris Monte-Carlo

The Hôtel de Paris, established in 1864 by Charles III of Monaco, is located on the west side of the Place du Casino in the heart of Monte Carlo. It belongs to the Société des bains de mer de Monaco (SBM), and is part of the elite Palace Grand Hotels in Monaco with the Hotel Hermitage, the Monte-Carlo Beach Hotel, Monte-Carlo Bay Hotel & Resort, the Hotel Metropole and Fairmont hotel.

The hotel has 106 rooms divided into four groups based on type of view, decoration and luxury. The Exclusive City View offers 20 rooms, the Superior Courtyard has 29 large rooms, the Exclusive Sea View 59 and the Exclusive Casino has six.

Additionally, there are 74 suites and junior suites which are grouped similarly, offering more luxury than the rooms. There are single and double suites as well as courtyard junior suites and Sea/Casino Junior suites. There is also one Presidential suite.

In October 2014, a renovation project began, to create a garden courtyard, add a new spa, fitness and pool area, exceptional suites, and a "rooftop villa" with a private garden and pool.

== Cultural depictions ==
Monte Carlo has been the setting of many films, books, television shows, and video games.

=== Films ===
- Foolish Wives (1922), although it was filmed in California.
- Rebecca (1940), an Alfred Hitchcock film with Monte Carlo and its famous casino as the setting, starring Laurence Olivier and Joan Fontaine.
- To Catch a Thief (1954), an Alfred Hitchcock film with Monte Carlo and its famous casino as the setting, starring Cary Grant and Grace Kelly, the future Princess Grace of Monaco.
- Grand Prix (1966), starring James Garner, Eva Marie Saint, and Yves Montand.
- Monte Carlo or Bust! (1969) also known by its American title, Those Daring Young Men in Their Jaunty Jalopies starring Tony Curtis and Terry Thomas.
- Herbie Goes to Monte Carlo (1977), starring Dean Jones and Don Knotts.
- The James Bond films Never Say Never Again (1983), and GoldenEye (1995) feature the Monte Carlo Casino.
- A Ghost in Monte Carlo (1990), a Barbara Cartland TV movie starring Christopher Plummer, Oliver Reed and Lysette Anthony.
- Once Upon a Crime (1992) The plot revolves around a series of couples in Monte Carlo, Monaco.
- I Spy (2002), starring Eddie Murphy and Owen Wilson
- Iron Man 2 (2010) features the Monaco Grand Prix.
- Monte Carlo (2011), starring Selena Gomez, Leighton Meester, and Katie Cassidy
- The DreamWorks film, Madagascar 3: Europe's Most Wanted (2012), features the Monte Carlo Casino.
- Rebecca (2020), a Netflix production with Lily James, Armie Hammer and Kristin Scott Thomas as main characters.

=== Literature ===
- Monte Carlo is featured in Edith Wharton's novel The House of Mirth (1905) as a backdrop for the leisure activities of New York's upper class in the early 20th century.
- The first few chapters of the Gothic novel Rebecca (1938) are set in Monte Carlo.

• The climatic final scene in the legal thriller The Manipulator by Dan Buzzetta (Severn River Publishing, 2025) takes place in Port Hercules, the major deep water port of Monte Carlo.

=== Music ===
- The 1891 music hall song "The Man Who Broke the Bank at Monte Carlo", written by Fred Gilbert about a real life English trickster in Monte Carlo and popularised in 1892 by singer and comedian Charles Coborn.
- The Prince and Princess of Monte Carlo are characters in the Savoy opera The Grand Duke (1896) by Gilbert and Sullivan.
- Monte Carlo is an Edwardian musical comedy in two acts with a book by Sidney Carlton, music by Howard Talbot and lyrics by Harry Greenbank first performed in 1896.
- La Dame de Monte Carlo is a monologue for soprano and orchestra composed by Francis Poulenc in 1961 based on a poem from Jean Cocteau’s Théâtre de poche.
- "Monte Carlo Nights" is a song by Grover Washington Jr composed in 2001.
- "Goin' Down To Monte Carlo" is a song by Van Morrison composed in 2012.

=== Television ===
- The television series I Love Lucy had an episode set in Monte Carlo in 1956, Season 5, episode 25 "Lucy Goes to Monte Carlo".
- In the British private detective series, Randall and Hopkirk (Deceased), the eleventh episode, "The Ghost who Saved the Bank at Monte Carlo" (1969), is set in Monte Carlo.
- The Monte Carlo Show (1980-1985), a variety show hosted by Patrick Wayne.
- The Bold and the Beautiful series (1987–) featured a number of episodes filmed on location in the city in 2016 and 2017. It is the location for the annual Spencer Summit.

=== Video games ===
- The Gran Turismo series often features the Circuit de Monaco, albeit credited as "Côte d'Azur" and marked as being in France.
- The indie game Monaco: What's Yours is Mine
- The 1992 point-and-click game Indiana Jones and the Fate of Atlantis
- Various Formula One video games features the historic Circuit de Monaco.
- The Colin McRae Rally and DiRT series, as well as the World Rally Championship series, feature Monte Carlo as rally stages.
- James Bond 007: Blood Stone features a level set in Monte Carlo.

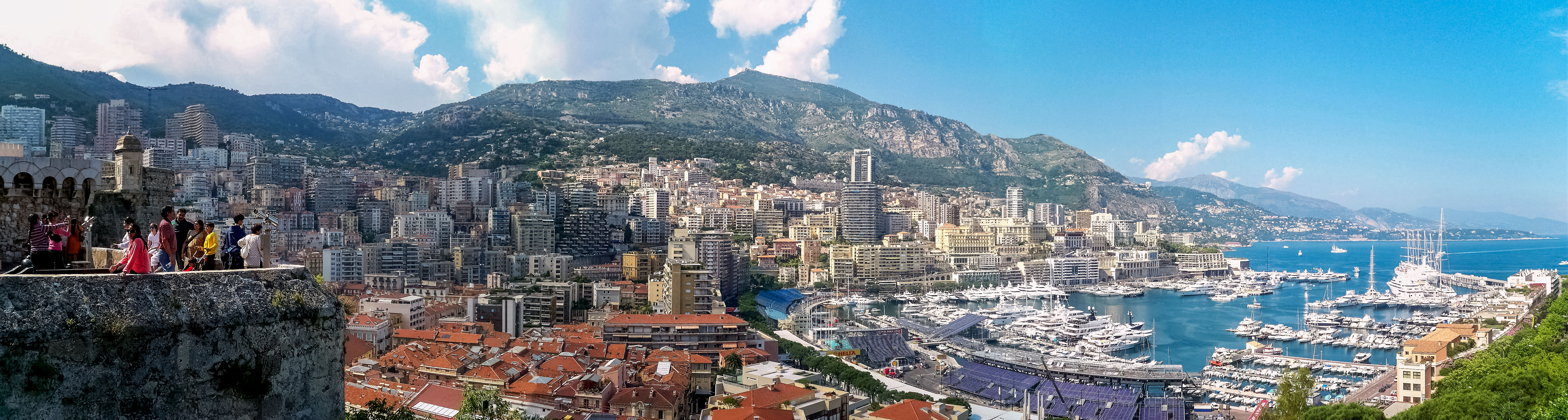
Panorama of La Condamine and Monte Carlo from the lookout near the Prince's Palace of Monaco in Monaco-Ville

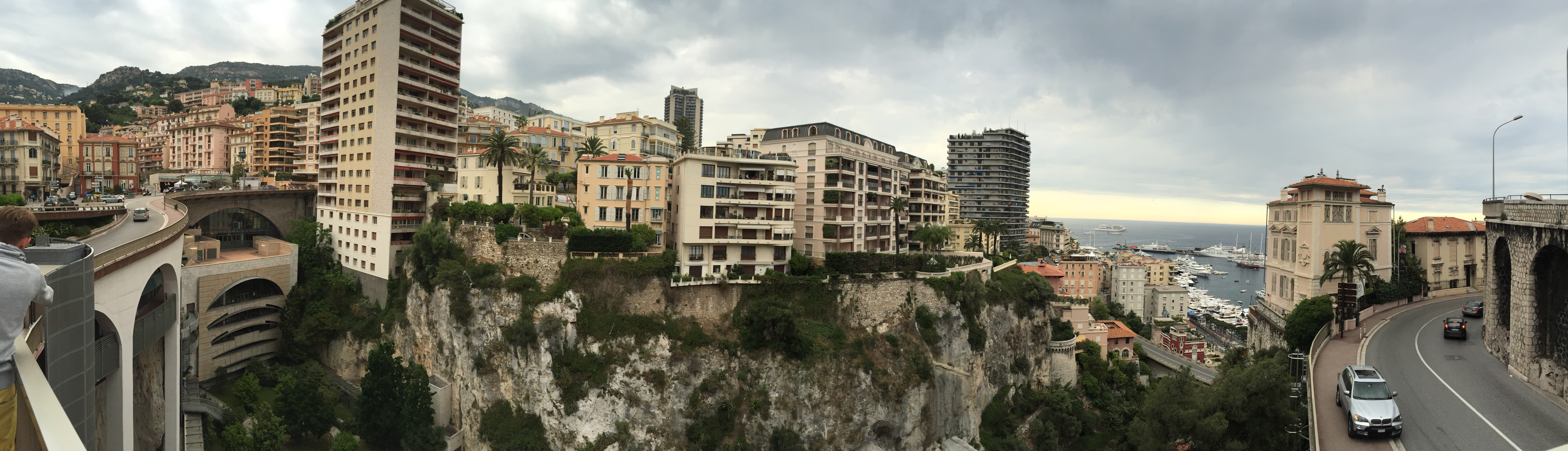
Monte Carlo city panorama from train station, May 2015

== Twin cities ==
Monaco's twin cities are:

| Ostend, Belgium since 1958 | Macau, China since 1992 | Lucciana, Corsica, France since 2009 | Campagna, Campania, Italy since 2015 |

== Notable people ==
Monte Carlo, being a part of Monaco tax haven, gathered a population of many notable foreign residents, including celebrities, businesspeople, and artists. It is home to many active and retired athletes, in particular Formula One drivers and tennis players.

- Alex Albon, Formula One driver
- Victoria Azarenka, tennis player
- Bono, singer
- Björn Borg, former tennis player
- Valtteri Bottas, Formula One driver
- Jenson Button, former Formula One driver
- Loris Capirossi, former MotoGP rider
- Jolanda Čeplak, former athlete
- Marin Čilić, tennis player
- David Coulthard, former Formula One driver
- Julian Cochran, classical composer
- Grigor Dimitrov, tennis player
- Novak Djokovic, tennis player
- Richard Dunne, former professional footballer
- Mohamed Al-Fayed, ex-Harrods owner
- Giancarlo Fisichella, former Formula One driver
- Matthew Goss, professional cyclist
- Philip Green, businessman
- Stelios Haji-Ioannou, businessman
- Lewis Hamilton, Formula One driver
- Daniela Hantuchová, former tennis player
- Justin Hayward, singer with the Moody Blues
- Justine Henin, former tennis player
- Markus Hipfl, former tennis player
- Dominik Hrbatý, former tennis player
- Hubert Hurkacz, tennis player
- Thor Hushovd, professional cyclist
- Eddie Jordan, former Formula One team owner
- Robert Kubica, former Formula One driver
- Karol Kučera, former tennis player
- Petra Kvitová, former tennis player
- Charles Leclerc, Formula One driver
- Gina Lollobrigida, actress
- Felipe Massa, former Formula One driver
- John McLaughlin, guitarist
- Andriy Medvedev, former tennis player
- Daniil Medvedev, tennis player
- Gian Carlo Menotti, classical composer
- Andreas Mikkelsen, WRC driver
- Thierry Neuville, WRC driver
- Helmut Newton, photographer
- Lando Norris, Formula One driver
- Mike Oldfield, musician
- Stefano Pessina, businessman
- Paula Radcliffe, athlete
- Milos Raonic, tennis player
- Jean-Raymond Boulle, businessman
- Daniel Ricciardo, former Formula One driver
- Cristiano Ronaldo, football player
- Keke Rosberg, former Formula One driver
- Nico Rosberg, former Formula One driver
- Marc Rosset, former tennis player
- Lucie Šafářová, tennis player
- Marat Safin, former tennis player
- Ayrton Senna (1960-1994), Formula One driver (Note: Senna lived in Monte Carlo and he never retired since he died at Imola in 1994.)
- David Shilling, milliner
- Matteo Berrettini, tennis player
- Jannik Sinner, tennis player
- Robin Söderling, tennis player
- Ringo Starr, drummer with the Beatles
- Bernard Tomic, tennis player
- Edwina Tops-Alexander, equestrian rider
- Valentin Vacherot, tennis player
- Stoffel Vandoorne, former Formula One driver
- Max Verstappen, Formula One driver
- Yanina Wickmayer, former tennis player
- Jeff Wooller, accountant
- Caroline Wozniacki, tennis player
- Alexander Zverev, tennis player
- Mischa Zverev, former tennis player

== Gallery ==
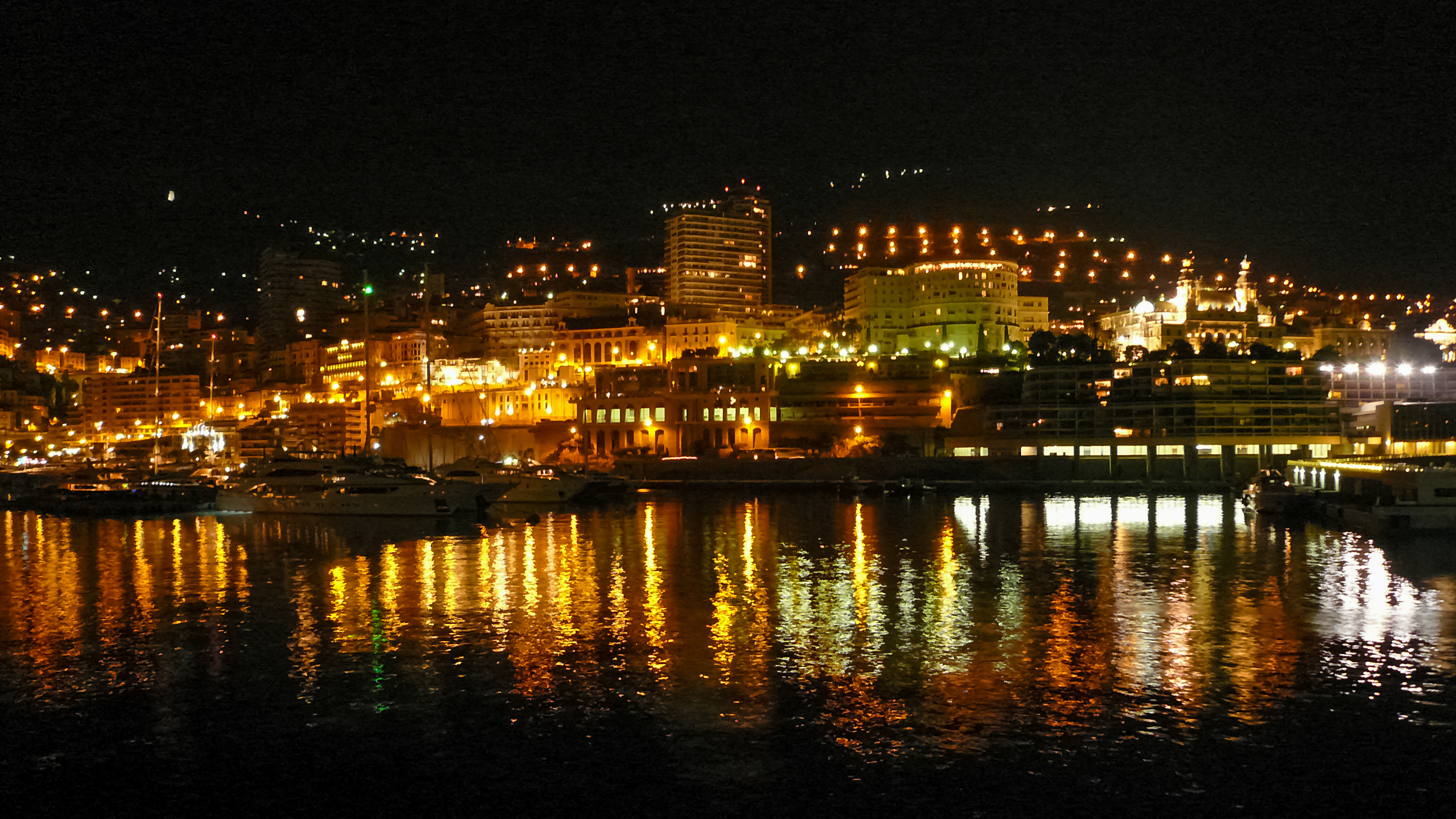
Monte-Carlo at night from the pier

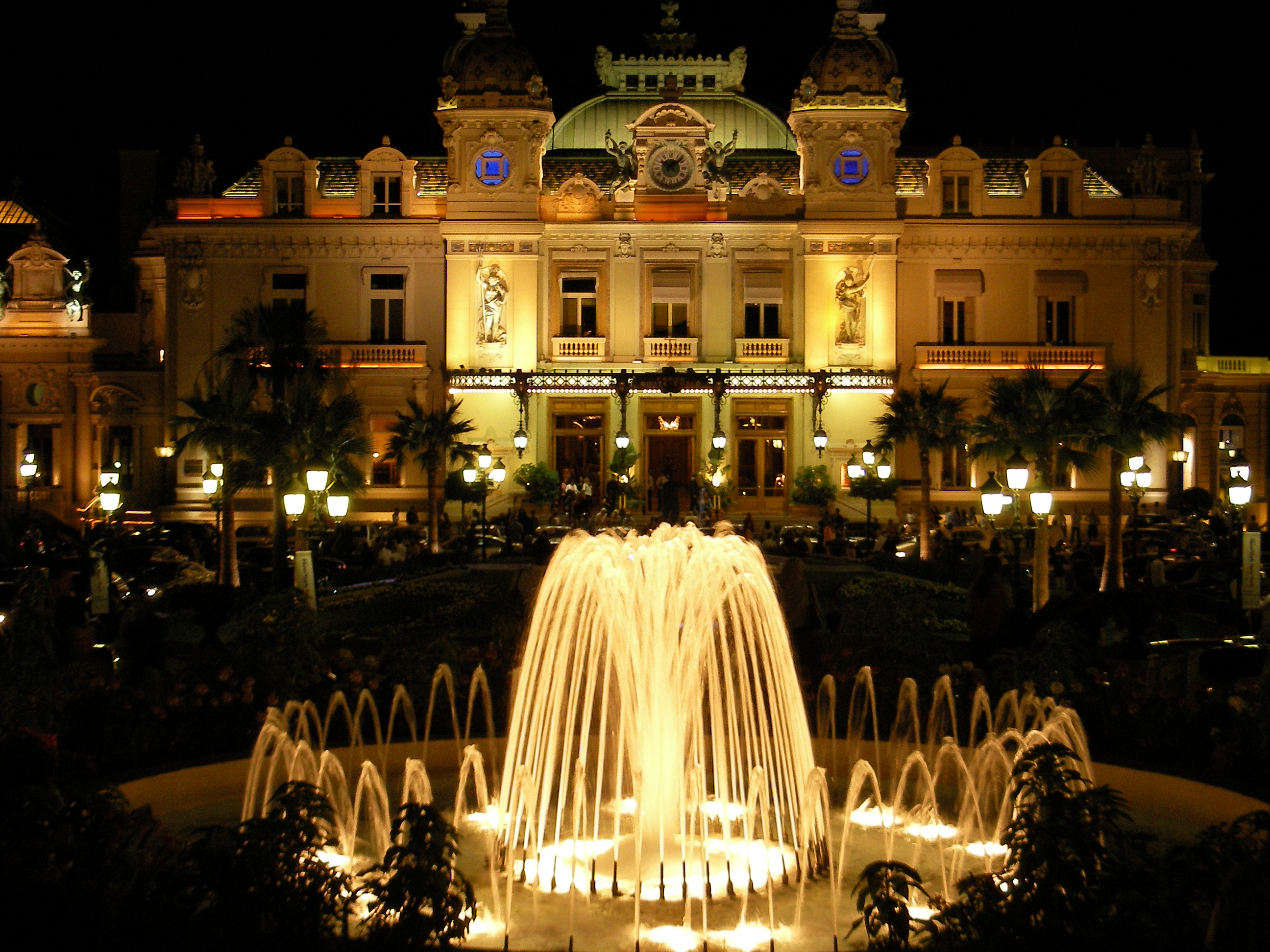
Place du Casino, Monte Carlo

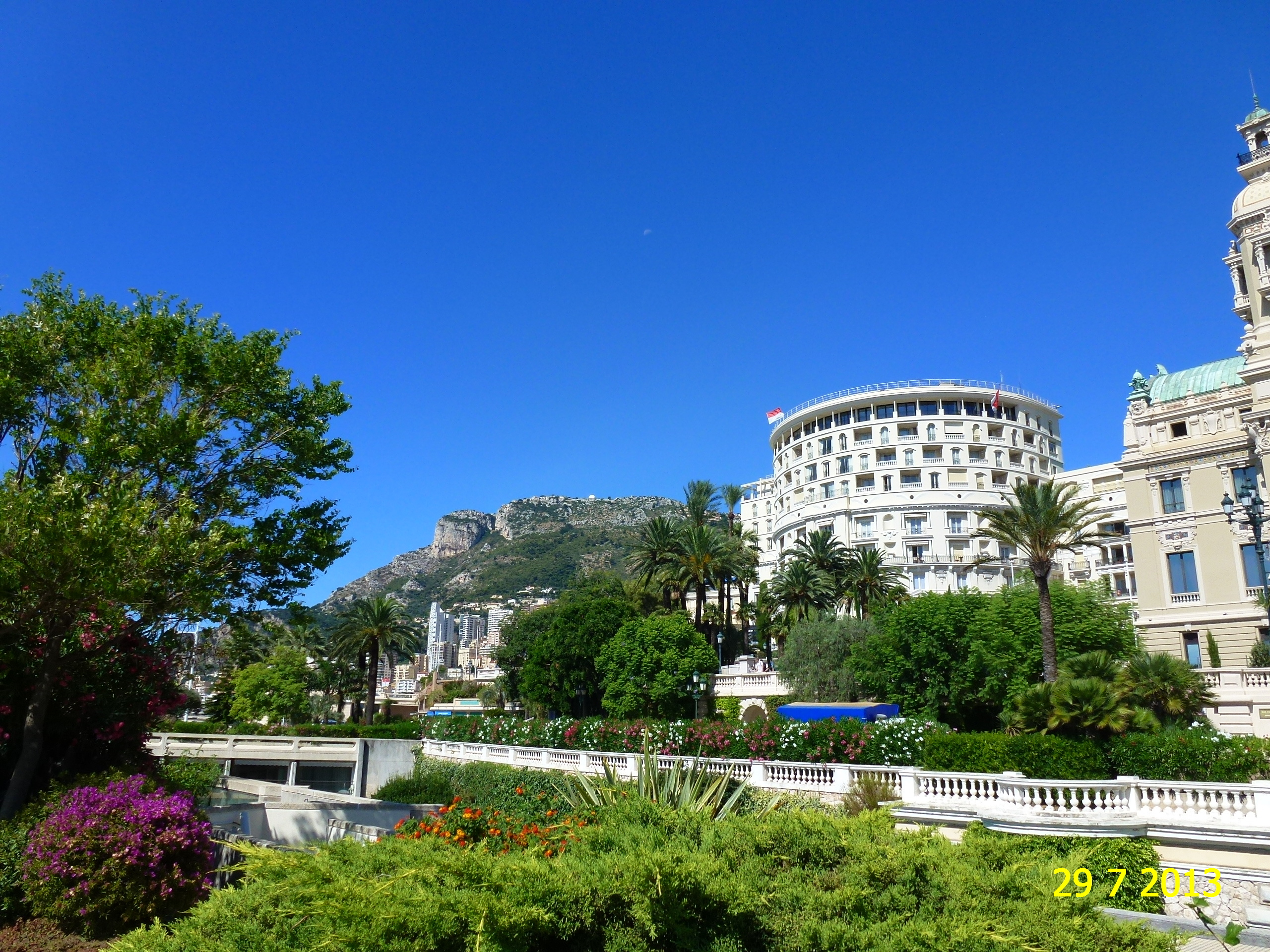
Hotel de Paris, Monaco

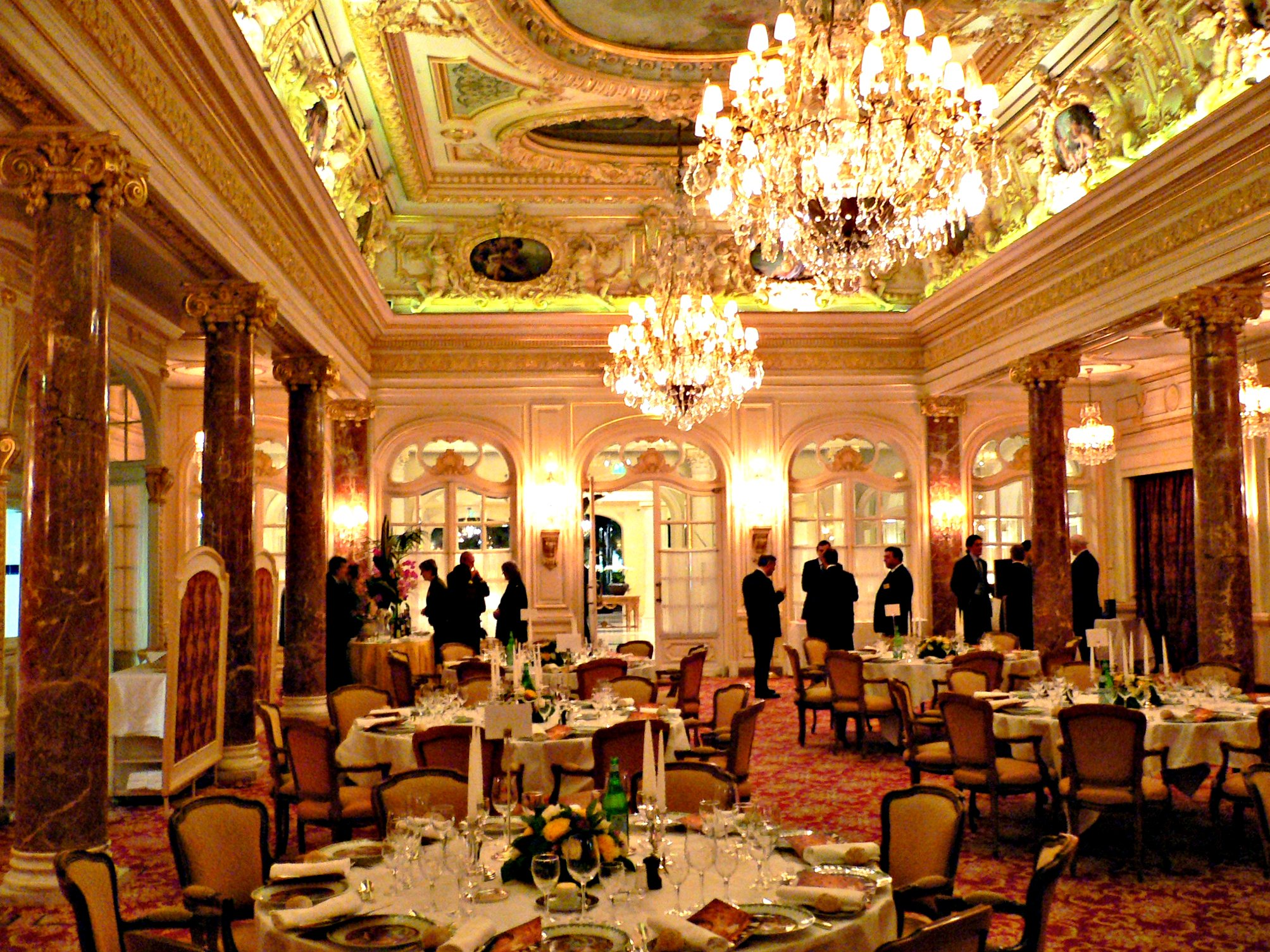
Interior of Hotel Hermitage Monte Carlo

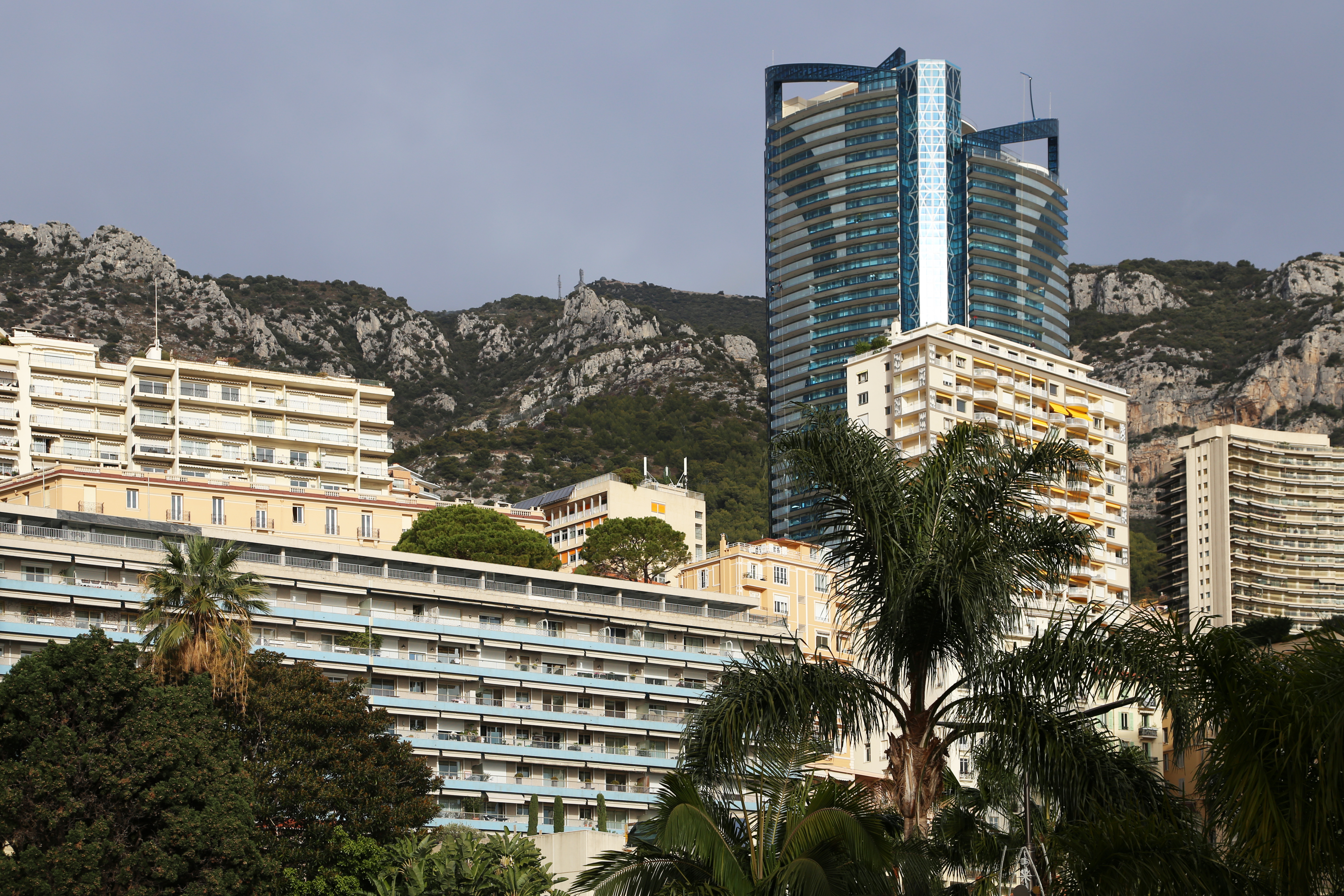
Buildings

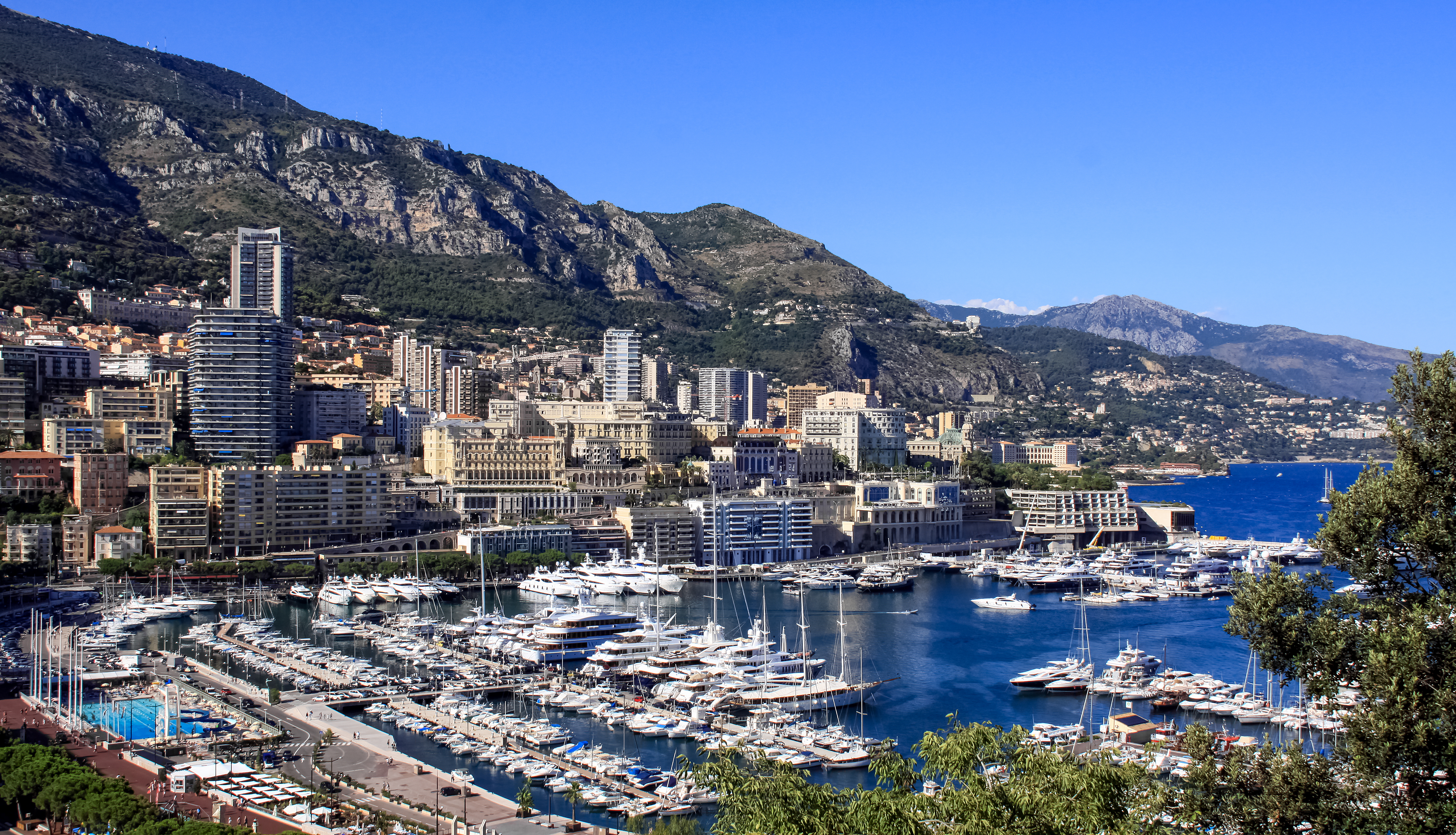
Monte Carlo

== See also ==
- Chevrolet Monte Carlo – a two-door coupé produced by Chevrolet for six generations
- Municipality of Monaco
- Monaco Heliport
- Monte Carlo method
- Monte Carlo Resort and Casino – hotel and casino in Paradise, Nevada, on the Las Vegas Strip.
- Radio Monte Carlo
- Télé Monte Carlo
