= Avraham Elimelech Firer =

Israeli rabbi and founder of Ezra LeMarpeh

- אלימלך פירר
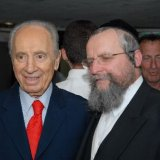
- Firer (right) pictured with former Israeli PM Shimon Peres, 2011
- Born: 1954 (age 71–72); Bnei Brak, Israel
- Occupations: Rabbi, social activist
- Organization: Ezra LeMarpeh
- Spouse: Feige (Tzipora) Firer
- Children: 10
- Awards: Israel Prize (1997); Honorary Doctorate from the Weizmann Institute (2002); Honorary Doctorate from the University of Haifa (2008); Begin Prize; Rambam Award (2010)

Avraham Elimelech Firer (Hebrew: אלימלך פירר; born 1954) is an Israeli rabbi. He is chairman and founder of Ezra LeMarpeh, a nonprofit organization established in 1979 that provides medical assistance to the needy.

== Biography ==
Avraham Elimelech Firer was born in Bnei Brak, the fifth of nine children. His father, a teacher, immigrated from Galicia. He is married to Feige (Tzipora), a kindergarten teacher, with whom he has ten children.

== Social activism career ==
Firer matches sick people with the best hospitals, physicians and treatments available for their conditions, in Israel and abroad.

His organization, Ezra Lamarpeh, operates a fleet of ambulances, a special ICU for flying patients abroad, Home Care Network that cares for cancer stricken children and a Video-Conference System for international medical sessions. Firer is an ordained rabbi.

According to Harvard Medical School's Dr. Ivo Janko, Firer and his organization provide integrated services unparalleled in the world.

The body of judges who awarded the Israel Prize to Firer described his tireless work and the inspiration offered by his "boundless energy, patience, cheerfulness and serenity, which are essential conditions for working with the sick, the elderly and the needy, who more than anything else need emotional support."

Ezra LeMarpeh assists anyone who turns to it for help, without discrimination: Jews and non-Jews, religious and secular. Doctors accept Firer's suggestions and referrals, and his office is open for consultation and advice at all hours of the day and night. Firer's work is purely voluntary.

== Awards and recognition ==
In 1997, Rabbi Firer was awarded the Israel Prize, for his special contribution to society and the State of Israel.

In 2002, Rabbi Firer was awarded an Honorary Doctorate from the Weizmann Institute. In 2008, he was awarded an Honorary Doctorate from the University of Haifa.

On 10 June 2010, at the Rambam Summit, Prof. Rafi Beyar, Director of Rambam Health Care Campus in Haifa, honored Rabbi Firer with the Rambam Award 2010.

Firer is also the recipient of the Begin Prize.

== See also ==
- Health care in Israel
- List of Israel Prize recipients
