= Douglas Frenkel =

Douglas Norman Frenkel
- Education: University of Pennsylvania (B.S. in Economics; 1968); University of Pennsylvania Law School (J.D.; 1972)
- Occupation: Law professor
- Employer: University of Pennsylvania Law School
- Notable work: The Practice of Mediation: A Video-Integrated Text (with James Stark)
- Title: Morris Shuster Practice Professor of Law
- Spouse: Marlene Weinstein

Douglas Norman Frenkel is the Morris Shuster Practice Professor of Law at the University of Pennsylvania Law School.

== Education and personal life ==
Frenkel graduated from the University of Pennsylvania with a B.S. in Economics in 1968, and from the University of Pennsylvania Law School with a J.D. in 1972. He is married to Marlene Weinstein.

== Legal career ==
Frenkel was a law clerk to Judge Theodore Spaulding, Superior Court of Pennsylvania, from 1972-73. From 1973 to 1978 he was a Staff Managing Attorney for Community Legal Services in Philadelphia, Pennsylvania.

He is the Morris Shuster Practice Professor of Law at the University of Pennsylvania Law School, having taught at the law school since 1978. Frenkel teaches Mediation, Professional Responsibility, Interviewing, Counseling and Negotiation, and Family Law.

Frenkel was the Director of the Gittis Center for Clinical Legal Studies from 1980 to 2008. He specializes in alternative dispute resolution generally, and especially in mediation. His multi-media book, The Practice of Mediation: A Video-Integrated Text (3rd ed., 2018, with James Stark) is a law school skills text. Frenkel's other major area of expertise is legal ethics, and he was a founding faculty member of the Law School’s Center on Professionalism. Among the articles that he has written are "Improving Lawyers' Judgment: Is Mediation Training De-Biasing?" (with James Stark), 21 Harvard Negotiation Law Review 1 (2015); "Changing Minds: The Work of Mediators and Empirical Studies of Persuasion" (with James Stark; Honorable Mention in the 2016 International Institute for Conflict Prevention & Resolution Annual Awards), 28 Ohio State J. on Dispute Res. 263 (2013); and "On Trying to Teach Judgment," 12 Legal Education Review 19 (2001).
