= Aaron Frenkel =

Israeli businessman

- אהרון פרנקל
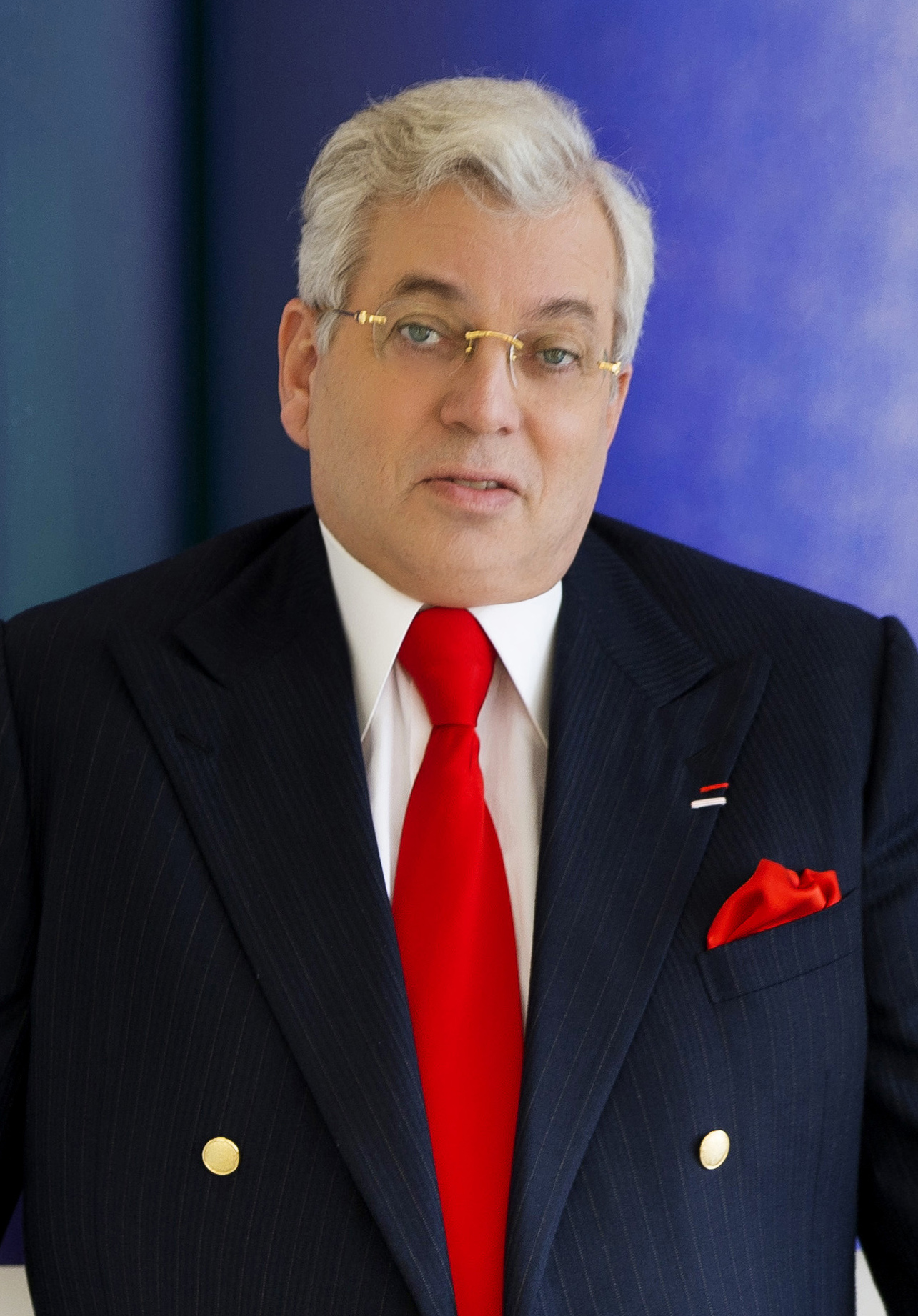
- Frenkel during interview with The Jerusalem Post, Jan 2016
- Born: September 9, 1957 (age 69); Bnei Brak, Israel
- Occupations: Businessman, investor
- Spouse: Maja Ruth Frenkel
- Children: 5

Aaron G. Frenkel (Hebrew: אהרון פרנקל; born September 9, 1957, in Israel) is an Israeli businessman and investor in the energy, real estate, defense and aviation sectors.

== Career ==
=== Early career ===
Frenkel began his business career as an agent for IAI.

=== Europe ===
Since the 1980s, Frenkel has been the owner of the Loyd's Group, a holding company that has invested in real estate and the aerospace industry.

Frenkel established the Loyd's Group as a representative of The Boeing Company, Airbus SE, Gulfstream Aerospace, Agusta, Embraer and others in the Central & Eastern European market.

Frenkel is the owner of Lilium, which owns the LIM Center, a skyscraper in Warsaw, which houses a Marriott Hotel until 2024 and a Presidential Hotel since 2024.

=== Israel and Worldwide ===
in 2018-2019, Frenkel purchased about 20% of the drone company Aeronautics Defense Systems, and in 2019 he sold his share to Rafael Advanced Defense Systems.

Frenkel acquired control of Gav-Yam in 2020. He sold his stake to the Property & Building Corp in December 2021 at a value of NIS 3.1 billion, earning a profit of NIS 1.25 billion.

Frenkel, with Mubadala Investment Company from Abu Dhabi, acquired 22% stake of the Tamar gas field in the Mediterranean Sea.

In the finance and banking sector, Frenkel is the largest private shareholder in Bank Leumi (2.4%) since June 2022 .

Frenkel is the chairman of the Euro-Asian Jewish Congress (EAJC), the treasurer and senior vice president of the World Jewish Congress (WJC) and the president of Limmud FSU.

Frenkel is also the controlling owner of the loitering munition company UVision.

== Philanthropy ==
=== Health care ===
Frenkel serves as chairman of the International Board of Trustees of Yad Sarah, the largest health and volunteer organization in Israel.

In September 2017, Frenkel established the Frenkel Emergency Medical Center (FEMC) at the Yad Sarah Center in Jerusalem. FEMC includes a medical imaging department, treatment rooms, laboratories, and other facilities.

Frenkel has supported the Sheba Medical Center, Tel Aviv Sourasky Medical Center, and Ezra LeMarpeh.

=== Community ===
Limmud FSU was founded in 2006, and Frenkel serves as its President. Limmud FSU engages young Russian-Jewish adults and empowers them to take ownership of their identity and connect with their communities through pluralistic, egalitarian volunteer-driven conferences of Jewish learning, culture and tradition.

Frenkel, along with others, assisted in the rescue of athletes and asylum seekers from Afghanistan after it fell to Taliban rule.

== Personal life ==
Frenkel is married to Maja Ruth Frenkel, they have 5 children.

== Awards and recognition ==
- Chevalier de L’Ordre de la Légion d'Honneur, awarded by Nicolas Sarkozy.
- Officier de L’Ordre de la Légion d'Honneur, awarded by Emmanuel Macron.
- Chevallier de L'ordre de Grimaldi Medal of Honour, awarded by Prince Albert II of Monaco.
- Officier de L'ordre de Grimaldi Medal of Honour, awarded by Albert II, Prince of Monaco.
- President of Limmud FSU.
- President of the International Council of Yad Sarah.
- Chairman of the Israeli Presidential Conference during the tenure of Shimon Peres as President of the State of Israel.
- Senior Vice-President and Treasurer of the World Jewish Congress
- Board Chairman of the Euro-Asian Jewish Congress
- Honorary Consul of the Republic of Croatia in Jerusalem.
- Fellow Member of the Tel Aviv Museum of Art.
- Tel Aviv University Board of Governors Member.
- Recipient of The Yakir Keren Hayesod Award.
