= Maja Ruth Frenkel =

Croatian entrepreneur

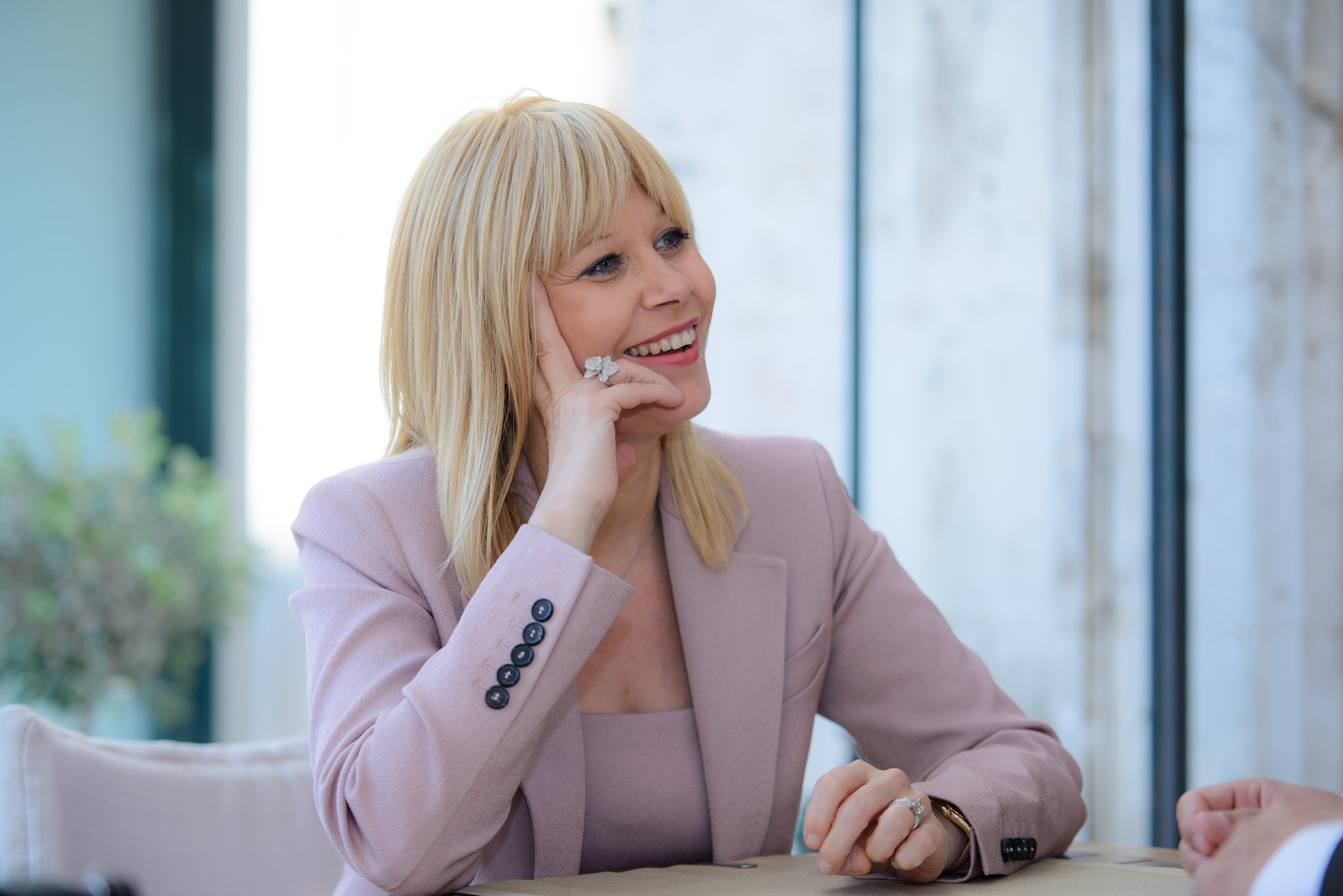
- Born: 14 April 1971 (age 55); Zagreb, SFR Yugoslavia (now Croatia)
- Education: University of Vienna, University of Zagreb
- Spouse: Aaron Frenkel
- Children: 5

Maja Ruth Frenkel (born Maja Brinar; 14 April 1971) is a Croatian entrepreneur and former deputy of Croatian Minister of Economy.

== Education and career ==
Frenkel was born in Zagreb on April 14, 1971. She finished elementary school and Gymnasium in Zagreb. From 1991 to 1992 she attended economy studies at the Vienna University of Economics and Business. In 1994 Frenkel graduated from the Faculty of Economics and Business, University of Zagreb. From 1998 to 2000 she worked at Agrokor as the head of the finance department and board member. In 2000, Frenkel served as Croatian Secretary of State where she was promoted to serve as deputy Minister of Economy, under Goranko Fižulić until 2002. Frenkel was responsible for the privatization of public companies.

Frenkel worked at several other Croatian companies: from 1998 to 2008 she was a member of the supervisory board at DIP Turopolje d.d., from 1997 to 2000 member of the supervisory board at Ledo d.d., in 2000 member of the supervisory board at Jadranski naftovod d.d., from 1999 to 2006 member of the supervisory board at Hotel Opera Zagreb d.d., from 2002 to 2003 INA d.d. Vice President and from 2002 to 2003 member of the supervisory board at Hrvatske šume d.d. (Croatian woods).

Currently Frenkel is working with her husband on different real estate projects as developer. In 2008 Frenkel started EMBA studies at the International University of Monaco.

=== ORIEL ===
Frenkel founded ORIEL, a Monaco-based consultancy concerned with women's financial desicion-making and family wealth organisation.

== Personal life ==
Maja Ruth Frenkel is married to Israeli businessman Aaron Frenkel. Before marriage, Frenkel converted to Judaism after studying with Croatian rabbi Kotel Da-Don. She took the traditional Jewish name Ruth. Frenkel's husband made his fortune in aircraft trade. Former President of Croatia Stjepan Mesić named Frenkel's husband the Croatian honorary consul in Jerusalem.
