= International Journal of STD & AIDS =

- Discipline: Sexual health Medicine
- Language: English
- Edited by: Daniel Richardson

Publication details
- History: 1990-present
- Publisher: SAGE Publications
- Frequency: 13 times per year
- Impact factor: 1.3 (2024)

Standard abbreviations
- ISO 4: Int. J. STD AIDS

Indexing
- CODEN: INSAE3
- ISSN: 0956-4624 (print); 1758-1052 (web)
- LCCN: 90642504
- OCLC no.: 21176258

Links
- Journal homepage; Online access; Online archive

The International Journal of STD & AIDS (to be renamed in January 2027 Global Perspectives in sexual health & HIV) is a monthly peer-reviewed medical journal that covers the field of immunology as applied to sexually-transmitted diseases and HIV/AIDS. Its editor-in-chief is Daniel Richardson a clinician working in Brighton and Sussex Medical School. It was established in 1990 and is published by SAGE Publications.

== Abstracting and indexing ==
The journal is abstracted and indexed in Index Medicus/PubMed/MEDLINE and the Science Citation Index Expanded. According to the Journal Citation Reports, its 2012 impact factor is 1.000, ranking it 62nd out of 69 journals in the category "Infectious Diseases" and 122nd out of 135 journals in the category "Immunology".
