= Société des bains de mer de Monaco =

Monégasque government-owned company

Société anonyme des bains de mer et du cercle des étrangers à Monaco
- Trade name: Monte-Carlo Société des bains de mer
- Type: Public (Société anonyme de droit monégasque)
- Traded as: Euronext Paris: BAIN; CAC All-Share
- ISIN: MC0000031187
- Industry: Hospitality and gaming
- Founded: 2 April 1863
- Founders: Charles III, Prince of Monaco; François Blanc; Marie Blanc
- Headquarters: Monte Carlo, Monaco
- Area served: France; Monaco; United Arab Emirates
- Key people: Stéphane Valeri (Chairman & CEO); Virginie Cotta (Corporate Secretary)
- Owners: Government of Monaco (59.47%); Equity Finance & Investment, owned by Aaron Frenkel (8.01%); UFIPAR SAS (5%); GEG Investment Holdings (4.99%)
- Number of employees: 4,436
- Website: www.montecarlosbm.com

The Société des bains de mer (French pronunciation: [sɔsjete de bɛ̃ d(ə) mɛʁ]; SBM) (Note: Officially the Société anonyme des bains de mer et du cercle des étrangers à Monaco (French pronunciation: [sɔsjete de bɛ̃ d(ə) mɛʁ e dy sɛʁkl(ə) dez‿etʁɑ̃ʒez‿a mɔnako]), French for 'Corporation of Sea Baths and of the Circle of Foreigners in Monaco'.) is a publicly traded company registered in the Principality of Monaco. SBM owns and manages the Monte Carlo Casino, the Opéra de Monte-Carlo and the Hôtel de Paris in Monte Carlo.

== History ==
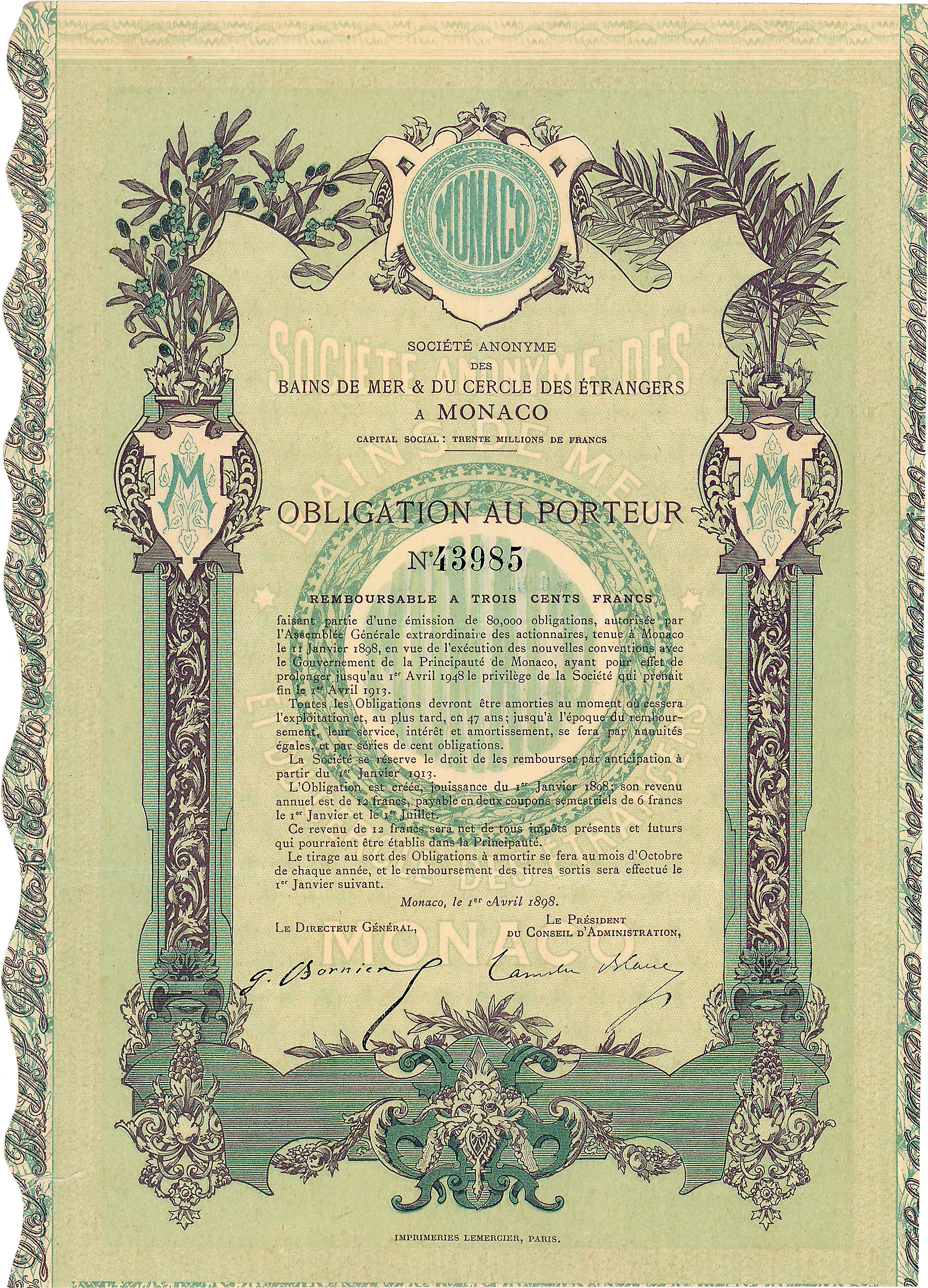
Bond of the S. A. des Bains de Mer & du Cercle des Étrangers à Monaco, issued 1 April 1898

SBM was founded on 2 April 1863 by a sovereign order issued by Charles III, Prince of Monaco. He ceded the company to the businessman François Blanc for 1.7 million gold francs for the privilege of exploiting the monopoly on gambling in the Principality of Monaco for 50 years. It was initially funded with capital of eight million francs divided into 32,000 shares.

=== Basil Zaharoff ===
After World War I, the casino in Monte Carlo was in trouble. The world had changed, particularly the world of money, and the Prince of Monaco, Louis II, believed the casino's aged owner, Camille Blanc, had lost touch. As the casino supplied the principality with revenue, he sought to replace Blanc and bring in fresh business management. For assistance, he approached Basil Zaharoff, an international financier and arms dealer who had long been a patron of the Côte d’Azur. Zaharoff managed to get hold of the shares and, with the aid of the Prince, shouldered Blanc out and became the casino's master. Zaharoff brought in fresh administration and the result paid huge dividends.

=== Aristotle Onassis ===
In 1953, Greek shipping magnate Aristotle Onassis bought up the shares of SBM via the use of front companies in the tax haven of Panama and took control of the organisation, moving his headquarters into the Old Sporting Club on Monaco's Avenue d'Ostende shortly after. Onassis's takeover of the SBM was initially welcomed by Monaco's ruler, Prince Rainier III, as the country required investment, but Onassis and Rainier's relationship had deteriorated by 1962 in the wake of the boycott of Monaco by the French president, Charles de Gaulle.

Onassis and Rainier had differing visions for Monaco. Onassis wished the country to remain a resort for an exclusive clientele, but Rainier wished to build hotels and attract a greater number of tourists. Monaco had become less attractive as a tax haven in the wake of France's actions, and Rainier urged Onassis to invest in the construction of hotels. Onassis was reluctant to invest in hotels without a guarantee from Rainier that no other competing hotel development would be permitted, but promised to build two hotels and an apartment block. Unwilling to give Onassis his guarantee, Rainier used his veto to cancel the entire hotel project, and publicly attacked SBM for their ‘bad faith’ on television, implicitly criticising Onassis. Rainier and Onassis remained at odds over the direction of the company for several years and, in June 1966, Rainier approved a plan to create 600,000 new shares in SBM to be permanently held by the state, which reduced Onassis's stake from 52% to under a third. In the Supreme Court of Monaco, the share creation was challenged by Onassis, who claimed that it was unconstitutional, but the court found against him in March 1967. Following the ruling, Onassis sold his holdings in SBM to the state of Monaco for US$9.5 million ($271 million as of 2015), and left the country.

=== 21st century ===
In 2003, the SBM signed a strategic partnership with Wynn Resorts. In 2005, SBM opened the Monte-Carlo Bay Hotel & Resort.

SBM opened its first non-European establishment on Saadiyat Island, Abu Dhabi, United Arab Emirates, in September 2011. SBM pulled out in 2014.

In 2013, SBM celebrated its 150th anniversary on Monaco's place du Casino: a high end picnic imagined by world known Monégasque chef Alain Ducasse.

== Description ==
The Société des Bains de Mer operates in the accommodation, dining, entertainment, and gambling services. SBM manages and owns casinos, hotels, restaurants, bars, night clubs, spas, beach clubs, and golf clubs. Fifty-two of their fifty-eight properties are located in Monaco. SBM is Monaco's largest employer, with 4436 employees.

== Governance ==
=== CEOs ===
- 2002-2011: Bernard Lambert
- 2011-2023: Jean-Louis Masurel
- Since 2023: Albert Manzone

== Ownership ==
The ownership of The Société des Bains de Mer consists of:

Shareholder	Shares
Government of Monaco	59.47%
Equity Finance & Investment Ltd. owned by Aaron Frenkel	8.01%
LVMH conglomerate (UFIPAR SAS)	5%
GEG Investment Holdings	4.99%
