= Hôtel de Paris =

Luxury hotel in Monaco

Coordinates: 43°44′20″N 7°25′37″E

Hôtel de Paris Monte-Carlo
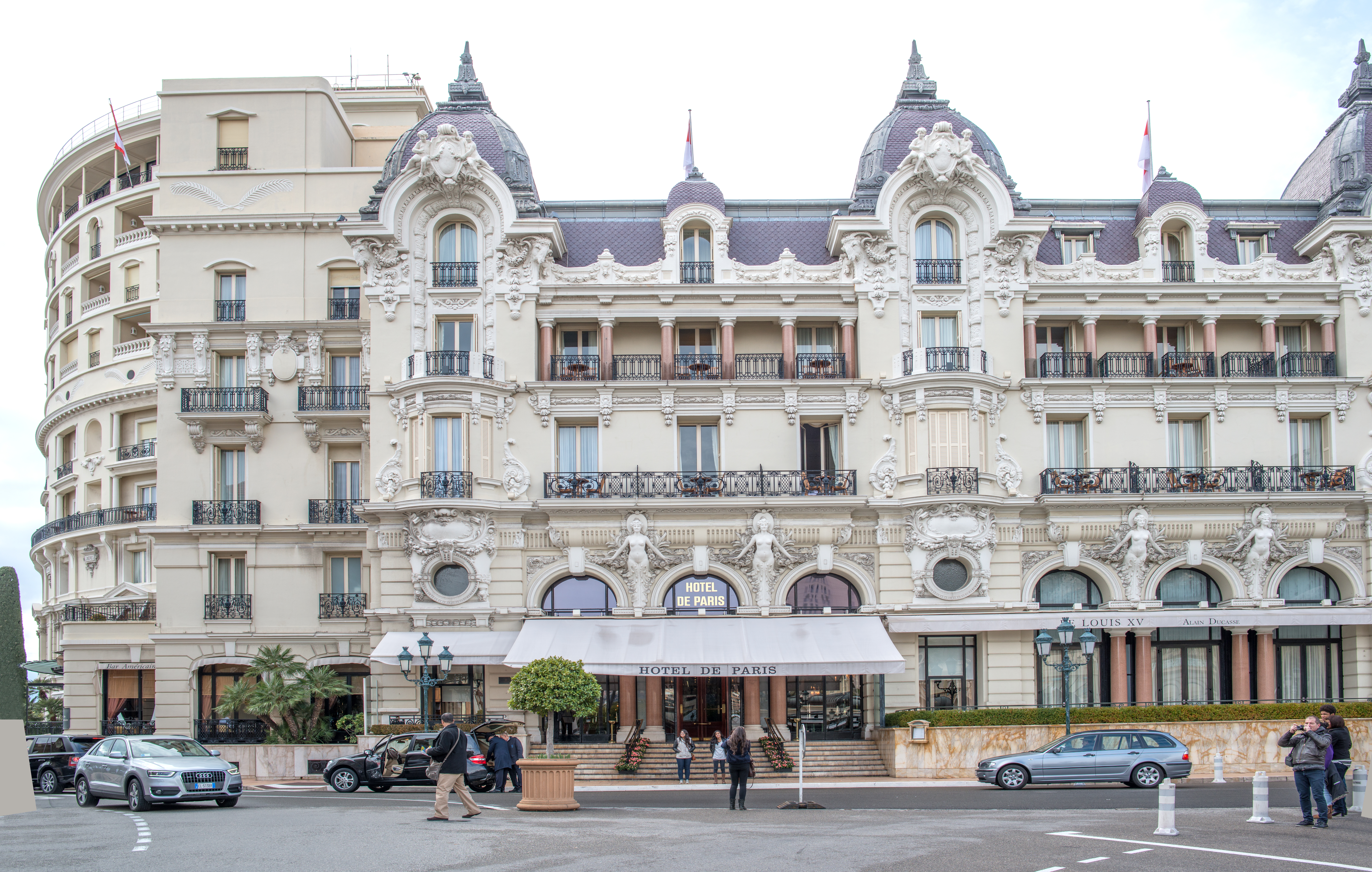
- Interactive map of the Hôtel de Paris Monte-Carlo area

General information
- Type: Luxury hotel
- Architectural style: Belle Époque
- Location: Monte Carlo, Monaco, Place du Casino
- Opened: 1864; 162 years ago
- Owner: Société des Bains de Mer
- Affiliation: The Leading Hotels of the World

Design and construction
- Architects: Godinot de la Bretonnerie (1862); Jules Dutrou (1865 expansion); Édouard Niermans (1908 remodel of the public rooms)

Website
- hoteldeparismontecarlo.com

The Hôtel de Paris Monte-Carlo (French: [otɛl d(ə) paʁi]) is a luxury hotel that is located at Place du Casino in Monte Carlo, Monaco. It was opened in 1864 as part of the development of Monaco by the Société des Bains de Mer. In March 2019, the hotel reopened after undergoing a $280 million renovation, which took more than four years to complete.

== Facilities ==
The hotel has 99 rooms, which are divided into four pricing categories.

The restaurants at the hotel consist of Le Louis XV (Michelin 3-star), Le Grill (Michelin 1-star), Le Bar Americain, and Em Sherif.

== In popular culture ==
The hotel has been featured in numerous films, including Confessions of a Cheat (1936), The Red Shoes (1948), Iron Man 2 (2010), Monte Carlo (2011), and two James Bond films – Never Say Never Again (1983) and GoldenEye (1995). It appeared in the famous UK sitcom Only Fools and Horses where the illustrious duo had to 'leggit' after they became bankrupt during a stay. It was also portrayed in the 2012 animated film Madagascar 3: Europe's Most Wanted.

Artists Andy Warhol and Jamie Wyeth had a joint exhibition at the hotel mounted by New York's Coe Kerr Gallery in July 1980. While Warhol was staying at the hotel, he took Polaroid photos of actor Sylvester Stallone for his silkscreen portraits.

The hotel was a popular shooting location for photographer Helmut Newton.
