= Gildo Pallanca Pastor =

Monaco-based businessman

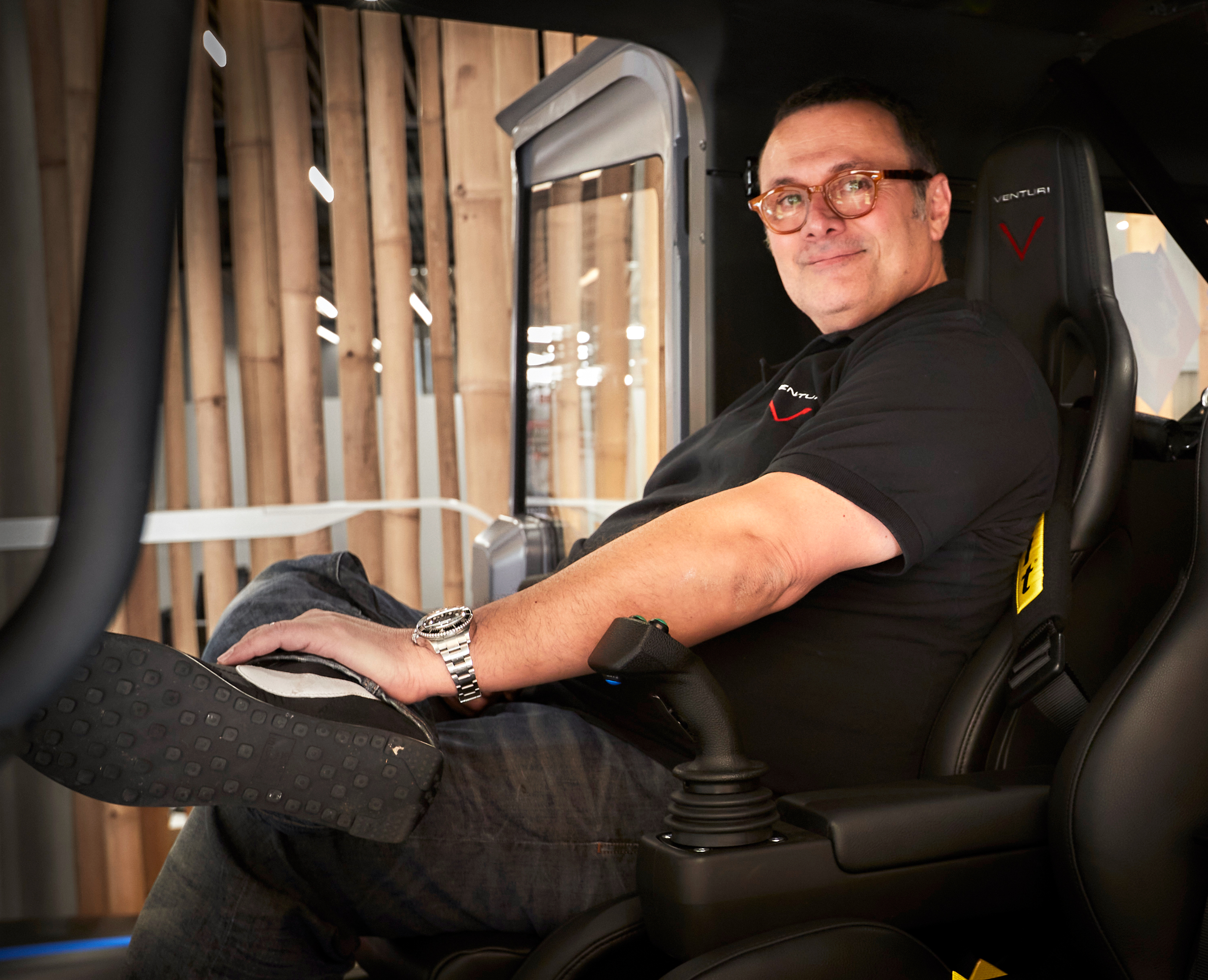
- Born: 1 April 1967 (age 59)
- Education: Massachusetts Institute of Technology
- Occupations: CEO and owner, Venturi
- Parent(s): Hélène Pastor and Claude Pallanca
- Relatives: Michel Pastor (uncle); Victor Pastor (uncle); Philippe Pastor (cousin)
- Website: gildo.com

Gildo Pallanca Pastor (born 1 April 1967) is a Monegasque businessman, real estate developer, and the CEO and owner of Venturi.

== Early life ==
Gildo Pallanca Pastor was born in Monaco, the son of Claude Pallanca and the heiress and businesswoman Hélène Pastor. He has a sister, Sylvia Pastor.

He studied law in France, economic sciences in Italy and real estate construction at the Massachusetts Institute of Technology in Cambridge in the United States.

== Career ==
From 1986 to 1999, he was a racing driver, setting an ice speed record in 1995 in a Bugatti EB1102. He reached a top speed of 315 km/h and an average speed of 296 km/h.

In 1998, at the age of 31, he managed the construction of Monaco's largest office building (90,000 m2), the Gildo Pastor Center, named in honour of his grandfather, Gildo Pastor.

In 2006, Gildo Pallanca Pastor founded Radio MC One, which later became Radio Monaco.

Gildo Pallanca Pastor purchased Venturi in 2001. He also manages the Pastor family's commercial real estate business, Radio Monaco and La Brasserie de Monaco, the Principality's first brewery, launched in 1905 by Prince Albert 1st.

His mother, "the senior surviving member of what is, in effect, Monaco’s second dynasty after the ruling Grimaldis", was murdered in May 2014. Her son-in-law was convicted of the murder in 2018. As she had a net worth of $3.7 billion and two children, he became a billionaire.

Since 2015 he has been Monaco's Consul General to the United States.

Since 2021, Gildo Pastor has set himself a challenge: taking part in the development of a lunar rover and sending it to the Moon in 2026 thanks to SpaceX. To this end, he co-founded with Antonio Delfino a Swiss-based company: Venturi Lab. In June 2023, at the Paris Air Show, the firm revealed its hyper-deformable lunar wheel.

On 3 April 2024, Venturi Group announces that the American company Venturi Astrolab, Inc. (Astrolab), a strategic partner of Venturi Group, has awarded a NASA contract to support the development of the Artemis campaign’s lunar terrain vehicle. Its rover, known as FLEX, is equipped with batteries and wheels developed by Gildo Pastor's teams in Monaco and Switzerland.

== Honours ==
In 2009, Prince Albert II of Monaco made him a Knight of the Order of Saint-Charles.

== Personal life ==
He suffered a stroke in January 2014 and was partially paralyzed.

Pastor is married with two children and lives in New York.
