= Émilie Palace =

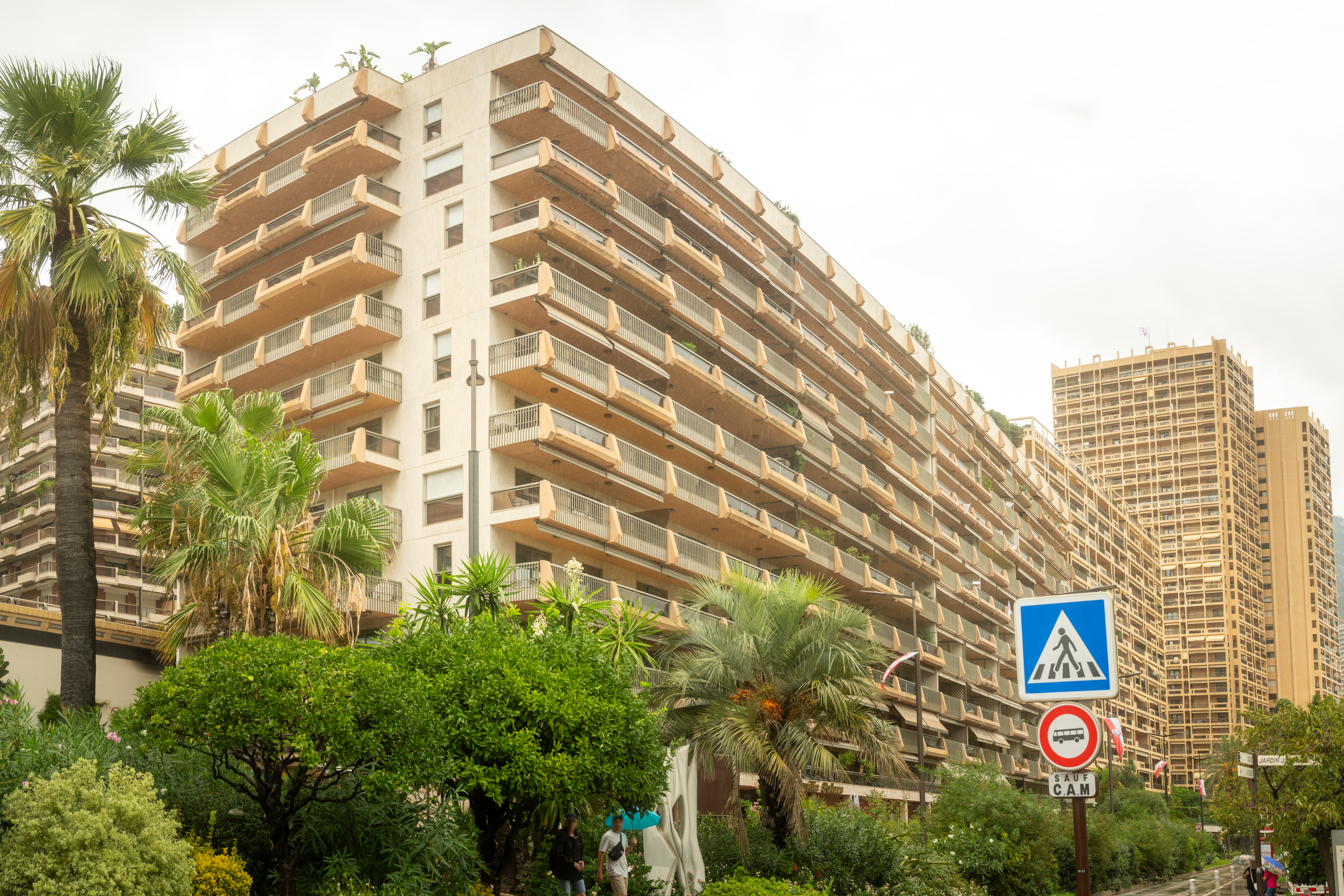
- Interactive map of the Émilie Palace area

General information
- Status: Completed
- Architectural style: Modernist
- Location: 3, Avenue Princesse Grace, Larvotto, Monaco
- Coordinates: 43.742033°N 7.43023°E
- Owner: Hélène Pastor (formerly)

Technical details
- Floor count: 12

The Émilie Palace is a high-rise residential building in Monaco.

== Location ==
It is located at 3 Avenue Princesse Grace in the Larvotto district of Monaco. It faces the Japanese Botanical Garden of Monaco.

== History ==
It was built with concrete and designed in the modernist architectural style. It is 38.35 metre high, with twelve storeys. The building is mostly residential. However, it is also home to some shops and an art gallery.

It was owned by heiress Hélène Pastor through her eponymous real estate company.
