= Michel Pastor =

Businessman and art collector

- Born: 1944; Monaco
- Died: 2 February 2014 (aged 69–70); Monaco
- Occupations: Businessman, art collector
- Spouse: 2, including Catherine Pastor
- Children: 5
- Parent(s): Gildo Pastor; Emilie Louise Brianti
- Relatives: Jean-Baptiste Pastor (paternal grandfather); Victor Pastor (brother); Hélène Pastor (sister); David Hallyday (son-in-law); Valentina Marzocco (daughter-in-law); Philippe Pastor (nephew); Patrice Pastor (nephew); Johnny Hallyday (brother-in-law)

Michel Pastor (1944 – 2 February 2014) was an heir, businessman and art collector from Monaco.

== Early life ==
Michel Pastor was born in 1944. His father, Gildo Pastor, was an heir and businessman. His paternal grandfather, Jean-Baptiste Pastor, settled in Monaco in the 1880s.

He grew up in Monaco with his brother, Victor Pastor, and sister, Hélène Pastor.

== Career ==
In the mid-1980s, Michel Pastor was the corporate director of Edimo Company, which published Theatre Magazine, with Paul Chambrillon as editor-in-chief and Jean-Pierre Thiollet as journalist.

He served as the chief executive officer of the Michel Pastor Group, a real estate firm based in Monaco. The company built many buildings in Monaco, including the Monte Carlo View, Garden House, Le Floridian and the Novotel hotel. Additionally, he owned the Columbia and Houston Palace, located on the Avenue Princesse Grace. Overall, the company was worth US$3.8 billion.

He served as the chairman of the AS Monaco FC from 2004 to 2008. He was the part-owner of Hédiard, a luxury food brand, from 1995 to 2007. He was a shareholder in the auctioneer Artcurial, and the owner of an antique store in Monaco and a restaurant-bar in Gstaad, Switzerland.

He served as the chairman of the Monaco Chamber of Economic Development from 1999 to 2009. He was also chairman of the Grimaldi Forum. Moreover, he became honorary consul to Peru. He was a recipient of the French Legion of Honour in 2011.

== Art collection ==
Pastor was a prominent art collector. He owned paintings by Fernand Léger, Nicolas Poussin and Andy Warhol. He was President of the Maison de l’Amérique Latine, a non-profit organization for Latin American art.

== Personal life ==
Pastor was married twice. With his first wife, Syliane Stella Morell, he had a son, Fabrice Pastor. He then married Catherine Pastor. They had four children, including Alexandra who married David Hallyday, the son of the French singer Johnny Hallyday.

He wintered in Gstaad, Switzerland.

== Death ==
He died of cancer on 2 February 2014. His funeral was held at the Saint-Charles Church in Monaco.

== Honours ==
- France :
  - Officer of the Legion of Honour (April 2011).
  - Officer of the Order of Arts and Letters.
- Italy :
  - Commander of the Order of Merit of the Italian Republic (27 December 1998).
  - Grand Officer of the Order of the Star of Italian Solidarity (2 May 2012).
- Monaco :
  - Commander of the Order of Saint-Charles.
  - Commander of the Order of Grimaldi.
- Peru : Grand Officer of the Order of Merit for Distinguished Service.
- Sovereign Military Order of Malta : Grand Officer Cross pro Merito Melitensi – civilian class –.
