= Patrice Pastor =

Monegasque businessman (born 1973)

- Born: Monaco
- Occupations: Chairman of J.B. Pastor & Fils
- Father: Victor Pastor
- Relatives: Michel Pastor (uncle); Hélène Pastor (aunt); Philippe Pastor (brother)

Patrice Pastor (born 1973) is a Monegasque businessman and property developer. He has been chairman of the Monaco development company J.B. Pastor & Fils since 2002.

== Biography ==
In 1926, the stonemason Jean-Baptiste Pastor created the construction company J.B. Pastor & Fils in Monaco. His son Gildo expanded the family business to real estate development. At his death in 1990, the Pastor family owned 500,000 square meters of real estate property in Monaco, a 19-billion euro fortune that was inherited by Gildo's three children: Victor (1936-2002), Hélène (1937-2014) and Michel (1943-2014).

Patrice Pastor is Victor's son, and succeeded his father at the helms of J.B. Pastor & Fils after his passing in 2002. He is also the head of Pastor Real Estate based in London. He was appointed President of Monaco's syndicate of construction employers (Chambre patronale du bâtiment de Monaco) in 2008. He owned 20% of the Monaco soccer club between 2009 and 2012, was the owner of the weekly L'Observateur de Monaco until 2010, and a 5% shareholder of Société des bains de mer de Monaco from 2020 to 2023.

His company financed the construction of Monaco's new district on the sea, Mareterra, which Prince Albert II called "our first national eco-district, and designed by architects Renzo Piano, Tadao Ando and Norman Foster.

Starting in 2015, he acquired several properties in Carmel-by-the-Sea, California (Hog's Breath, L'Auberge Carmel, Cabin on the Rocks), leading some local residents to question his interest in developing a real estate portfolio in Carmel. He was suspected of plotting the Dossiers du Rocher files, a digital smear campaign targeting Monegasque personalities close to Prince Albert II, especially real estate companies (and Pastor's competitors) involved in major real estate tenders, which he denied.

== Honors ==
- 2009: Knight of the Order of Grimaldi
