= Le Schuylkill =

Coordinates: 43.7381°N 7.4228°E

- Le Schuylkill in 2018, prior to its renovation.
- Interactive map of the Le Schuylkill area

General information
- Status: Completed
- Architectural style: Modernist
- Location: 19, Boulevard de Suisse, Monte-Carlo, Monaco
- Completed: 1970
- Owner: Hélène Pastor (formerly)

Technical details
- Floor count: 25

Le Schuylkill is a historic high-rise residential building in Monaco. Completed in 1970, it is the first modern skyscraper in the principality.

== Location ==
It is located at 19 Boulevard de Suisse in Saint Michel, Monaco.

== History ==
The construction of the building was completed in 1970. It was designed in the modernist architectural style. It is 78 metres high, with twenty-five storeys. It is the fourteenth tallest building in Monaco.

It was owned by heiress Hélène Pastor through her eponymous real estate company. Her daughter, Sylvia Pastor, lived in this building with her companion, the Polish businessman and honorary consul Wojciech Janowski. Another notable resident was Michael Pearson, 4th Viscount Cowdray.

In May 2023, the Communal Council of Monaco approved plans to completely renovate Le Schuylkill at an estimated cost of €170 million. The modernised renovation, designed by Zaha Hadid Architects, will change the current mix of offices and apartments to an all-residential configuration of 142 apartments, as well as entirely replacing the tower's façade. Construction is planned to start in March 2024, with completion estimated for 2028.
