= Fort Antoine Theatre =

Amphitheatre in Monaco-Ville, Monaco

Coordinates: 43°43′58.99″N 7°25′40.66″E

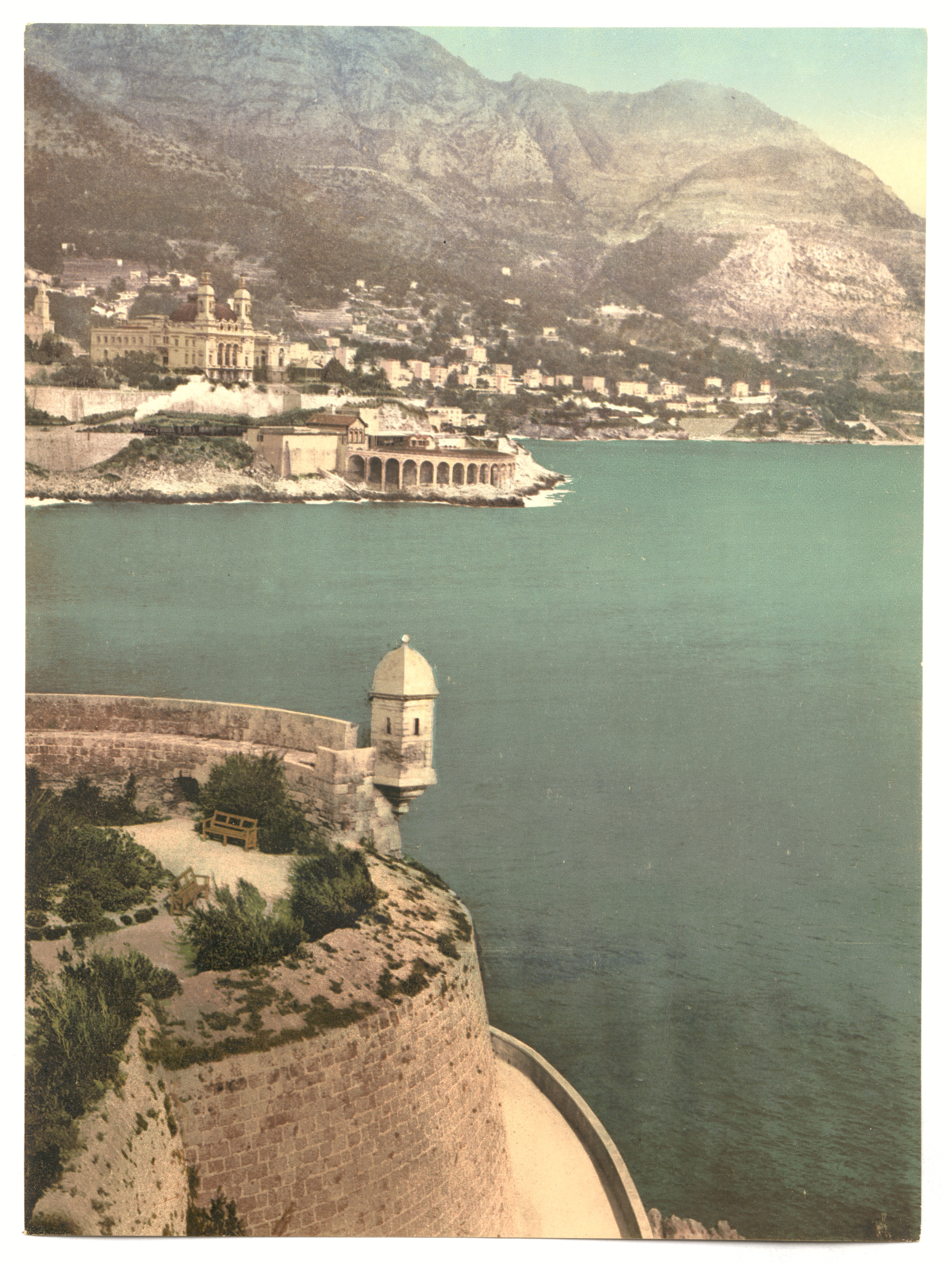
A late 19th-century view of Fort Antoine and Monte-Carlo.

The Fort Antoine Theatre is a small amphitheatre on the Avenue de la Quarantaine in the Monaco-Ville ward of Monaco, on the north-eastern point of the Rock of Monaco. The theatre was originally a fortress that was built in early 18th-century during the War of the Spanish Succession. In the 20th-century, after being destroyed during World War II, the fortress was rebuilt as an open-air theatre.

Today, the theatre hosts open air plays and musical concerts in the summer months. Performances of plays hosted at the theatre include plays written by Jean Cocteau, Jean Giraudoux, and William Shakespeare. The theatre also occasionally hosts film screenings by the Audiovisual Institute of Monaco.

== History ==
The structure that would become the theatre was originally constructed as a fortress by Prince Antoine I in 1714 during the War of the Spanish Succession. The original fort was constructed with underground barracks which were equipped with a cistern. In 1943, after the fall of the Fascist regime in Italy, Germany took control of Monaco and used Fort Antoine as a munitions Depot. On September 3, 1944, the fort was blown up by retreating German troops when the United States liberated Monaco.

In 1953, Prince Rainier III had the ruined fortress rebuilt. Since 1970, the fort served as an open air theatre. The militaristic nature of the fort's architecture has been retained with a bartizan and a pyramid of cannonballs at the centre of the theatre, and the parapet of the fort is emphasized by pittosporum hedges. For more info see Fort Antoine (Monaco).

== In popular culture ==
A scene in the 1995 spy film GoldenEye was filmed at the Fort Antoine Theatre.
