= Japanese Garden, Monaco =

Park in Monaco

Japanese Garden
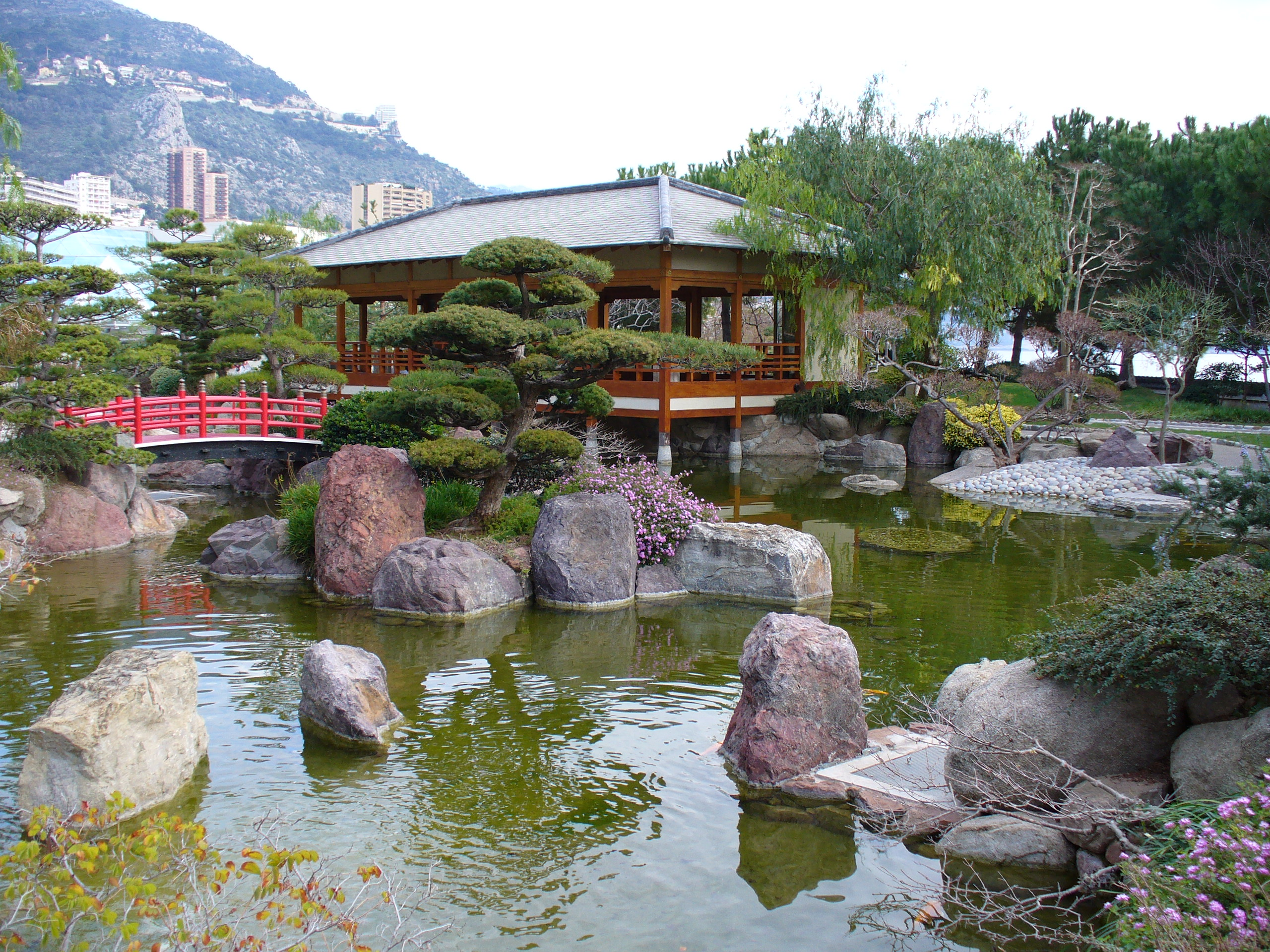
- The Tea House in Monaco's Japanese Garden
- Interactive map of Japanese Garden
- Type: Japanese garden
- Location: Avenue Princesse Grace, Larvotto ward, Monaco
- Coordinates: 43°44′32.37″N 7°25′51.52″E
- Area: 0.7 hectares (1.7 acres)
- Status: Open year round

The Japanese Garden is a municipal park on the Avenue Princesse Grace, in the Larvotto ward of Monaco. It is next to the Grimaldi Forum convention centre. The garden is 0.7 hectares in size, and features a stylised mountain, hill, waterfall, beach, brook, and a Zen garden for meditation. It is open daily from 9:00 to sunset.

The garden was commissioned by Prince Rainier III in 1994. It was designed by Yasuo Beppu, the winner of the Flower Exhibition of Osaka 1990, as a miniature representation of Shintoist philosophy.

== Exhibitions ==
In November 2024, the garden hosted an exhibition of Japanese Bizen ceramics, featuring works by Living National Treasure Jun Isezaki, as well as pieces by emerging contemporary artists.

== Gallery ==
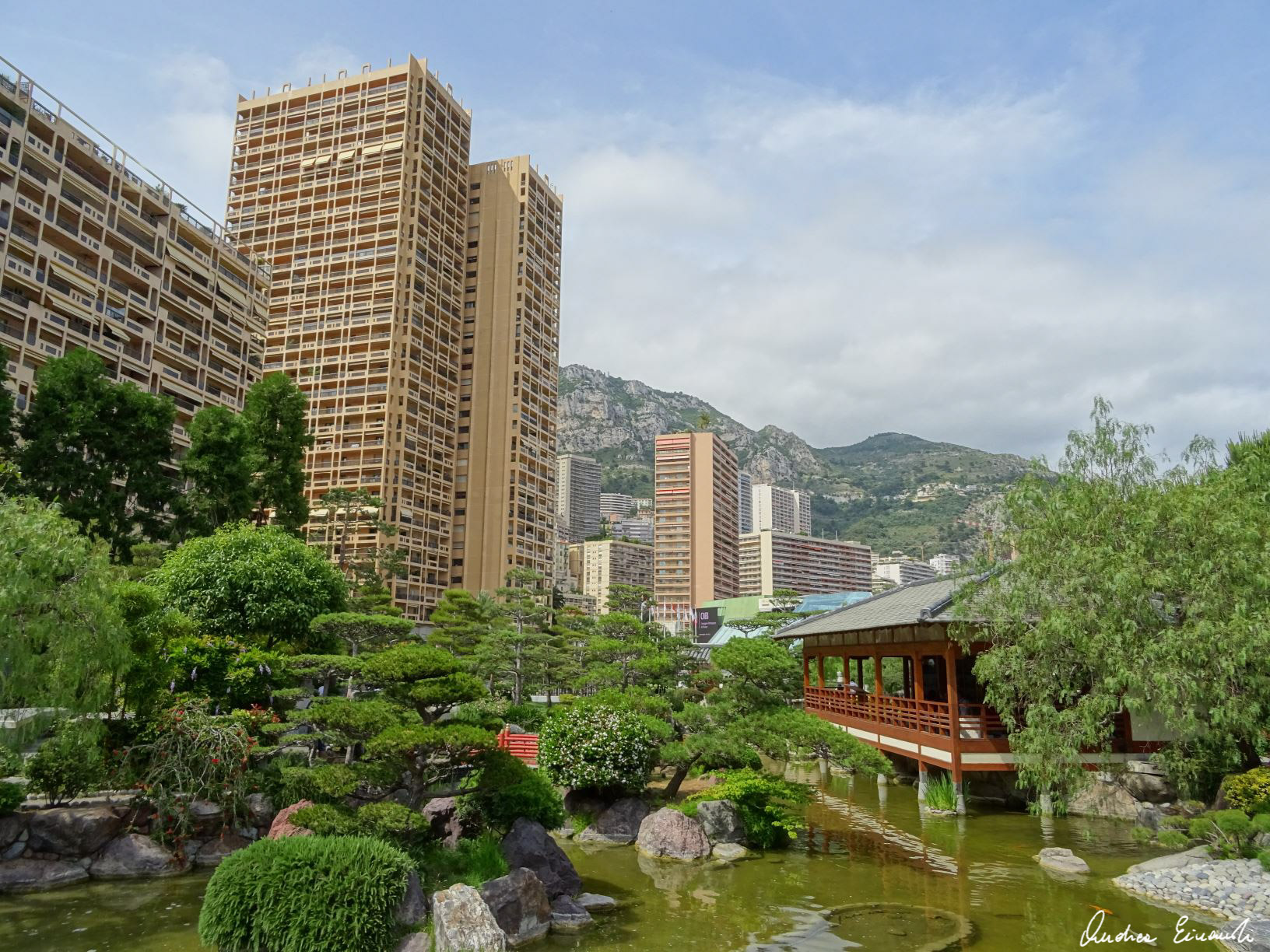
Skyscrapers overlooking the Japanese Garden

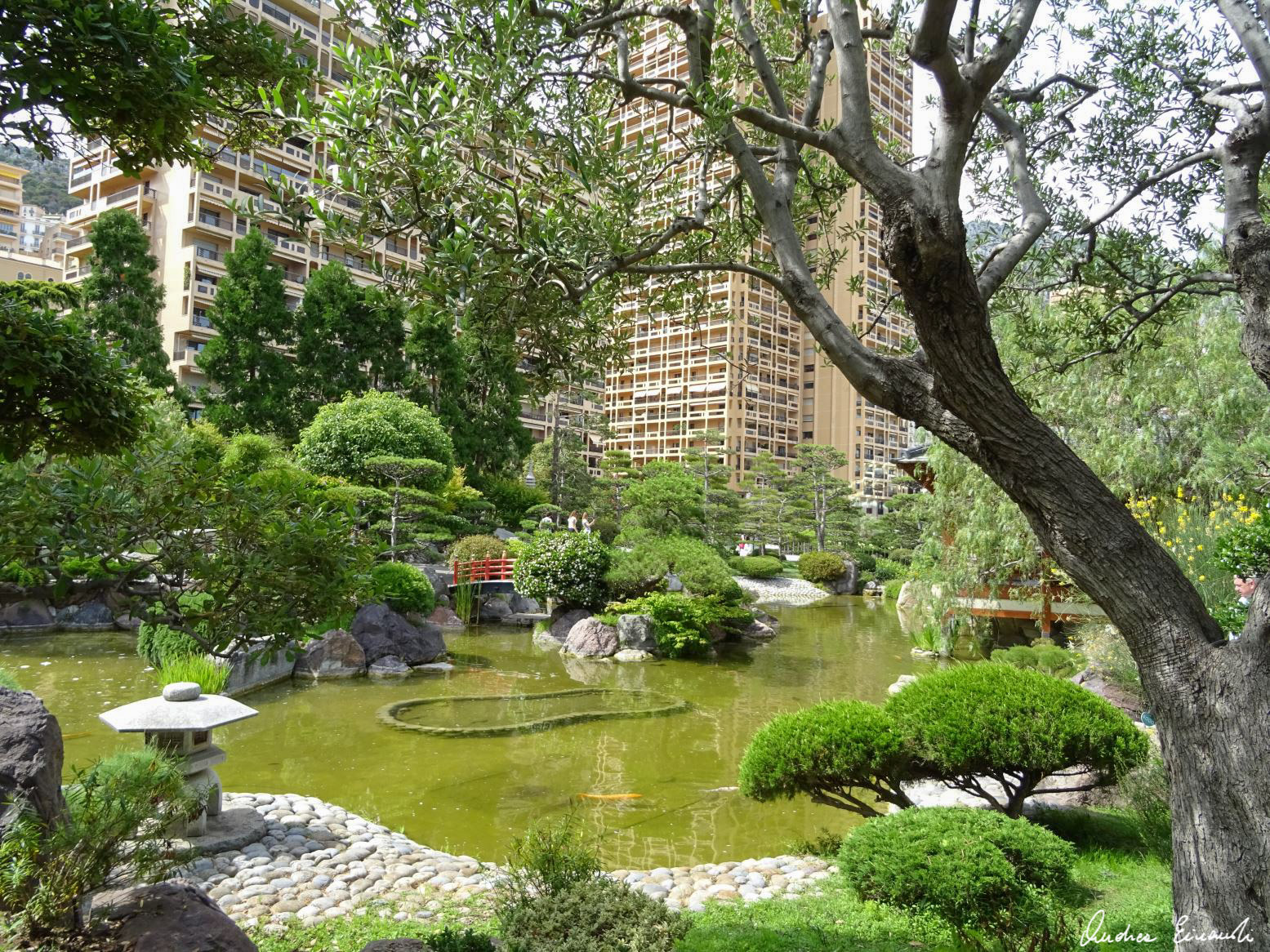
Lake inside the garden 1

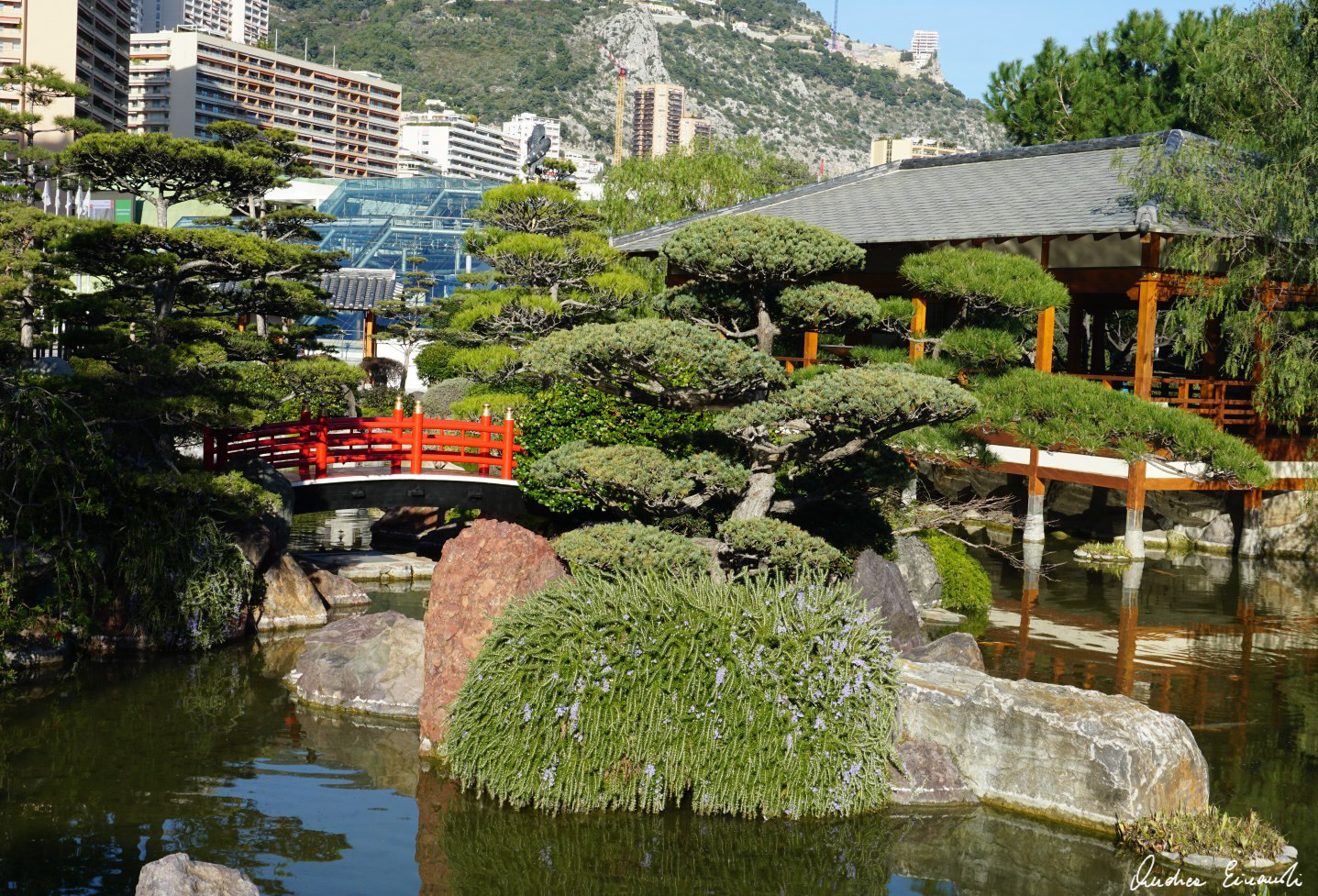
Lake inside the garden 2

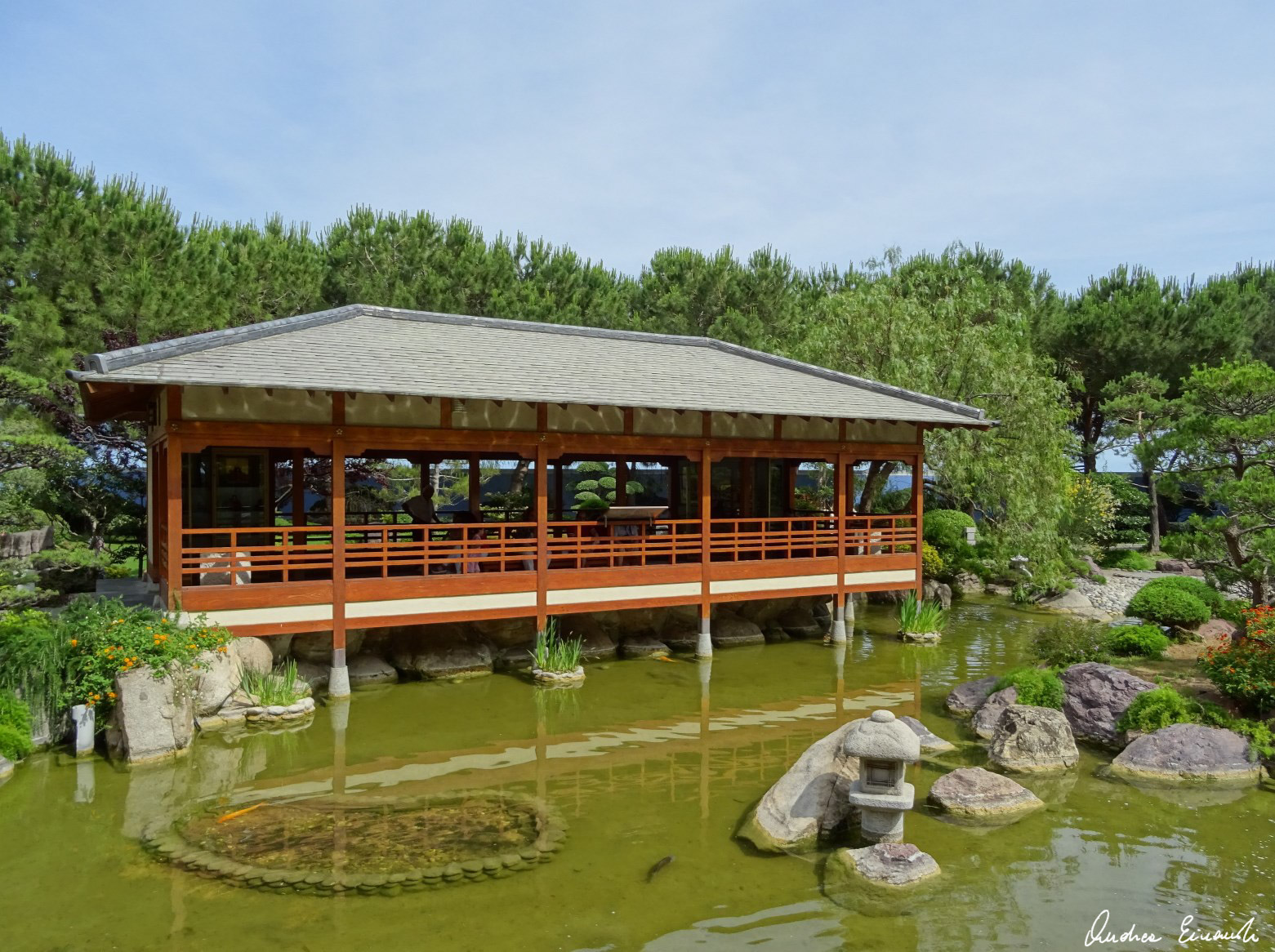
The Tea House 1

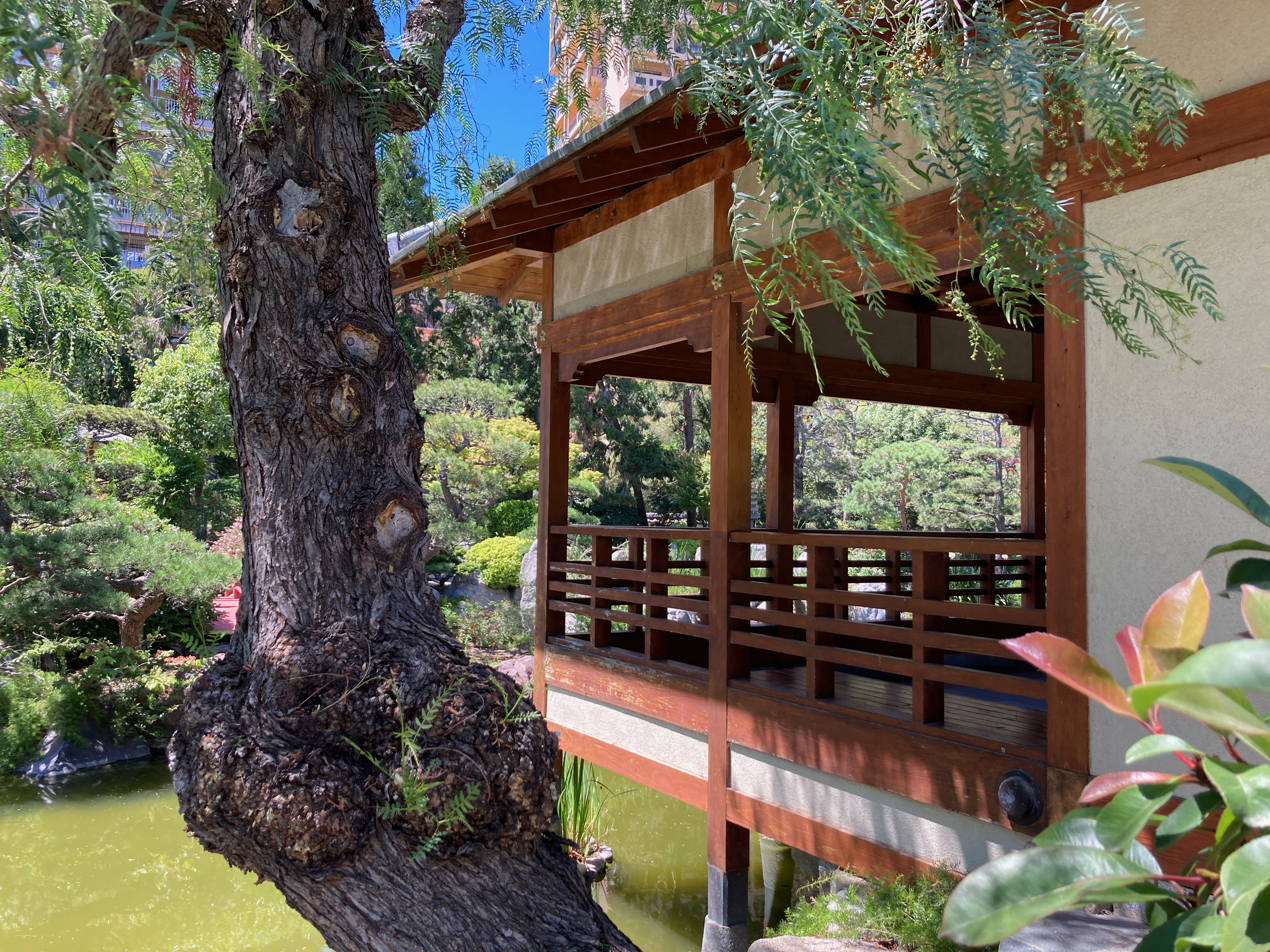
The Tea House 2
