= Philippe Pastor =

Monegasque artist (born 1961)

- Born: 1961 (age 64–65); Monaco
- Occupations: Painter, sculptor
- Parent: Victor Pastor
- Relatives: Jean-Baptiste Pastor (paternal great-grandfather); Gildo Pastor (paternal grandfather); Michel Pastor (uncle); Hélène Pastor (aunt); Gildo Pallanca Pastor (cousin); Patrice Pastor (brother)

Philippe Pastor (born 1961) is a Monegasque artist. An abstract expressionist, his work has been exhibited in Europe, Africa, Asia and the United States. A participant of the 2007 Venice Biennale, he represented Monaco's art scene at the Expo 2015.

== Early life ==
Pastor was born in 1961 in Monaco. His father, Victor Pastor, was a billionaire real estate developer. His paternal grandfather, Gildo Pastor, developed most of the residential buildings along Monaco's coastline. He has two brothers, Jean-Victor and Patrice, and a sister, Marie-Helene. Following his father's death with a net wealth of $5.4 billion, Bloomberg considers each of his four children to be billionaires.

He is self-taught.

== Career ==
Pastor creates art in a barn on the hills of Monaco. He also works in Saint-Tropez and Figueres, near Barcelona in Catalonia. His main theme is the interaction of man with nature in our postmodern, virtual society. He is an abstract expressionist. For his paintings, he uses pigments on large canvases, and sometimes adds dead leaves and twigs.

In Monaco, his work can be seen at Monaco Modern’Art, Le Formentor, alongside the work of Marcelline Lapouffe. Overseas, his work has been exhibited in galleries and museums in France, Italy, Spain, Kenya and the United States. It was also shown at the 2007 Vienna Biennale. His work has been auctioned by Christie's.

Since 2003, Pastor has collected burned wood from the forest of La Garde-Freinet and made sculptures with them to draw attention to the fact that every year, forests are caught on fire on Southern France, Italy and Spain. As part of the United Nations Environment Programme, these sculptures, called "Burned Trees", have been exhibited permanently at the United Nations Office at Nairobi since 2006, and at the Nice Côte d'Azur Airport in Southern France. They were also exhibited in Singapore in 2007. That same year, he founded the Art & Environnement Association. In 2014, the sculptures were exhibited at the Gare du Nord in Paris, in partnership with the Fondation Nicolas Hulot.

At the Expo 2015 in Milan, he was the main artist representing Monaco's artscene.
