= Hélène Pastor =

Monegasque businesswoman

- Born: 31 March 1937; Monaco
- Died: 21 May 2014 (aged 77); Nice, France
- Cause of death: Gunshot wounds
- Occupation: Businesswoman
- Spouse: 2, including Claude Pallanca
- Children: 2, including Gildo Pallanca Pastor
- Parent: Gildo Pastor
- Relatives: Jean-Baptiste Pastor (paternal grandfather); Michel Pastor (brother); Victor Pastor (brother); Philippe Pastor (nephew); Patrice Pastor (nephew); Wojciech Janowski (son-in-law)

Hélène Pastor (31 March 1937 – 21 May 2014) was a Monegasque businesswoman and heiress. She headed what is seen as Monaco’s ‘second dynasty’, and was the richest woman in the principality. She was assassinated by a gang that included her daughter's long-term boyfriend, who was subsequently jailed for life in 2018.

== Early life ==
Hélène Pastor was born in 1937. Her father, Gildo Pastor, was an heir and businessman. Her paternal grandfather, Jean-Baptiste Pastor, was an Italian builder who moved to Monaco in the 1880s.

She grew up in Monaco with her two brothers, Michel Pastor and Victor Pastor.

== Business ==
She was the owner of Helene Pastor Pallanca SAM, a real estate company. She owned Le Bahia and Émilie Palace in the Larvotto district, the Trocadero, Continental and Le Schuylkill apartment buildings, and the Gildo Pastor Center in the Fontvieille district. They were worth US$3.7 billion.

She was the richest woman in Monaco. Most of her wealth came from collecting rent. In its obituary, The Daily Telegraph called her "the senior surviving member of what is, in effect, Monaco’s second dynasty after the ruling Grimaldis". She was known in Monaco as "La Vice Princesse" (English: "The Vice Princess").

Her family's real estate portfolio was reported to include about 4,000 apartments in Monaco.

== Personal life ==
She was married twice. With her first husband, she had a daughter, Sylvia Pastor, born in 1961, who lived with Wojciech Janowski, a Polish-born businessman, for 28 years.

She then married Claude Pallanca, a dentist. They had a son, Gildo Pallanca Pastor, born in 1967.

== Assassination ==
On 6 May 2014, Pastor was traveling by car from the L' Archet Hospital in western Nice, France, where she had been visiting her son. Minutes later, a gunman fired at her car, hitting both Pastor and her chauffeur, Mohamed Darouich. She was rushed to the Saint Roch hospital in central Nice, and fell into a coma. Darouich died from his injuries on 11 May. Pastor woke up from her coma on 16 May, but died five days later, on 21 May, at age 77.

Upon her death, the Prince's Palace of Monaco released a statement saying, "HSH the Prince expresses his deep compassion to the children of Mrs Hélène Pastor-Pallanca at the announcement of her tragic passing." Her funeral was attended by Albert II, Prince of Monaco.

Christian Estrosi, the Mayor of Nice, released the following statement: "My thoughts go out to Gildo, Hélène Pastor’s son, as well as all of her relatives. I share their pain and grief. My thoughts also go out to all the Monégasques who were devastated by this tragedy."

In June 2014, her daughter's long-term boyfriend, Wojciech Janowski, admitted to being involved with her assassination. In 2017, Janowski and nine more individuals, including fitness trainer Pascal Dauriac and his brother-in-law Abdelkader Belkhatir, were summoned to court for trial. On 17 October 2018, Janowski was sentenced to life in prison.
