= Sporting d'Hiver =

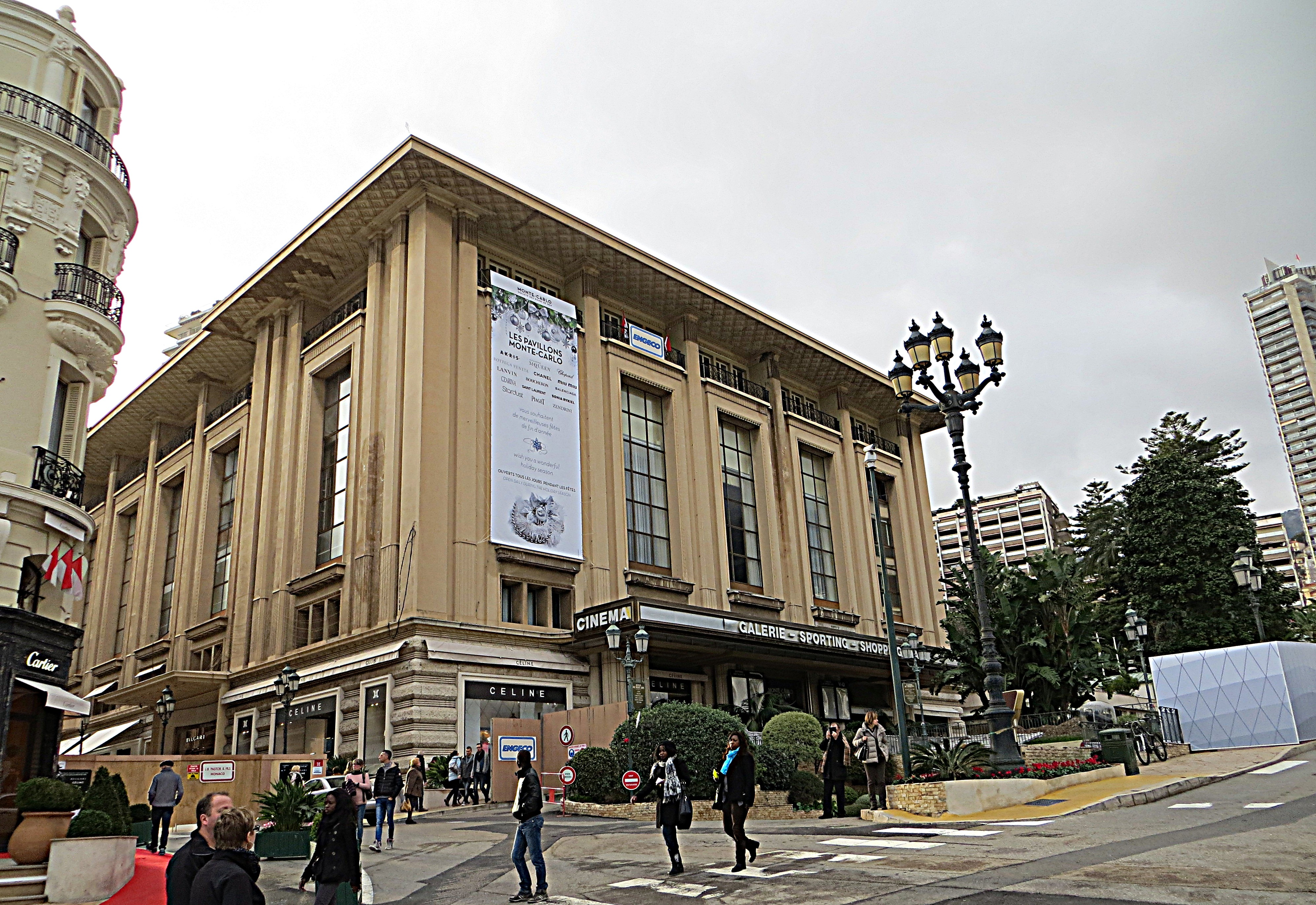
- The building in January 2015
- Interactive map of the Sporting d'Hiver area

General information
- Status: Demolished
- Architectural style: Art Deco
- Location: Monte Carlo, Monaco
- Completed: 1932
- Demolished: 2015
- Owner: Société des bains de mer de Monaco

The Sporting d'Hiver was a historic building in Monte Carlo, Monaco, which was built in 1932 and demolished in 2015. Designed in the Art Deco architectural style, it was originally used as an event venue and exhibition space.

== History ==
The building was completed in 1932, and it was designed in the Art Deco style. The building was "once used to host glamorous parties and exhibitions for the world's high society".

By 1974, most society events had moved to the newly built Monte-Carlo Sporting in the Larvotto district. In subsequent years, the Sporting d'Hiver was home to a cinema, SBM offices, and stores.

In 2008, Albert II, Prince of Monaco, authorized the Société des bains de mer de Monaco (SBM) to demolish it and construct a new building complex in its place. Many Monégasque citizens and residents objected to the demolition, including Laurent Nouvion, who served as the president of the National Council. The building came down in June 2015.

A new building complex was designed in the postmodern architectural style by Richard Rogers. It was completed in 2019 and is known as One Monte-Carlo.
