= Monte-Carlo Sporting =

Building complex in Larvotto, Monaco

Coordinates: 43.7472°N 7.4382°E

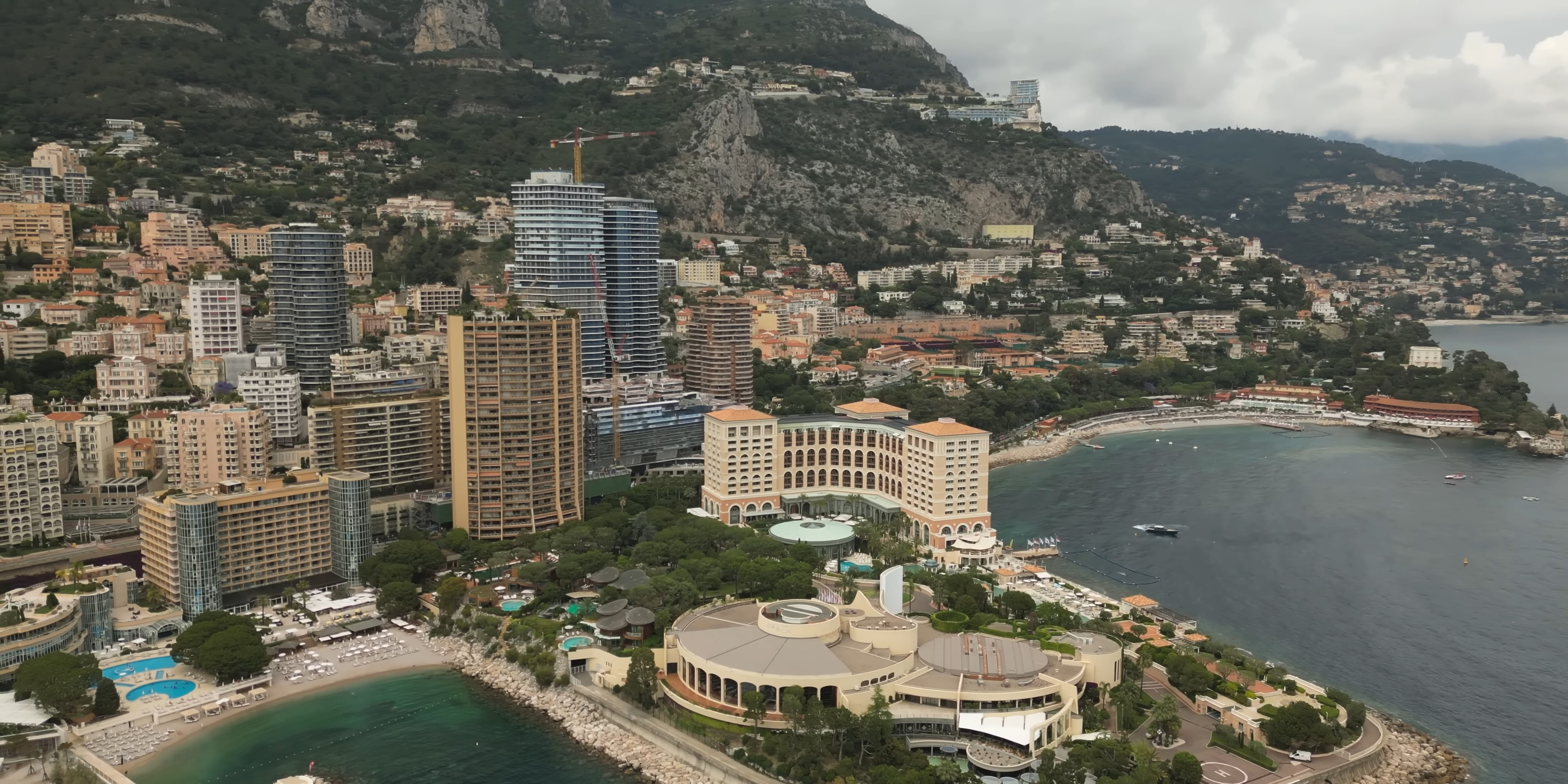
- View of the building complex, which can be seen at the bottom in the centre
- Address: 26 Avenue Princesse Grace
- Location: Larvotto, Monaco
- Owner: Société des Bains de Mer
- Operator: Monte-Carlo Live

Construction
- Opened: 2 June 1974
- Renovated: 1999

Website
- Official website

The Monte-Carlo Sporting (French: Sporting Monte-Carlo), also known as the Sporting d'été, is a building complex in the Larvotto ward on the eastern edge of Monaco. It includes the Salle des Étoiles concert hall, and it is the main venue for society fundraisers in Monaco.

== History ==
The building complex was constructed from 1973 to 1974 by Groupe Pastor, a construction company founded by Gildo Pastor, and it was renovated in 1999. It is owned by the Société des Bains de Mer (SBM).

Many society fundraisers, formerly held at the Sporting d'Hiver, are now held at the Salle des Étoiles inside the Sporting d'été. It is home to the annual Monte-Carlo Sporting Summer Festival, the Monte-Carlo Red Cross Ball and the Rose Ball.
