= Le Bahia =

- Interactive map of the Le Bahia area

General information
- Status: Completed
- Architectural style: Modernist
- Location: 39, Avenue Princesse Grace, Larvotto, Monaco
- Coordinates: 43.74763°N 7.43426°E
- Completed: 1971
- Owner: Hélène Pastor (formerly)

Technical details
- Floor count: 12

Le Bahia is a high-rise residential building in Monaco.

== Location ==
It is located at 39 Avenue Princesse Grace in the Larvotto district of Monaco.

== History ==
The construction of the building was completed in 1971. It was built by the Monegasque construction firm, J. B. Pastor et fils. It was designed in the modernist architectural style. It is 38.35 metres high, with twelve storeys.

It was owned by heiress Hélène Pastor through her eponymous real estate company.

The building is mostly residential. However, it is also home to some shops.
