= Sylvie Biancheri =

French director of cultural center

Sylvie Biancheri is the General Director of the Grimaldi Forum in Monaco. She has organized several exhibitions, including The Gold of the Pharaons.
