= Victor Pastor =

Monegasque businessman

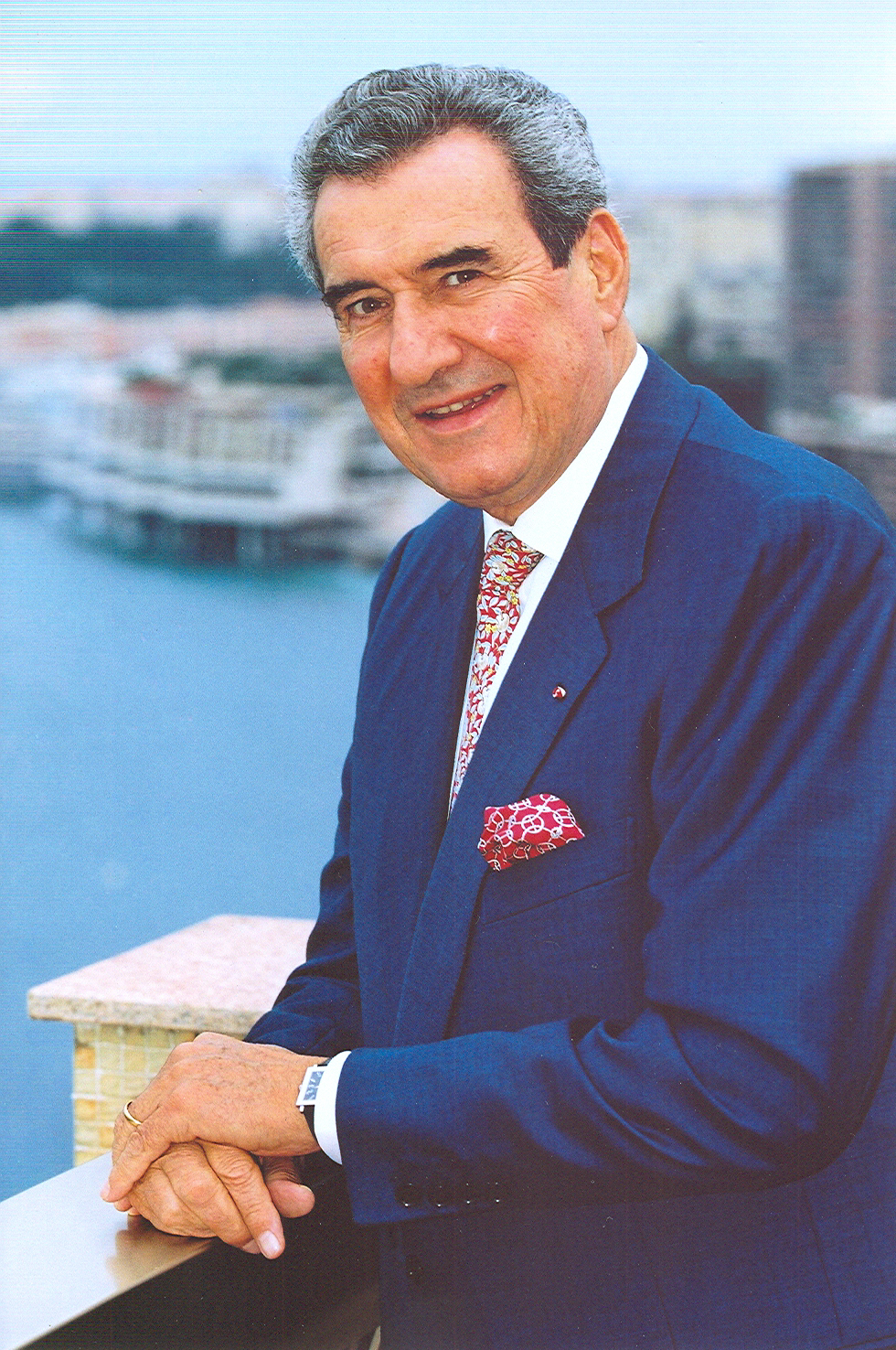
- Born: 1936; Monaco
- Died: 2002 (aged 65–66)
- Occupation: Businessman
- Children: Philippe, Marie-Helene, Jean-Victor, and Patrice Pastor
- Parent: Gildo Pastor
- Relatives: Jean-Baptiste Pastor (paternal grandfather); Hélène Pastor (sister); Michel Pastor (brother)

Victor Pastor (1937 – 2002) was a Monegasque businessman and one of the three heirs of the Monaco construction magnate Gildo Pastor.

== Early life ==
He was born in Monaco, the son of the property developer Gildo Pastor.

== Career ==
He founded Group Pastor.

In 1973, he was responsible for (assisted by his cousins Edmond and Jean-Antoine Pastor) the construction of the concert venue, Salle des Etoiles at Sporting Monte-Carlo, also known as the Summer Sporting Club. His sons Patrice and Jean-Victor have described this as "the most complicated and the most innovative project in the history of the family business", especially the "amazing slideback roof", which was "true technical prowess in those days". In 2014, Sporting d’Eté celebrated its 40th anniversary. The complex includes the nightclub Jimmy'z.

According to Bloomberg, the properties owned by Victor's branch of the Pastor family had a total value of $5.4 billion.

== Personal life ==
He had four children:

- Philippe Pastor (1961-), artist
- Marie-Hélène (1965-)
- Jean-Victor Pastor (1968-), Director of J.B. Pastor & Fils
- Patrice Pastor (1973-), Chairman of J.B. Pastor & Fils
