= Monte Carlo View =

Coordinates: 43.7339°N 7.4137°E

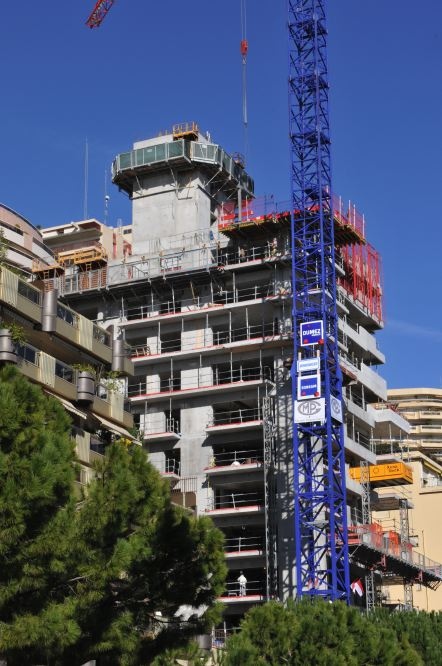
- Interactive map of the Monte Carlo View area

General information
- Status: Completed
- Architectural style: Postmodern architecture
- Location: 8-28 Avenue Hector Otto, Monaco
- Construction started: 2008
- Completed: 2012

Technical details
- Floor count: 20

Design and construction
- Architect: Jean-Michel Wilmotte
- Developer: Michel Pastor Group

The Monte Carlo View, also known as the Teotista, is a residential high-rise building in Monaco.

The building was developed by the Michel Pastor Group. Construction began in 2008, and it was completed in 2012. It is 63.92 metres high, with 20 stories, and six underground floors. There is also a swimming-pool on the rooftop. It was designed in the postmodern style by French architect Jean-Michel Wilmotte.
