= Gildo Pastor Center =

Building in Monaco

- Interactive map of the Gildo Pastor Center area

General information
- Status: Completed
- Architectural style: Modernist
- Location: 7, Rue du Gabian, Fontvieille, Monaco
- Coordinates: 43.729498°N 7.414689°E

Technical details
- Floor count: 12

The Gildo Pastor Center is a high-rise commercial building in Monaco.

== Location ==
It is located at number 7 on the Rue du Gabian in Fontvieille, Monaco.

== History ==
The construction of the building was carried out by Monegasque heir Gildo Pallanca Pastor. The building was owned by his mother, heiress Hélène Pastor. It was named in honor of her father, Gildo Pastor. It served as the headquarters of her eponymous real estate company.

It is 125.82 ft. high, with twelve storeys. It was built with concrete and designed in the modernist architectural style. Underneath the building, there are three flights of underground parking, with 900 parking spaces.

The building is home to a restaurant named Le Bureau. It is also rented out as corporate offices to companies such as Gestion Maritime, Avinco, a helicopter company, Oceanco, a yacht retailer, and GasLog, a shipping company.
