= Jean-Baptiste Pastor =

Italian-born Monegasque businessman and real estate developer

- Born: Giovanni Battista Pastor; 1873; Pigna, Italy
- Died: 20 June 1966 (aged 93); Monte Carlo, Monaco
- Occupations: CEO and owner, J.B. Pastor & Fils
- Children: Gildo Pastor
- Relatives: Michel Pastor (grandson); Hélène Pastor (granddaughter); Victor Pastor (grandson); Philippe Pastor (great-grandson)

Jean-Baptiste Pastor (born Giovanni Battista Pastor; 1873 - 20 June 1966) was an Italian-born Monegasque businessman and real estate developer. He was primarily known for founding J.B. Pastor & Fils in 1920, which became a leading construction company in Monaco.

== Early life ==
Giovanni Battista Pastor was born in 1873 in Buggio, Italy, above Pigna, Province of Imperia, just across the border from France. He was orphaned at an early age, and was already working as a miner by the age of 13, or as a stonemason, according to another source.

== Career ==
He emigrated to Monte Carlo as a young man in 1880, to seek work on the construction of the Saint-Charles Church.

His career as a public works contractor was a success. Pastor eventually started his own company, J.B. Pastor & Fils, in 1920, and won the contracts to build Monaco's water supply system. In 1936, Prince Louis II of Monaco awarded Pastor and his company J.B. Pastor & Fils, the commission to build the country's first football stadium. The Stade Louis II was finished in 1939 and had a capacity of 12,000.

With his newfound wealth, Pastor bought seafront land at low prices after World War II, particularly in the Larvotto district, when there was still no development east of the casino. With the post-war tourism slump, Prince Rainier resolved to diversify from gambling and turned Monaco into a tax haven. In subsequent decades, Pastor's son Gildo was able to build apartment blocks, after getting planning permission to develop in 1966 on this now very valuable land, retaining ownership, and avoiding long leases to maximise rental income.

When his granddaughter, Hélène Pastor was shot dead in 2014, it was reported that the Pastors were Monaco's "second dynasty", behind the ruling Grimaldi family, with an estimated holding of 15 percent of Monaco's housing stock, valued at approximately €20 billion.

== Personal life ==
Pastor was married and lived in Monaco. His son was Gildo Pastor.
