= Fort Antoine (Monaco) =

One of the stone observation "turrets". Various parts of the fort can be seen up the hill.

Fort Antoine is a Monégasque fortification constructed in the early 18th Century. The fort was constructed during the War of the Spanish Succession (1701–1714), to protect the city from a landing by either the British or the Spanish. The fort didn’t see combat during the war, and afterwards it was abandoned since the cost to operate was too high. The fort saw various uses in the three centuries that followed.

== Description ==
Fort Antoine takes up about 1 sq. mi worth of land, and is constructed out of stone. The fort was ordered by Prince Antoine I, which is where the fort gets its name. The fort was built to command the eastern approaches to the city. The outer ramparts were 20m (60ft) tall and were very thick to protect them against cannon fire. The walls were topped with walkways and ‘high and lows’, also called crenelations. At each corner of the ramparts were small round towers for observation and firing on anyone who reached the base of the walls. The fort was armed with 14 bronze cannons and 2 mortars, which were gifts from Louis XIV of France. With the exception of the 2 mortars and 1 cannon, all of the guns were of a high caliber and all were well made. These guns were removed after Fort Antoine was abandoned, and were later used for gun salutes on important days.

== History ==
Fort Antoine was built during the War of the Spanish Succession, which lasted between 1701 and 1714. The fort’s main purpose was to guard the seaward side of Monaco against a naval landing by either Britain or Spain. The fort didn’t see action during the war and was summarily abandoned due to high costs in 1715. The fort gradually became more and more obsolete as artillery advanced. By 1887, when the High-Energy shell was invented, the fort had become almost completely obsolete.

Part of the older wall with the newer wall in the top right.

Fort Antoine was periodically used on important days for gun salutes, but that was about it. During France’s revolutionary period, the fort was occupied by French troops. They garrisoned it until Napoleon’s fall at the Battle of Waterloo in 1815, after which they withdrew and turned it over to the Monegasque armed forces. After the fall of France in June 1940, the Prince of Monaco, Louis II of Monaco, managed to keep Monaco its own sovereign nation. In 1942, the nation was occupied by Italy under a false claim to the land. When Italy capitulated in Sept. 1943, the fort was occupied by the Germans. The Germans turned the fort into an ammunition depot for the occupying forces. Some of the tunnels beneath the fort were also used as air-raid shelters by both the occupiers and the local population. On Sept. 3, 1944, as American forces drew near, the German garrison sabotaged the fort using dynamite, severely damaging it.

In 1953, Rainier III of Monaco ordered that Fort Antoine be rebuilt, but as a theatre. The walls were cleaned up and rebuilt, returning the fortification to its original state. The theatre can seat 325 people, and is mainly used in the summer.

== See also ==
- Fort Antoine Theatre
- Prince's Palace of Monaco
