= Le Formentor =

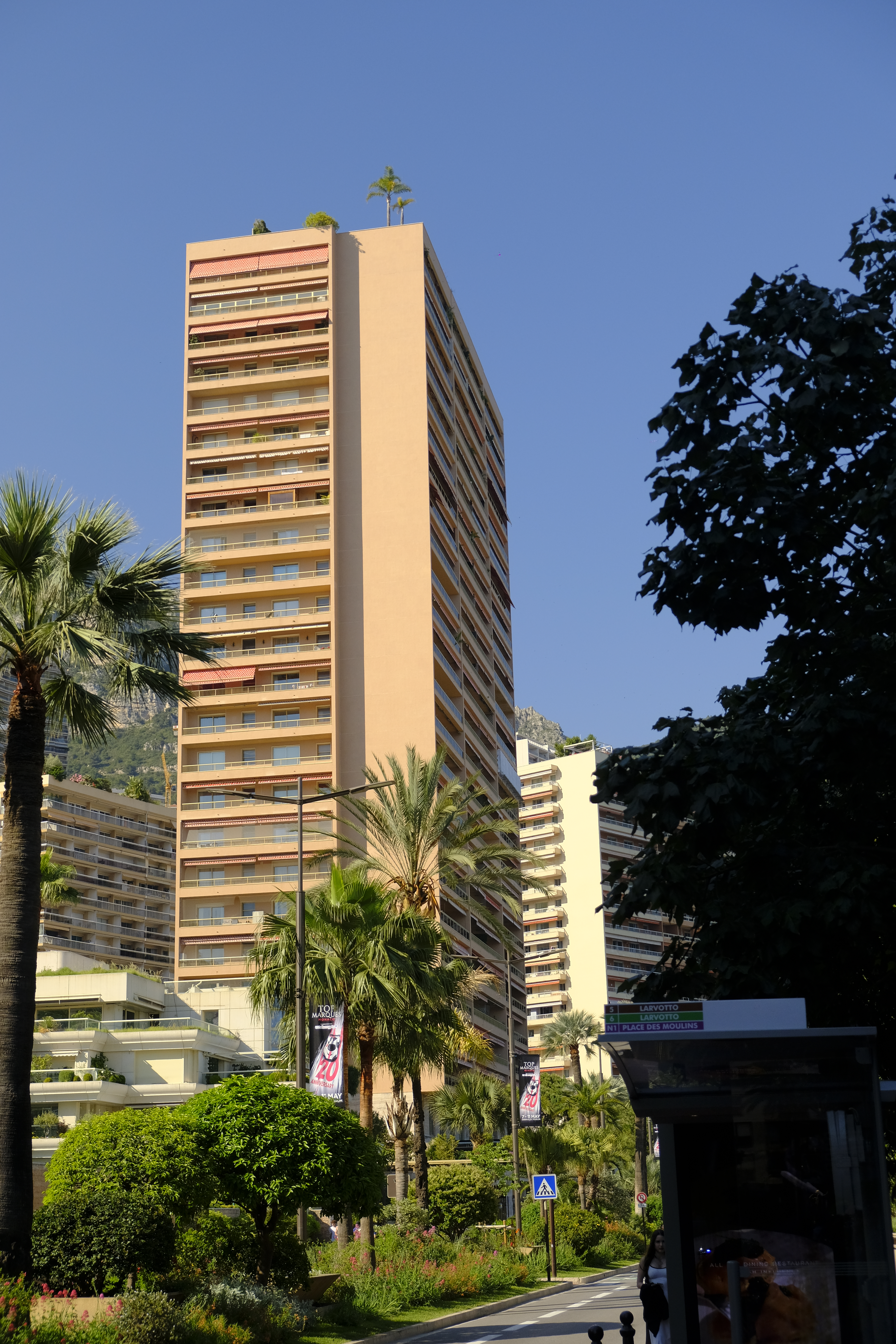
- Interactive map of the Le Formentor area

General information
- Status: Completed
- Architectural style: Modernist
- Location: 27, Avenue Princesse Grace, Larvotto, Monaco
- Coordinates: 43.745449°N 7.431502°E
- Completed: 1981
- Owner: Groupe Pastor

Technical details
- Floor count: 27

Design and construction
- Developer: J. B. Pastor et fils

Le Formentor is a high-rise residential building in Monaco.

== Location ==
It is located at 27 Avenue Princesse Grace in the Larvotto district of Monaco.

== History ==
The construction of the building was completed in 1981. It was built by the Monegasque construction firm, J. B. Pastor et fils. It is owned by the Groupe Pastor, whose offices are located in the building. It is 27-storey high, at 78.00 metre. It was built in concrete in the modernist architectural style.

Monaco Modern’Art, an art gallery, is located in the building. The consulate of Uruguay in Monaco is also located in Le Formentor.

== Notable residents ==
- Victor Hervey, 6th Marquess of Bristol (apartment 1E)
- Novak Djokovic
