= Stade Louis II (1939) =

Former stadium in Fontvieille, Monaco

- Interactive map of Stade Louis II
- Full name: Stade Louis II
- Location: Fontvieille, Monaco
- Coordinates: 43°43′39″N 7°24′56″E
- Owner: Monaco
- Operator: Monaco
- Capacity: 12,000

Construction
- Opened: 1939
- Closed: 1985

Tenant
- AS Monaco FC

Stade Louis II was a multi-use stadium in Fontvieille, Monaco. It was initially used as the stadium of AS Monaco FC matches. It was rebuilt and replaced by a new Stade Louis II in 1985. The capacity of the stadium was 12,000 spectators.

In 1936, Prince Louis II of Monaco awarded Jean-Baptiste Pastor and his company J.B. Pastor & Fils, the commission to build the country's first football stadium. It was finished in 1939.

The stadium hosted major professional boxing world title and non title fights from time to time; those include the Carlos Monzon versus Nino Benvenuti rematch, Monzon's rematch with Emile Griffith, Monzon's two classic fights with Rodrigo Valdes, Davey Moore versus Wilfredo Benitez, and the double knockout-ending classic between Lee Roy Murphy and Chisanda Mutti (won by Murphy), Other major fights have been held at the similarly named Stade Louis II.
