= EVER Monaco =

Renewable technology exhibition

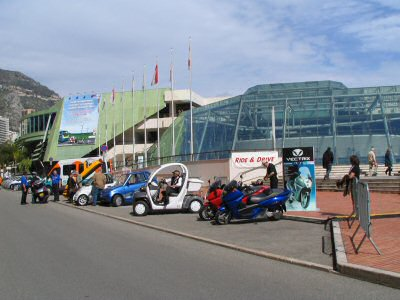
Test driving in front of the Grimaldi forum

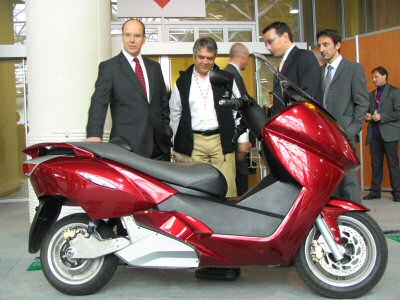
Albert II, Prince of Monaco discusses the electric maxi scooter with the exhibitor

EVER Monaco is annual exhibition and conference event showcasing the latest renewable energy technology with a focus on vehicle design. "EVER" is a (somewhat flawed) acronym for "ecologic vehicles and renewable energies."

The Venturi Fetish, the world's first production two-seater electric sports car, became the sensation of the first EVER, held in 2005. The Fetish has a range of 250 to 350 km (160 to 220 mi) and boasts a 0–100 km/h (0–62 mph) time of 4.5 seconds.

The 2009 EVER took place in and around Monaco’s Grimaldi Forum, a 35,000-m^{2} (377,000-sq. ft.) arena on the shores of the Mediterranean Sea, from 26 to 29 March.

== See also ==
- Electric cars
- Electric vehicle conversion
- Battery electric vehicle
- Hybrid vehicle
