= Avenue Princesse Grace =

Street in Larvotto, Monaco

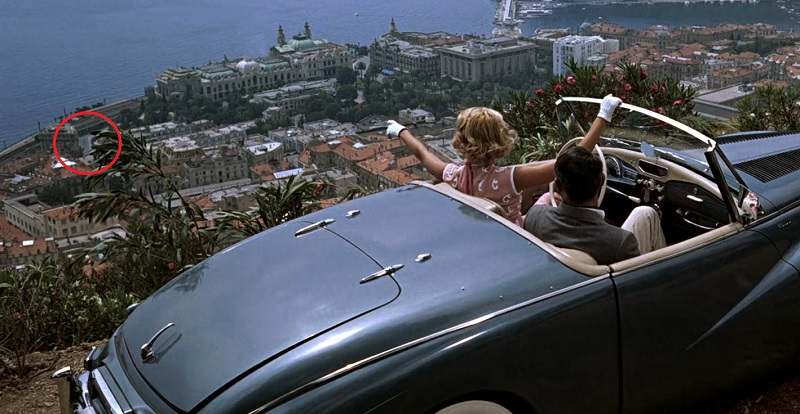
Grace Kelly, in To Catch a Thief, points towards the road (circled) which was later named after her.

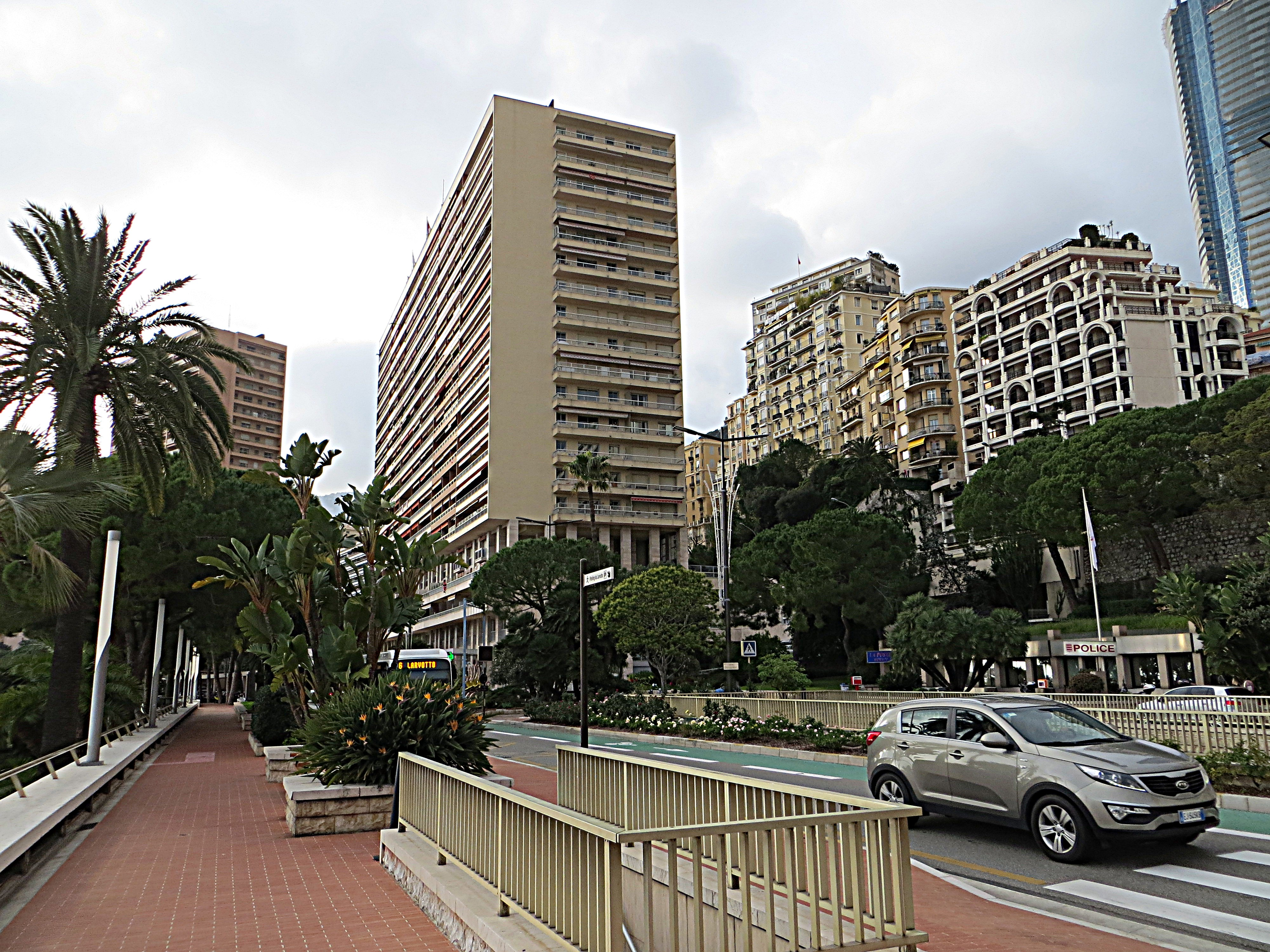
Avenue Princesse Grace in 2015

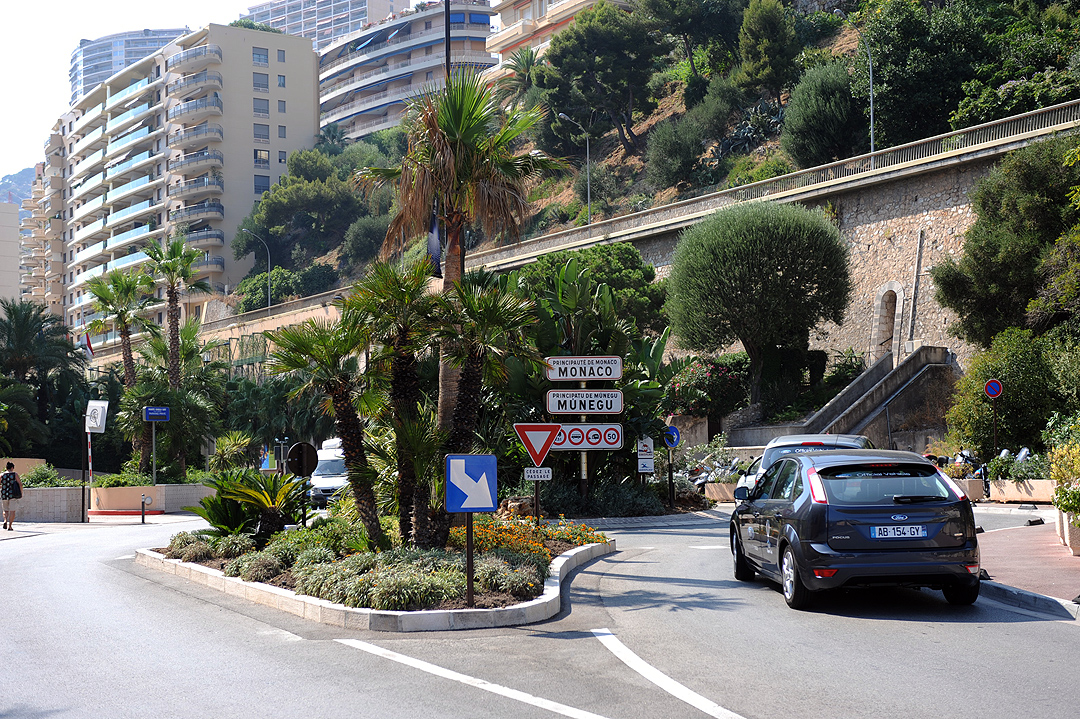
Avenue Princesse Grace viewed from the Monte-Carlo Bay Hotel & Resort at the France–Monaco border

The Avenue Princesse Grace is an avenue in the Larvotto ward of Monaco. It is named after Grace Kelly, Princess consort of Monaco. It is the most expensive street in the world according to Engel & Völkers. Property along the street is on average worth $17,750 per square foot or £73,000 per square metre.

== History ==
Most of the land of the Larvotto district was purchased by Gildo Pastor in the aftermath of World War II. In 1966, Rainier III, Prince of Monaco allowed him to start building high-rise buildings. This led to the construction of dense apartment buildings and luxury hotels starting in the 1960s. Some were built as recently as the 2000s.

== Addresses ==
- 1, Avenue Princesse Grace: Residence Le Mirabeau.
- 2, Avenue Princesse Grace: Le Sardanapale
- 3, Avenue Princesse Grace: Émilie Palace.
- 5, Avenue Princesse Grace: La Réserve
- 7, Avenue Princesse Grace: Le Houston Palace.
- 10, Avenue Princesse Grace: Grimaldi Forum.
- 11, Avenue Princesse Grace: Columbia Palace.
- 17, Avenue Princesse Grace: Villa Sauber, one of two locations of the New National Museum of Monaco.
- 21, avenue Princesse Grace: Le 21.
- 22, Avenue Princesse Grace: Le Méridien Beach Plaza.
- 24, Avenue Princesse Grace: Le Roccabella.
- 26, Avenue Princesse Grace: Sporting Monte-Carlo, home to nightclub Jimmy'z.
- 27, Avenue Princesse Grace: Le Formentor.
- 31, Avenue Princesse Grace: L'Estoril.
- 37, Avenue Princesse Grace: Palais de la Plage.
- 39, Avenue Princesse Grace: Le Bahia.
- 40, Avenue Princesse Grace: Monte-Carlo Bay Hotel & Resort.

There is also public sculpture on the street, called Le Pêcheur.
