= Saint-Charles Church, Monaco =

Coordinates: 43°44′33.58″N 7°25′37.99″E

Saint-Charles Church
- Église Saint-Charles (French); Ge̍ija de San Carlu (Monégasque)
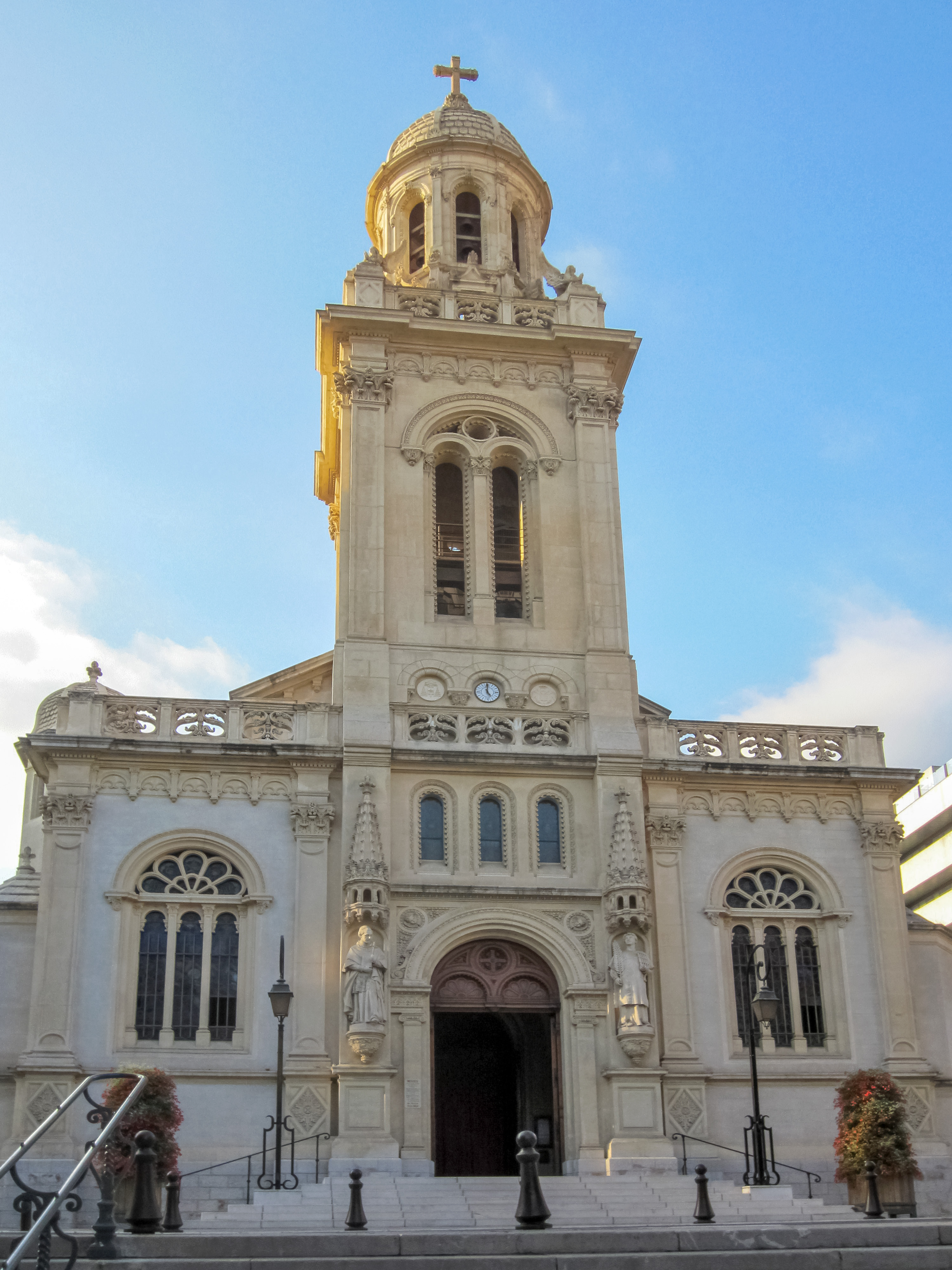
- Saint-Charles Church
- Country: Monaco
- Denomination: Roman Catholic Church
- Website: saintcharles.diocese.mc

History
- Dedicated: March 26, 1883

Saint-Charles Church (French: Église Saint-Charles; Monégasque: Ge̍ija de San Carlu) is a Roman Catholic church dedicated to Saint Charles Borromeo, the 16th-century Italian cardinal and archbishop. The church is situated on the Avenue Sainte-Charles in the Monte Carlo district of Monaco.

The church hosts the only English language Catholic service on the French Riviera, and offers Catechism classes in English for children and adults.

== History ==
In 1879, the Monegasque prince Charles III commissioned the construction of a new church to accommodate the growing population of Monte-Carlo. One of the builders was Italian-born Jean-Baptiste Pastor. The church's dedication to Charles Borromeo highlighted the Borromeo family's historic ties to the Grimaldi family, the ruling family of Monaco. Bishop Charles Theuret of Monaco laid Saint-Charles's corner stone on November 11, 1879; it was completed and opened on Easter Monday, March 26, 1883, and subsequently declared a parish church on March 15, 1887.

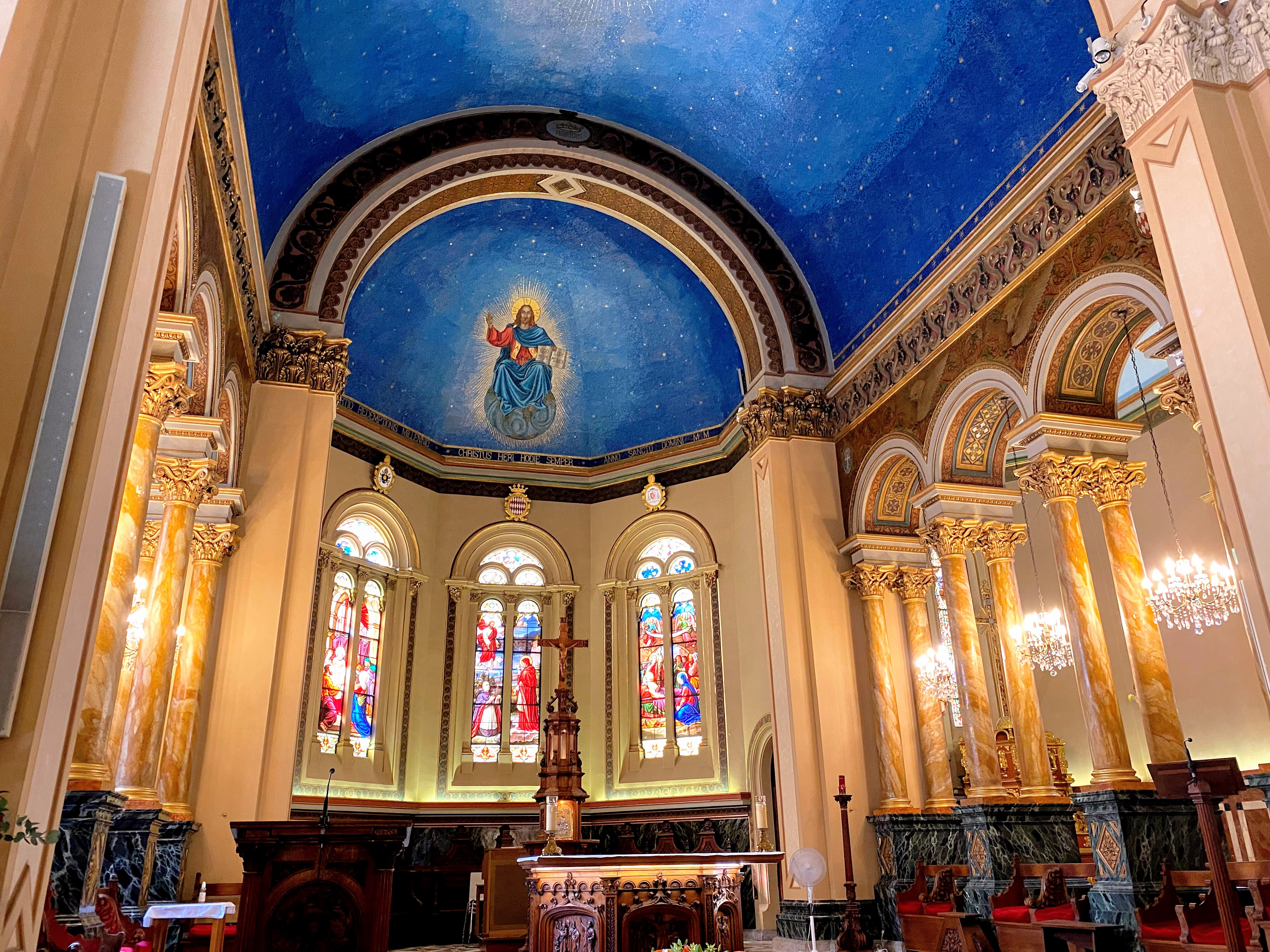
The altar of Saint-Charles church

Theuret's successor, Bishop Jean-Charles Arnal of Curel dedicated the church in 1912. The church was restored and its facades renovated in its centenary year of 1983 by Prince Rainier III, he subsequently oversaw exterior renovation work at the church in 2003.

The family memorial service for the entertainer Josephine Baker took place at Saint-Charles Church in 1975.
