= Wojciech Janowski =

Polish economist and murderer

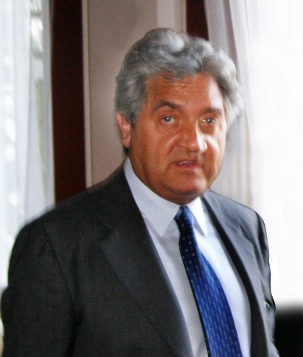
- Janowski in 2010
- Born: 15 August 1949 (age 76); Warsaw, Poland
- Occupations: Businessman, diplomat, philanthropist

Wojciech Janowski (born 15 August 1949) is a Monegasque former businessman, diplomat, and philanthropist. In 2018, he was sentenced to life in prison for ordering the murder of his mother-in-law, Hélène Pastor.

== Early life ==
Wojciech Janowski was born on 15 August 1949 in Warsaw, Poland to an Ashkenazi Jewish family.

== Career ==
Janowski was the manager of hotels and casinos in Monaco. Later, he served as the Chairman of Firmus SAM, a nanotechnology company.

Janowski served as the Chair of the Polish Chamber of Commerce in Monaco. He also served as Poland's honorary consul in Monaco until 2014.

== Philanthropy ==
Janowski is a co-founder of Monaco Against Autism (MONAA). He was a recipient of the National Order of Merit for his philanthropy from French President Nicolas Sarkozy in 2010.

== Personal life ==
Janowski lived with Sylvia Pastor, the daughter of billionaire heiress Hélène Pastor, for 28 years, but they never married.

== Criminal trial and conviction ==
On 6 May 2014, Hélène Pastor and her chauffeur, Mohamed Dariouch, were shot by a gunman while leaving Archet Hospital in Nice, France, where her son Gildo was recuperating from a stroke. Dariouch died on 11 May and Pastor died on 21 May. In June 2014, Janowski admitted to ordering the shooting. However, he initially retracted his confession and said he was not guilty, claiming he was unable to understand the initial questions asked to him in French by police. At the start of the trial in Monaco in 2018, he maintained that he was innocent, but five weeks later, Janowski, through his lawyer, formally admitted to ordering the shooting. The following day, he was sentenced to life in prison.
