= Grimaldi Forum =

Event venue in Monaco

Grimaldi Forum Monaco
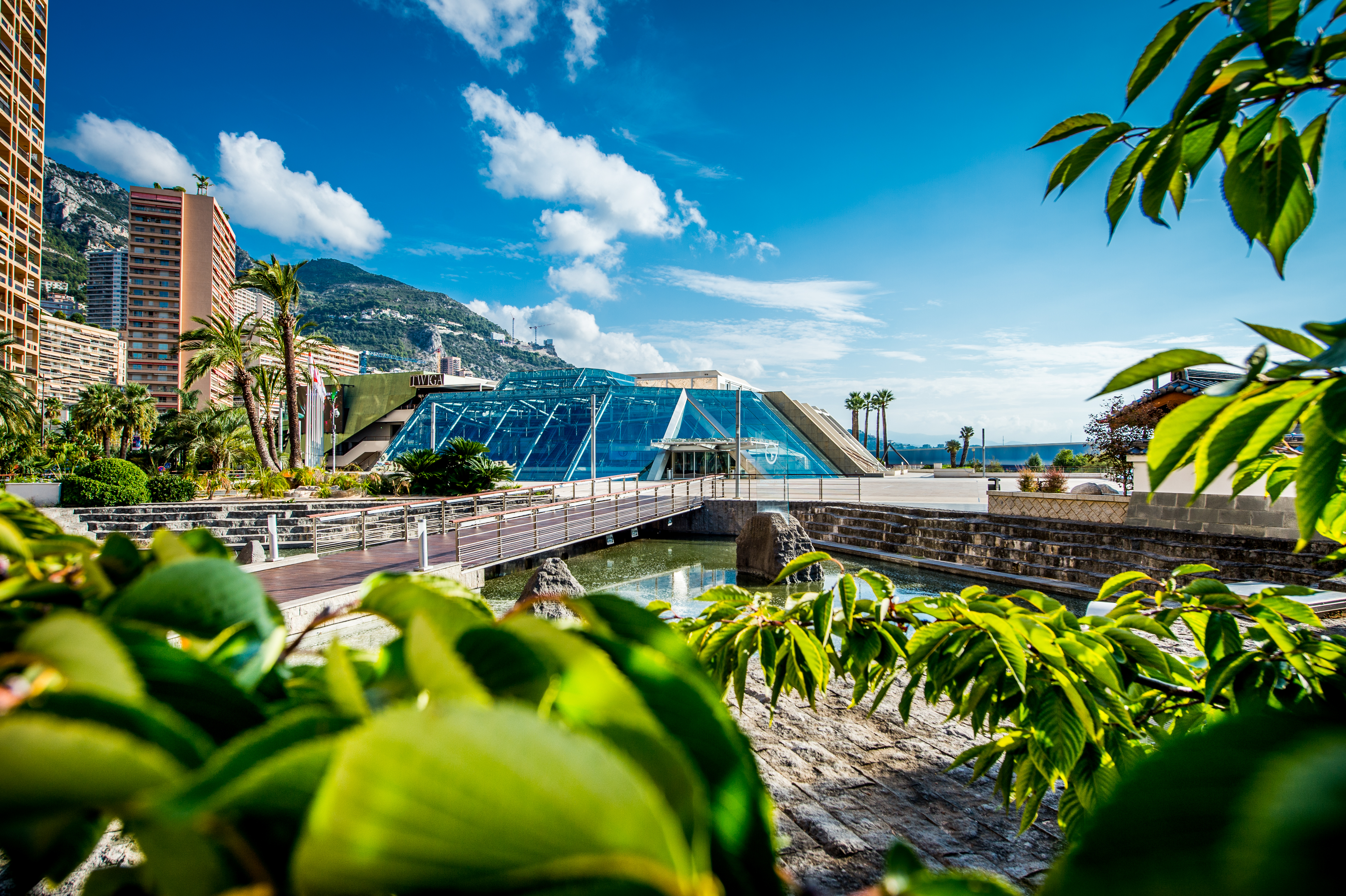
- View toward the venue in 2021
- Interactive map of Grimaldi Forum Monaco
- Address: 10 Avenue Princesse Grace
- Location: Larvotto, Monaco
- Coordinates: 43.743832°N 7.431757°E

Website
- grimaldiforum.com/en

The Grimaldi Forum Monaco, inaugurated in 2000 and named after the historical reigning family of Monaco, the House of Grimaldi, is an international event venue located in the Larvotto ward of Monaco. It hosts approximately 120 events and sees 250,000 visitors annually.

== History ==
The Grimaldi Forum Monaco was inaugurated on 20 July 2000 by Prince Rainier III and Prince Albert II, based on Rainier III's goal of positioning Monaco as a center of European business tourism.

On 16 January 2025, a new 6,000m^{2} extension to the forum, including 2,000m^{2} of outdoor space, was inaugurated by Albert II and Princess Charlene.

== Venue ==
The venue, located within the Larvotto ward, hosts a multitude of events such as seminars, conventions, exhibitions, performances, concerts, and festivals. It comprises two modular halls, three auditoriums (Salle des Princes, Salle Prince Pierre, and Salle Camille Blanc), 22 conference rooms, and three dining spaces and is home to the Monte-Carlo Ballets, the Monte-Carlo Philharmonic Orchestra, the Opéra de Monte-Carlo, the Audiovisual Institute of Monaco, and the Théâtre Princesse Grace. It regularly hosts events including the Monte-Carlo Arts Festival, the Monte-Carlo Television Festival, EVER Monaco, Top Marques Monaco, as well as UEFA Champions League and UEFA Europa League events.

== Notable events and exhibitions ==
In 2023, the Grimaldi Forum hosted an art exhibition titled Monet in Full Light, which featured nearly 100 artworks by Impressionist painter Claude Monet, highlighting paintings he created during his trip to the French Riviera. Having received nearly 120,000 visitors, it was the most visited event ever hosted at the forum.

In 2024, the Grimaldi Forum hosted an art exhibition called Turner, the Sublime Legacy, organized in partnership with the Tate and support from CMB Monaco, Sotheby's, and the Marzocco Group, featured 80 paintings and drawings by J. M. W. Turner and 30 works by contemporary artists. It was among the top five most-visited exhibitions at the Grimaldi Forum.

== Gallery ==
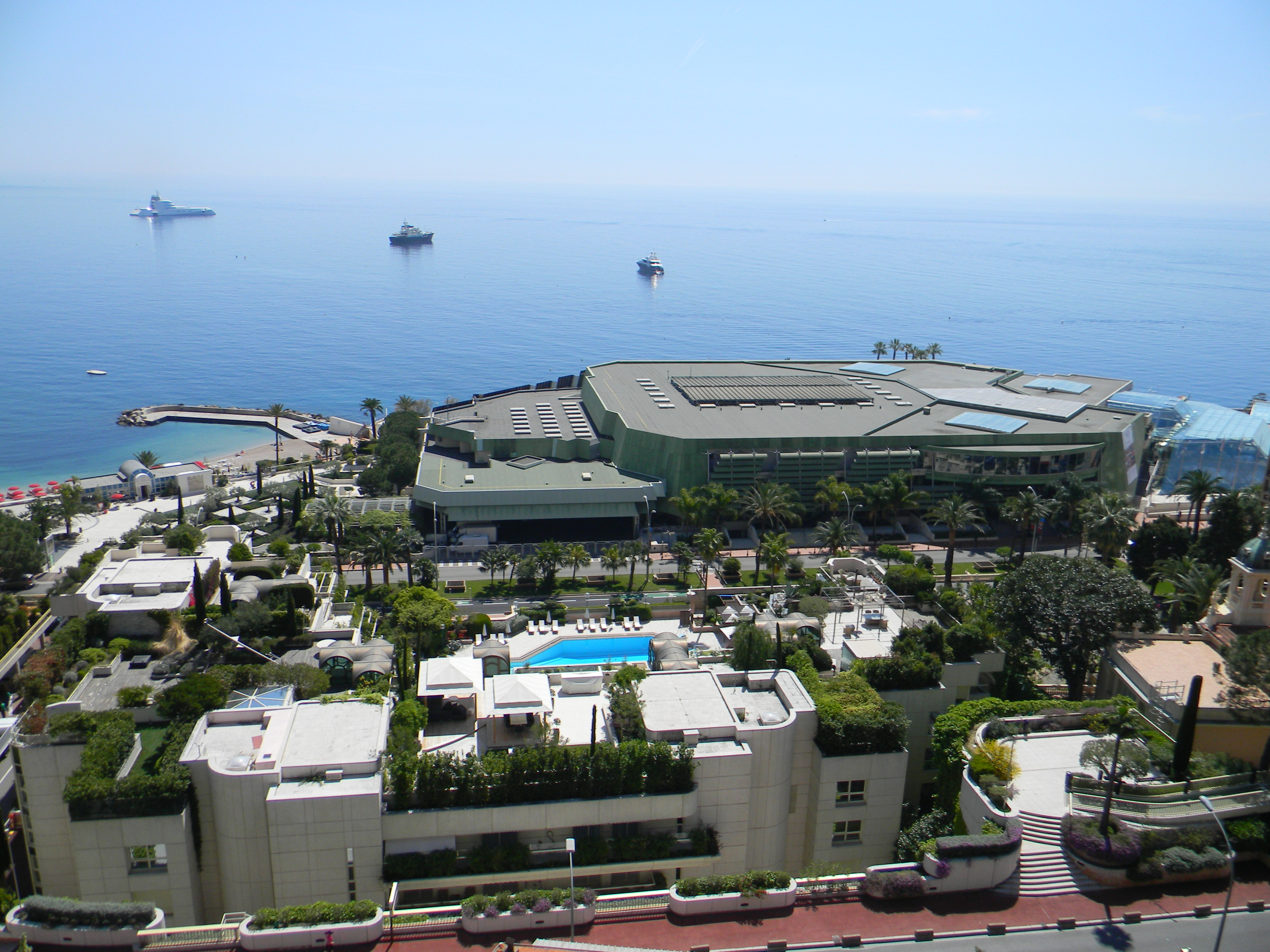
Overview of the complex in 2012

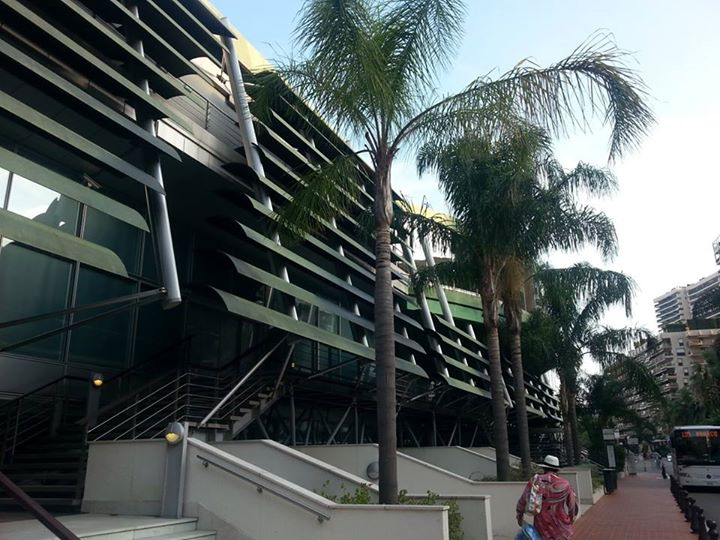
Side view from Avenue Princesse Grace

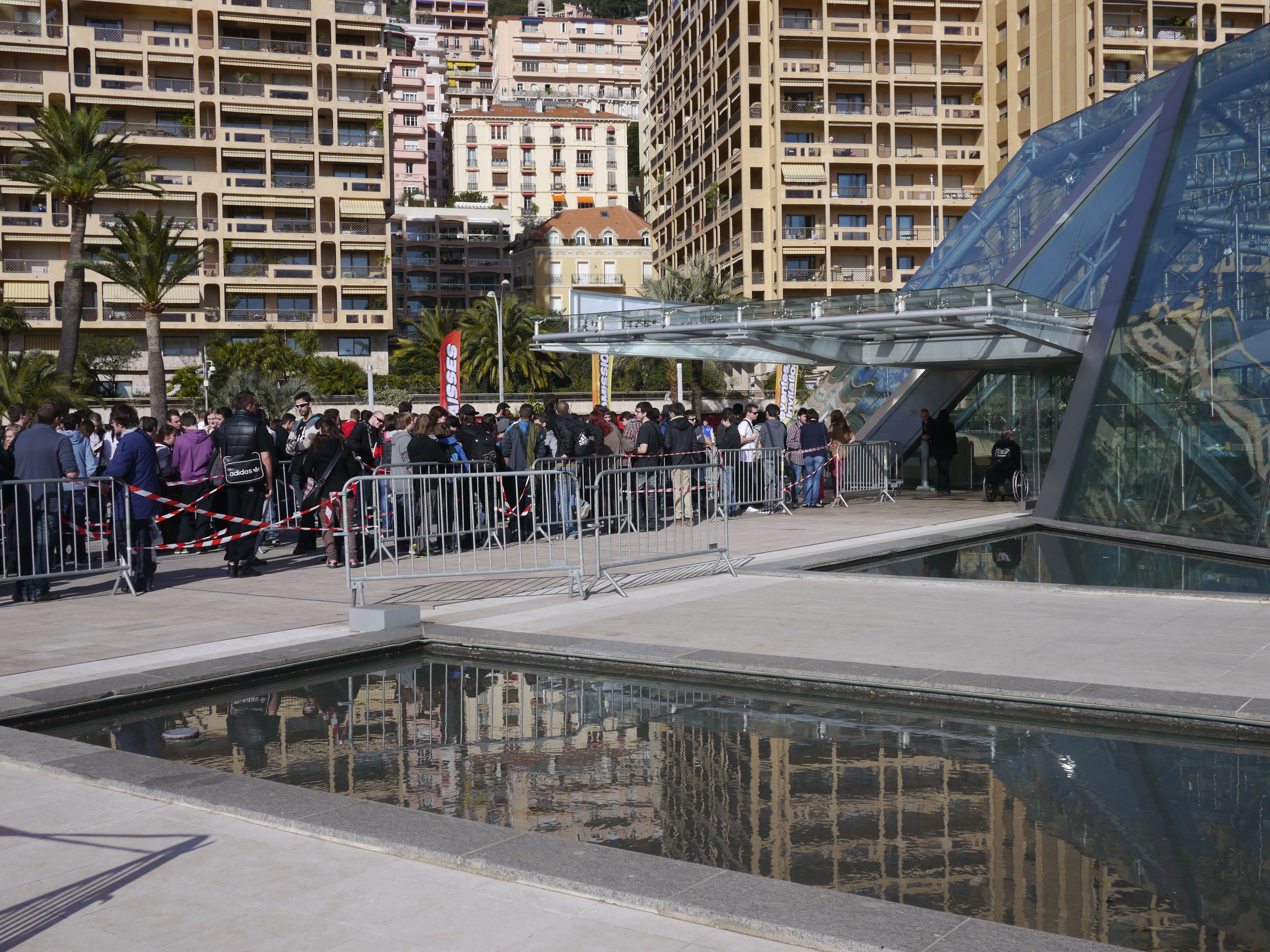
Monaco Anime Game Show Festival, 2013

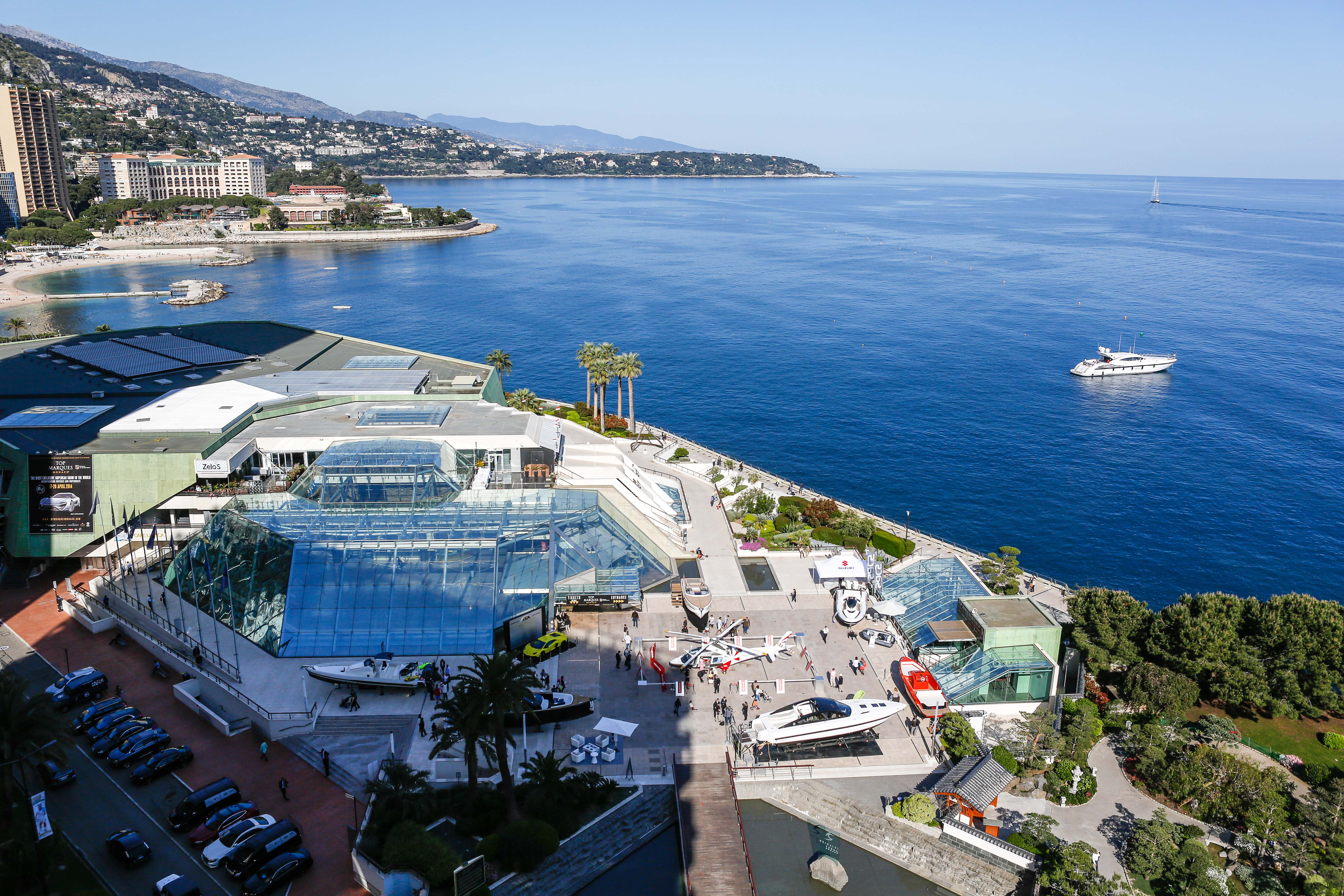
Top Marques Monaco, 2016

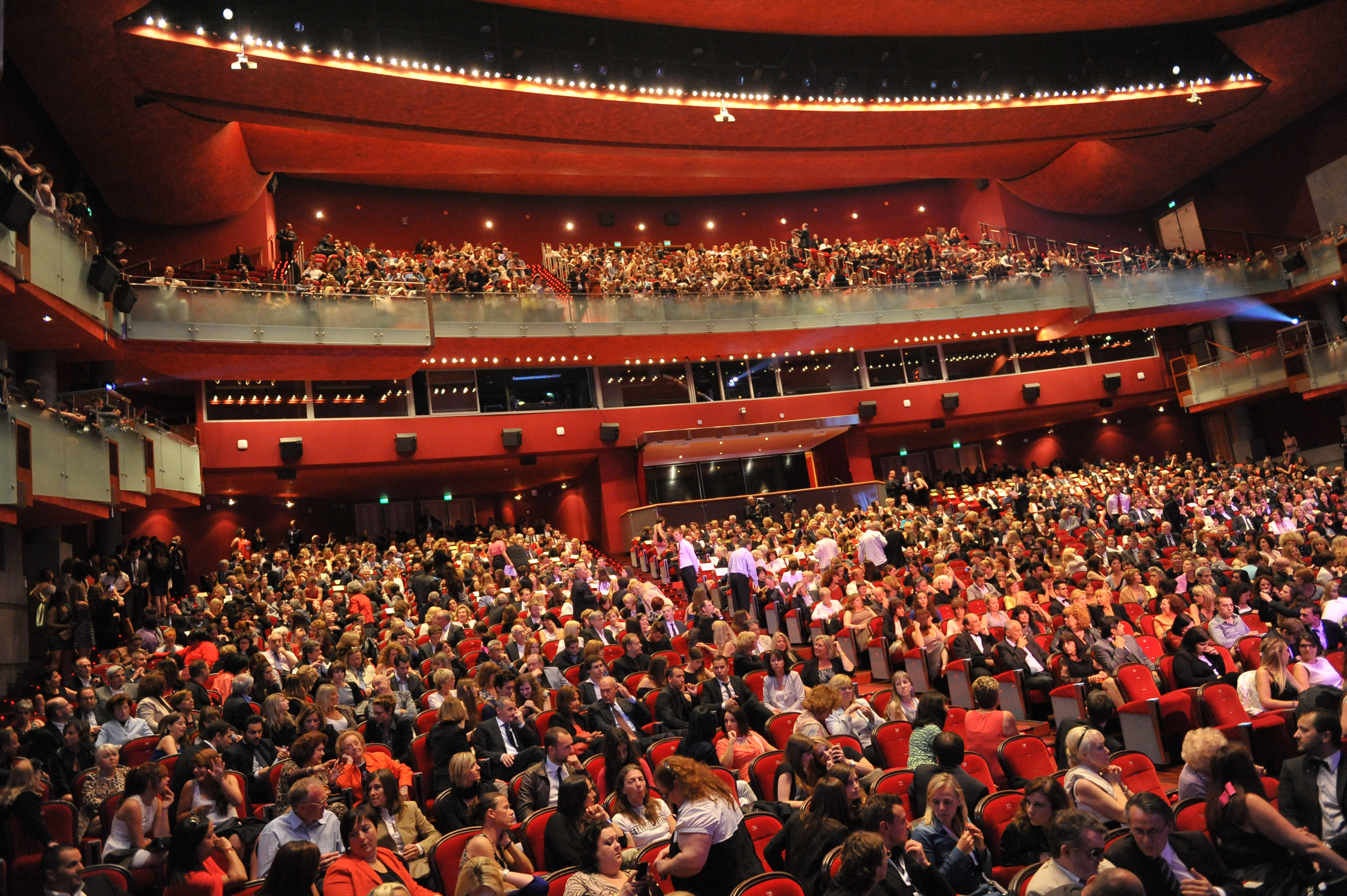
Salle des Princes

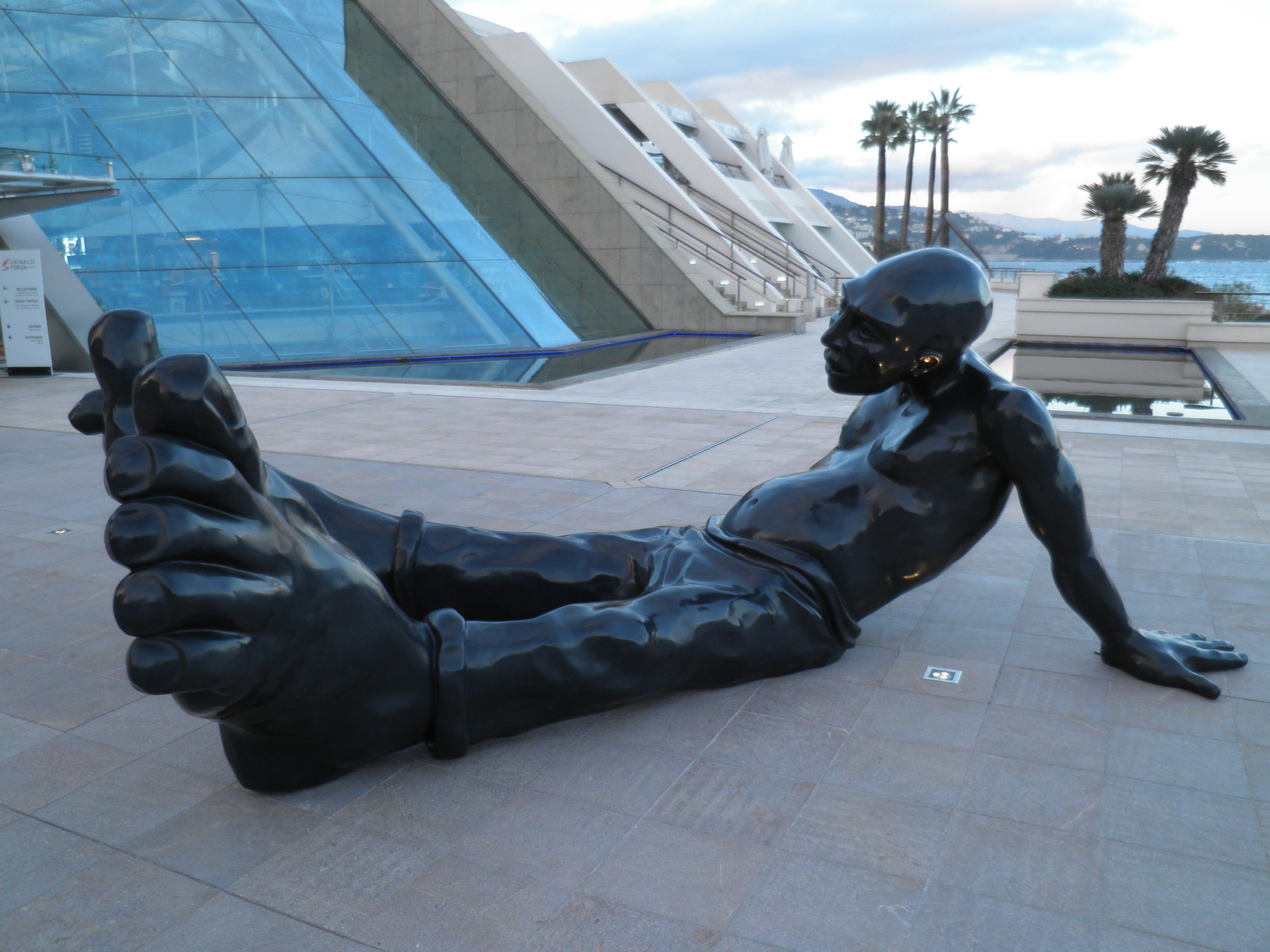

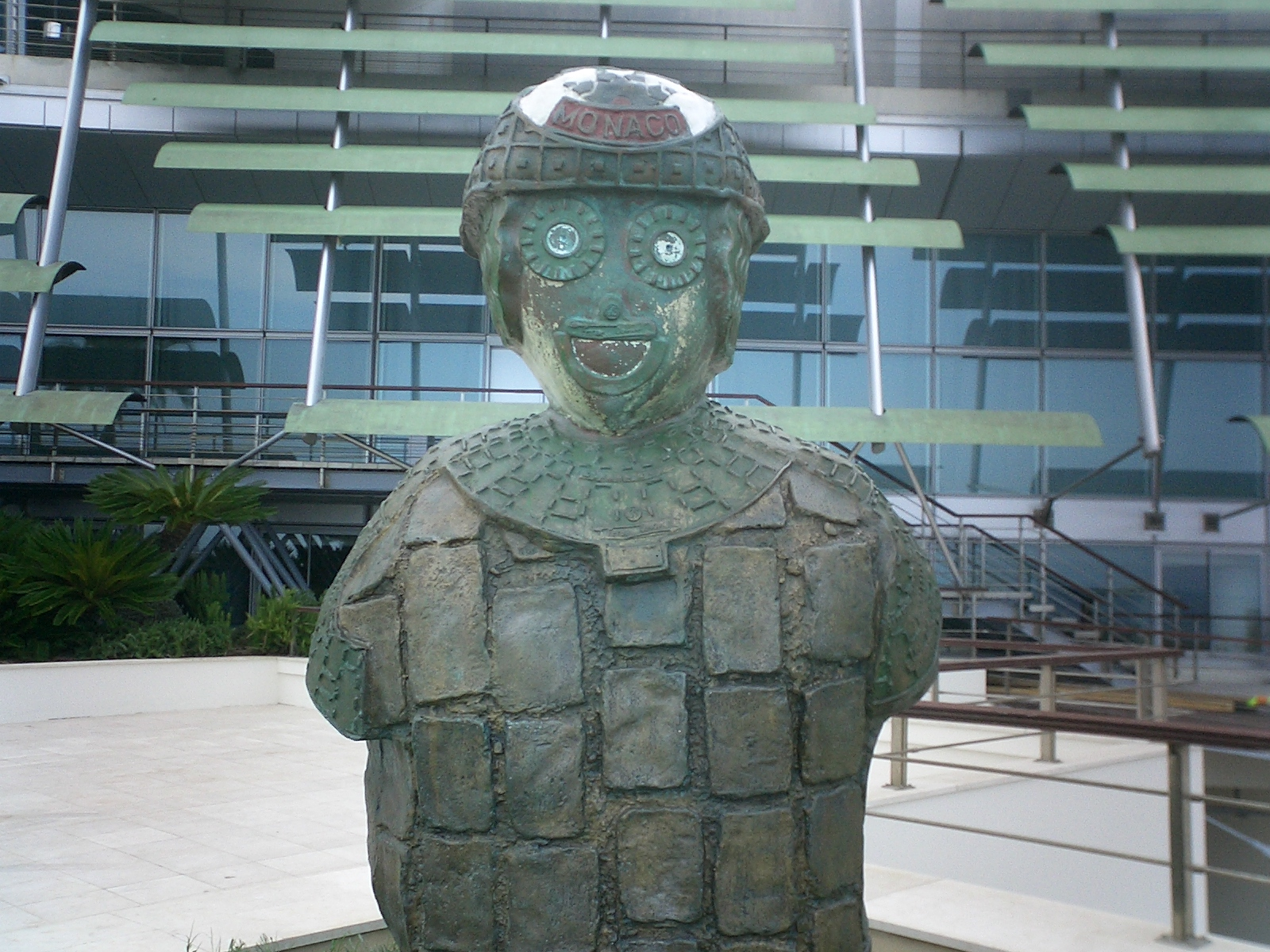

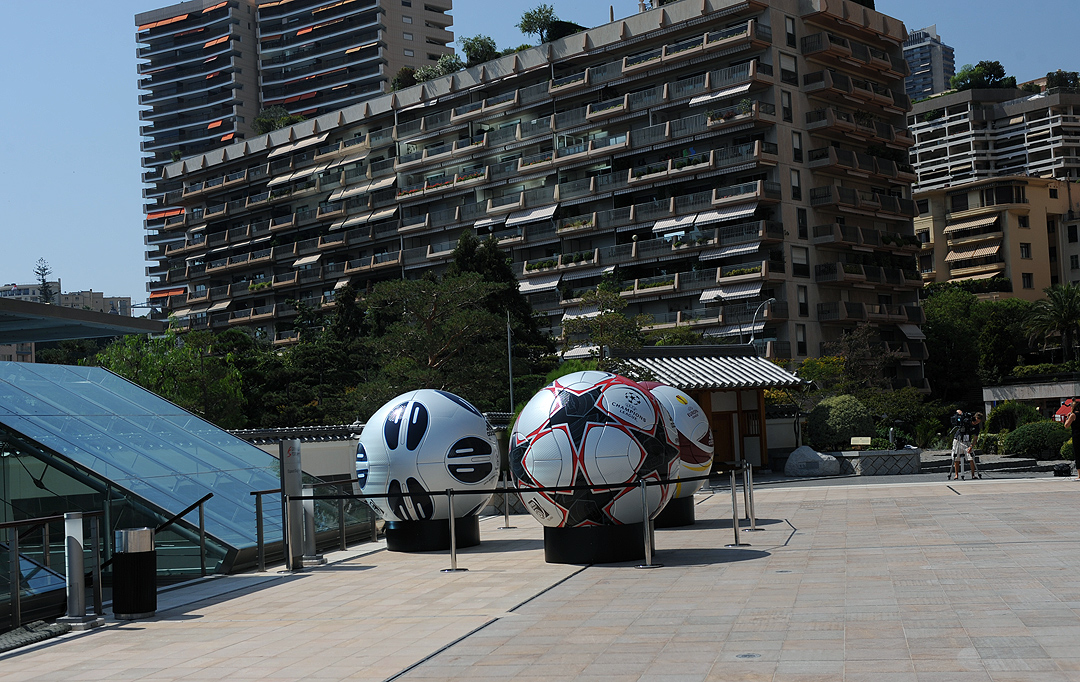
