= Audiovisual Institute of Monaco =

Audiovisual archive in Monte Carlo

- Industry: Audiovisual
- Predecessor: Association of the Audiovisual Archives
- Founded: 1997; 28 years ago
- Website: institut-audiovisuel.mc

The Audiovisual Institute of Monaco (Institut Audiovisuel de Monaco) is a Monegasque organization aimed to list, gather, restore, conserve, protect, share and promote audiovisual archives. The Institute proposes to show how the Principality of Monaco is represented in cinema, and to give a better cross reading of history. Audiovisual Institute of Monaco aims to raise public awareness about the need to use and conserve film as an historic, cultural and educational resource. The director of the Audiovisual Institute of Monaco is Vatrican Vincent.

== History ==
The Audiovisual Institute of Monaco was founded in 1997 as the Association of the Audiovisual Archives of the Principality of Monaco, and renamed to its current name in August 2018. In September 2020 the Institute opened to the public of Monaco nearly two years after its move to Boulevard du Jardin Exotique. The new building of the Audiovisual Institute was inaugurated by Prince Albert and Princess Caroline.

In 2020, during the COVID-19 pandemic, the Audiovisual Institute of Monaco made available some snapshots shot in 1950s and 1960s.

The Audiovisual Institute of Monaco joined forces with the National Audiovisual Institute (INA) of France to expand access to its audiovisual archives via the INA mediapro platform. Almost 4,200 subjects broadcast on the “Monaco Info” channel between 1995 and 1997 are now accessible on the platform.
