= Gildo Pastor =

Monegasque businessman

- Born: 6 October 1910; Monaco
- Died: 21 October 1990 (aged 80); Monaco
- Occupation: Businessman
- Spouse: Émilie Brianti
- Children: Victor Pastor; Hélène Pastor; Michel Pastor
- Parent(s): Jean-Baptiste Pastor; Marie Borfiga
- Relatives: Philippe Pastor (grandson)

Gildo Pastor (6 October 1910 – 21 October 1990) was a businessman and property developer born in Monaco as the son of Jean-Baptiste Pastor, a stonemason from Liguria in Italy, who immigrated to Monte Carlo as a young man in the 1880s. He was educated at the Public Works School. In 1950, he became the Lebanese consul in Monaco.

After World War II, Pastor acquired oceanfront land at low prices, and in the 1950s, he started building apartment blocks. The Pastor family eventually owned some 3,000 apartments, 15% of Monaco's total housing stock, worth about €20 billion.

Pastor married Émilie Brianti on 27 April 1936. They lived in Monaco and had three children: Victor Pastor, Hélène Pastor, and Michel Pastor.

The Gildo Pastor Center in Fontvieille, Monaco, was named after him.
