= Larvotto =

Larvotto Larvotu (Monégasque)
- Ward of Monaco
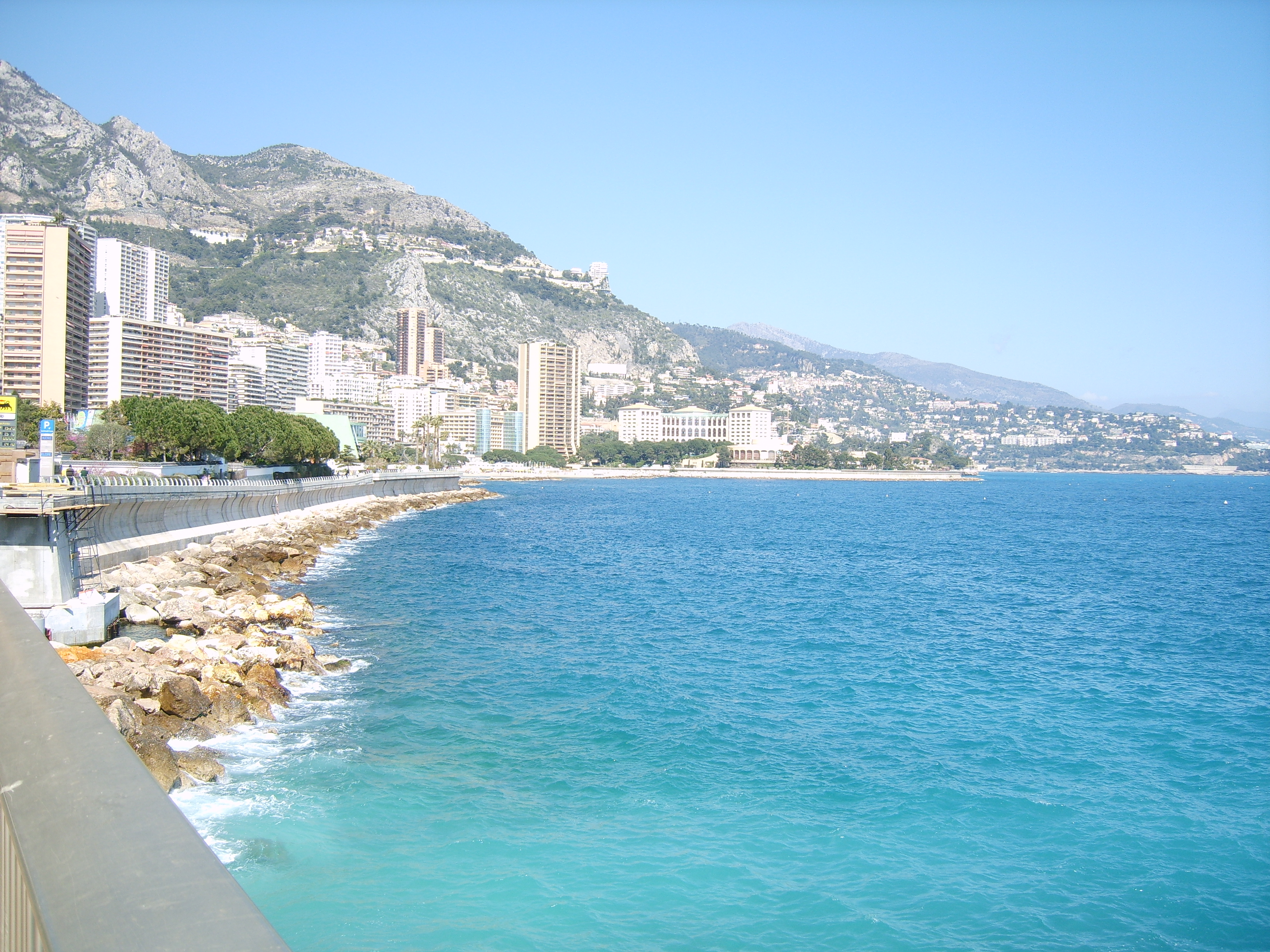
- Coastline

- Location in Monaco

- Location in relation to France
- Coordinates: 43°44′48″N 7°26′00″E
- Country: Monaco

Area
  - Total: 27.5 ha (68 acres)

Population (2008)
  - Total: 5,443
  - Density: 23,360/km^{2} (60,500/sq mi)

Larvotto (French: Le Larvotto [lə laʁvɔto]; Monégasque: Larvotu [laɾˈvɔtu]), also known as Larvotto/Bas Moulins, is the easternmost ward in the Principality of Monaco. It is part of the quarter of Monte Carlo. With the addition of Le Portier, a neighbourhood reclaimed from the sea and opened in 2024, the surface area increased from 21.8 to 27.5 hectares. In 2008, it had a population of 5.443, making it the most populated ward in Monaco.

== Geography ==
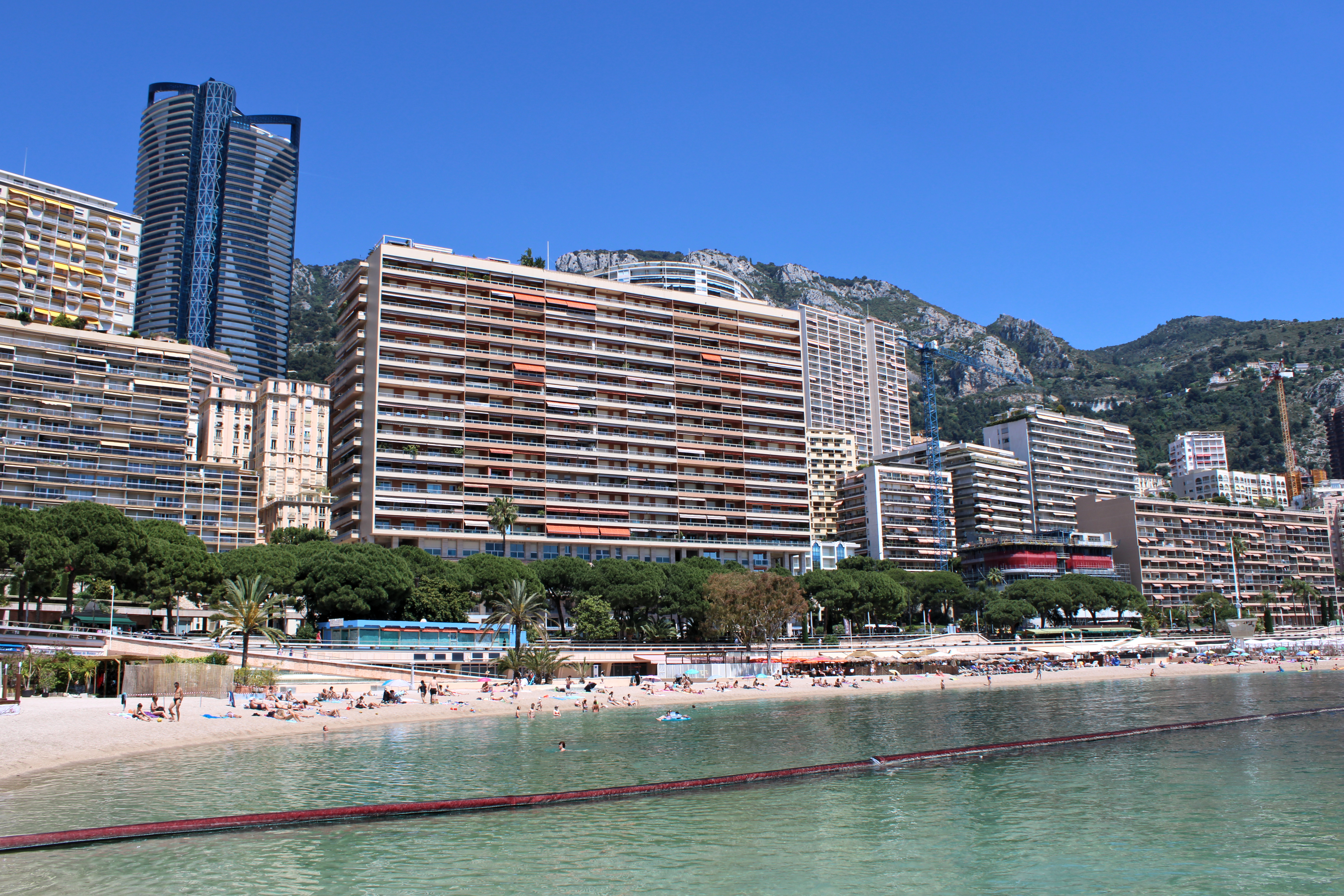
Larvotto Promenade

Larvotto is northeast of Monte Carlo and La Rousse. It borders Roquebrune-Cap-Martin, Provence-Alpes-Côte d'Azur, France, to the northeast.

The Grimaldi Forum, a conference and congress centre, is located on the seafront of Larvotto.

Avenue Princesse Grace, located alongside Larvotto Beach, was the world's most expensive street to live on. The average apartment was $6,970 per square foot ($75,000/m^{2}). The Japanese Garden is a municipal park on the Avenue Princesse Grace.

=== Fauna and flora ===
At the end of 2016, to prepare the seabed for the construction of the new neighborhood called Le Portier, posidonia plates and lithophilic rocks were transplanted to the Larvotto seabed. Some 47 large Nacres were also moved to the Larvotto seabed.

=== Demography ===
Le Larvotto is the most densely populated district of the principality, and the second largest, after Fontvieille. The quality of life, due in part to the large number of parks, makes Larvotto a very popular walking area for both Monegasque and foreign tourists. This explains why property prices are between 10% and 20% higher than in the neighbouring districts.

=== Submarine reserve ===
The Larvotto and Portier Coastal Reserve is a Ramsar zone of about 0.23 km² consisting of a coastal area with a rocky bottom about 10 meters deep in the western part. In the eastern part of the reserve there are beaches and artificial rocky protection works with important Posidonia oceanica meadows. The area is an ideal refuge for the different species of fish in the area. Although there are development projects near the western part, the protected beaches are only used for recreational activities. The coastal waters of the reserve are closed to tourism and serve as a place for limited environmental education and as a base for numerous scientific studies.

== Tourism ==
Despite its predominantly residential character, the district includes several hotels, as well as the Sporting Monte-Carlo. The last Monegasque beach accessible to the public is there (since the closure of the "Portier" beach).

== Trivia ==
Larvotto, including the outside views of Monte-Carlo Bay Hotel & Resort, was a filming location for a music video by singer Yuri Shatunov for the song "Тет а тет".

== Notable residents ==
- Philip Green; English businessman (in the Roccabella high-rise on Avenue Princesse Grace)
- Shirley Bassey; Welsh singer (in the Roccabella high-rise on Avenue Princesse Grace)
- Thor Hushovd; Norwegian cyclist

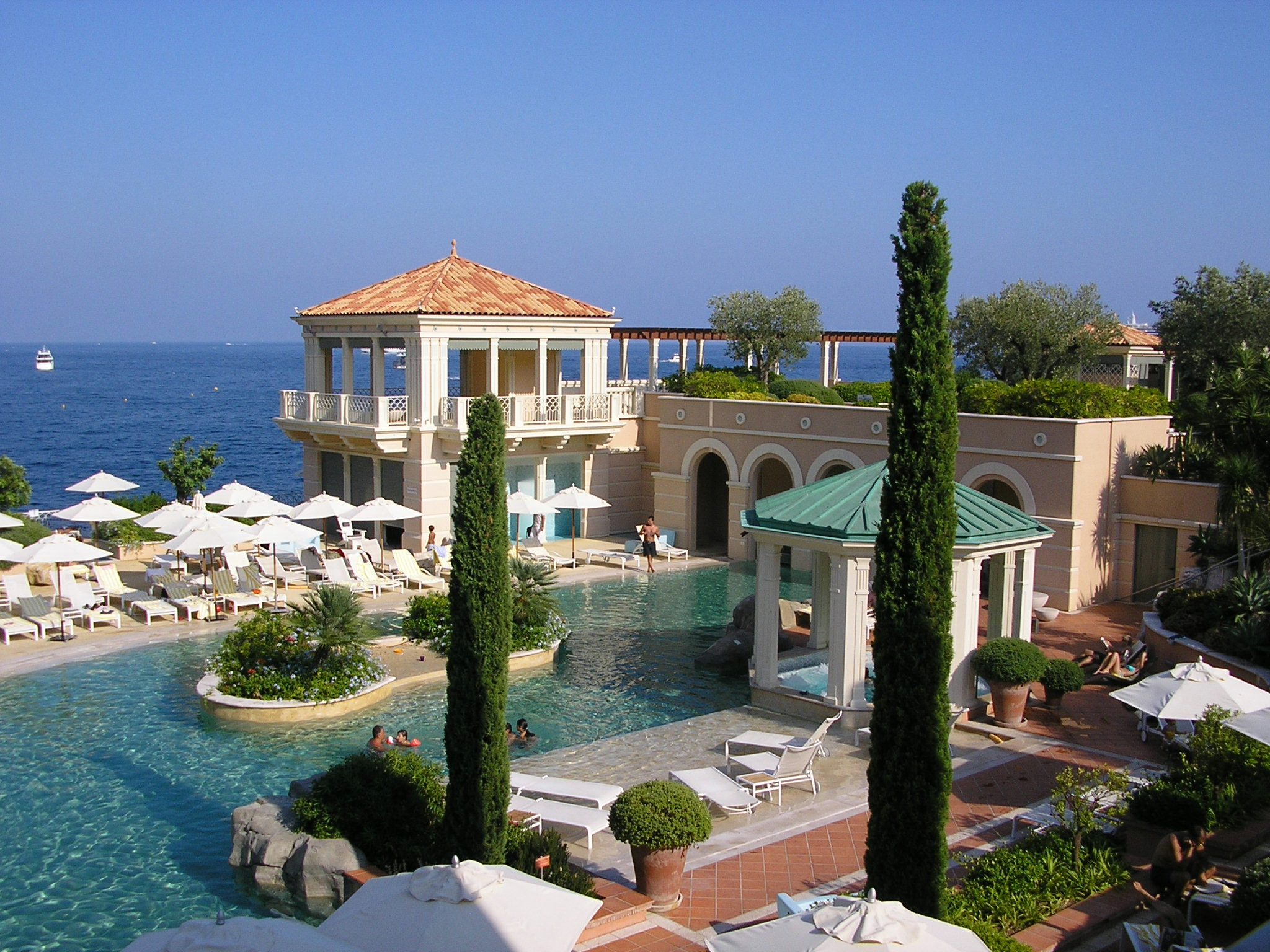
Monte Carlo Bay Hotel, Larvotto

== See also ==
- Municipality of Monaco
