= List of Monegasque people =

List of people from Monaco

This is a list of people from Monaco.

- Romeo Acquarone (1895–1980), tennis player
- Olivier Beretta (born 1969), Formula One racing driver
- Louis Chiron (1899–1979), Formula One racing driver
- Daniel Elena (born 1972), rally co-driver
- Charles Leclerc (born 1997), Formula One racing driver
- Arthur Leclerc (born 2000), racing driver
- Laetitia Mikail (born 1980s), lawyer and event planner
- Serge Perruchini (born 1955), former footballer
- Anne Poyard-Vatrican, politician
- Maurice Revelli (born 1964), former professional footballer
- Georges Vigarello (born 1941), historian and sociologist
- Valentin Vacherot (born 1998), tennis player

== See also ==
- Category:Monegasque people
- List of Monégasque consorts
- List of Monegasques by net worth
- List of flag bearers for Monaco at the Olympics
