= Challenge Prince Rainier III =

Football tournament in Monaco

- Organiser(s): Monégasque Football Federation
- Founded: 1975; 51 years ago
- Region: Monaco
- Current champions: Monte Carlo SBM (23rd title) (2025–26)
- Most championships: Monte Carlo SBM (23 titles)
- Website: Official website
- 2025–26 Challenge Prince Rainier III

The Challenge Prince Rainier III is a domestic football cup in Monaco, featuring teams from across the country. The tournament has been organised annually since 1975 and since then has been known as the premier footballing tournament for amateur teams within the principality.

Because Monaco is not a member of UEFA, there is no qualification for the winners into either the UEFA Champions League, UEFA Europa League, or UEFA Conference League.

== History ==
The tournament was created in 1975 after Prince Rainier III requested a footballing tournament in the country be played.

President of the Organizing Committee, Joseph Destefanis, recalled how the only football game of the year had an air of folklore among the players and of the palace of Monaco. At the time the teams were completed and at the request of Prince Rainier III, the competition has grown.

== Format ==
In the first round of the competition, the teams are placed into groups for a round-robin stage. The best teams from these groups progress to the knockout rounds of the Challenge Prince Rainier III. The lower teams from each group then qualify for the knockout stages of the Trophée Ville de Monaco, the second level cup in Monaco underneath the Challenge Prince Rainier III.

== Current clubs ==
Map of the location of the stadiums used in the tournament.

- Monaco
- 1 Stade Louis II
- France
- 2 Stade Didier Deschamps
- 3 Stade des Moneghetti (football field)

These are the current clubs for the 2026 season:

- Monte-Carlo S.B.M.
- Barbagiuans
- Hôpital de Monaco
- Carabiniers du Prince
- Sûreté Publique
- Mairie de Monaco
- OBBA Sport Munegu
- Seleçiun Futbol 7

== Champions ==
| Season | Champions (number of titles) |
Challenge Prince Rainier III
| 1976 | SBM Jeux (1) |
| 1977 | SBM Loews Jeux (2) |
| 1978 | SBM Loews Jeux (3) |
| 1979 | Palais Princier (1) |
| 1980 | Not held |
| 1981 | Banque Sudaméris (1) |
| 1982 | SBM Loews Jeux (4) |
| 1983 | Not held |
| 1984 | SBM Loews Jeux (5) |
| 1985 | SBM Loews Jeux (6) |
| 1986 | SBM Loews Jeux (7) |
| 1987 | SBM Loews Jeux (8) |
| 1988 | Palais Princier (2) |
| 1989 | Palais Princier (3) |
| 1990 | SBM Loews Jeux (9) |
| 1991 | Loews Hotel (10) |
| 1992 | Café de Paris (1) |

| Season | Champions (number of titles) |
|---|---|
| 1993 | Sun Casino (Note: Loews Hotel renamed after their casino complex.) (11) |
| 1994 | Café de Paris (2) |
| 1995 | Hôpital (1) |
| 1996 | GEM Bâtiment (1) |
| 1997 | GEM Bâtiment (2) |
| 1998 | GEM Bâtiment (3) |
| 1999 | GEM Bâtiment (4) |
| 2000 | Sun Casino (12) |
| 2001 | GEM Bâtiment (5) |
| 2002 | Sun Casino (13) |
| 2003 | Sun Casino (14) |
| 2004 | Ribeiro Frères (1) |
| 2005 | Sun Casino (15) |
| 2006 | Sun Casino (16) |
| 2007 | Sun Casino (17) |
| 2008 | Sofamo Biotherm (1) |
| 2009 | Sun Casino (18) |
| 2010 | Sun Casino (19) |

| Season | Champions (number of titles) |
|---|---|
| 2011 | Sun Casino (20) |
| 2012 | La Poste Monte Carlo (1) |
| 2013 | Sun Casino (21) |
| 2014 | MR Concept (1) |
| 2015 | Ribeiro Frères (2) |
| 2016 | Ribeiro Frères (3) |
| 2017 | MR Concept (2) |
| 2018 | Hôpital (2) |
| 2019 | MI Monaco (1) |
| 2020 | Vinci Construction (1) |
| 2021 | Cancelled |
| 2022 | Carabiniers du Prince (1) |
| 2023 | MI Monaco (2) |
| 2024 | Monte Carlo SBM (Note: Casino renamed after their operators - Monte Carlo SBM.) (22) |
| 2025 | Carabiniers du Prince (2) |
| 2026 | Monte Carlo SBM (23) |

=== By numbers of wins ===
| Club | Wins | Winning years |
|---|---|---|
| Monte Carlo SBM | 23 | 1976, 1977, 1978, 1982, 1984, 1985, 1986, 1987, 1990, 1991, 1993, 2000, 2002, 2003, 2005, 2006, 2007, 2009, 2010, 2011, 2013, 2024, 2026 |
| GEM Bâtiment | 5 | 1996, 1997, 1988, 1999, 2001 |
| Ribeiro Frères | 3 | 2004, 2015, 2016 |

== See also ==
- Challenge Monégasque
- Trophée Ville de Monaco
- Football in Monaco
- List of football clubs in Monaco
