= Revelli =

Revelli is an Italian surname. Notable people of this name include the following:

- Filippo Antonio Revelli (1716–1801), Italian mathematician
- Hervé Revelli (born 1946), French football player and manager
- Maurice Revelli (born 1964), Monegasque footballer
- Nuto Revelli (1919–2004), Italian essayist and partisan
- Paolo Revelli (born 1959), Italian swimmer
- Patrick Revelli (born 1951), French footballer
- Romain Revelli (born 1977), French football player and manager
- William Revelli (1902–1994), American music educator and conductor

== See also ==
- Fiat–Revelli Modello 1914, Italian machine gun
- Fiat–Revelli Modello 1935, Italian machine gun
