= Monégasque Football Federation =

Governing body of football in the nation of Monaco

- Founded: 27 April 2000
- Headquarters: Monaco
- FIFA affiliation: Not a member
- President: Franck Brasseur

The Monégasque Football Federation (French: Fédération Monégasque de Football) is the governing body of football in the nation of Monaco. The association is not a member of FIFA or UEFA, and it was previously a member of the NF-Board until 2010.

The FMF runs the national football team and the three domestic cup tournaments played in the principality.

== Organization ==
The Monégasque Football Federation was founded in 2000 and accepted by the country's government on 27 April. There is a small board of six people of Monégasque descent who are elected for four year terms to run the organisation. They aim to allow their members to play football together and organize friendlies.

== Tournaments ==
As well as administering the national team, the Monegasque Football Federation also organises three domestic cup competitions in the principality:

- Challenge Prince Rainier III - the most prestigious cup in Monaco.
- Trophée Ville de Monaco - the second level competition in the country.
- Challenge Monégasque - the third most important competition in Monaco.

== See also ==
- Football in Monaco
- Monaco national football team
- Challenge Prince Rainier III
- Trophée Ville de Monaco
- Challenge Monégasque
- List of football clubs in Monaco
