= Football in Monaco =

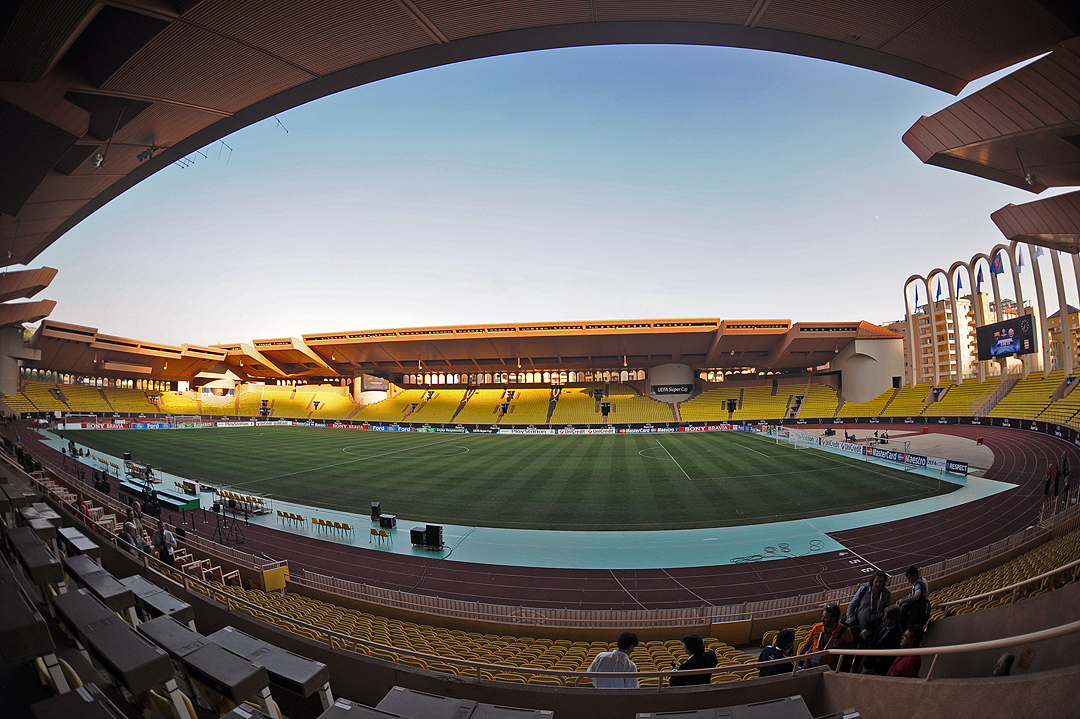
- Stade Louis II is the home stadium of the club AS Monaco.
- Country: Monaco
- Governing body: FMF
- National team: Monaco
- First played: 1919; 107 years ago
- Clubs: 1

Club competitions
- List: Cups: Challenge Prince Rainier III Trophée Ville de Monaco Challenge Monégasque

Principality of Monaco

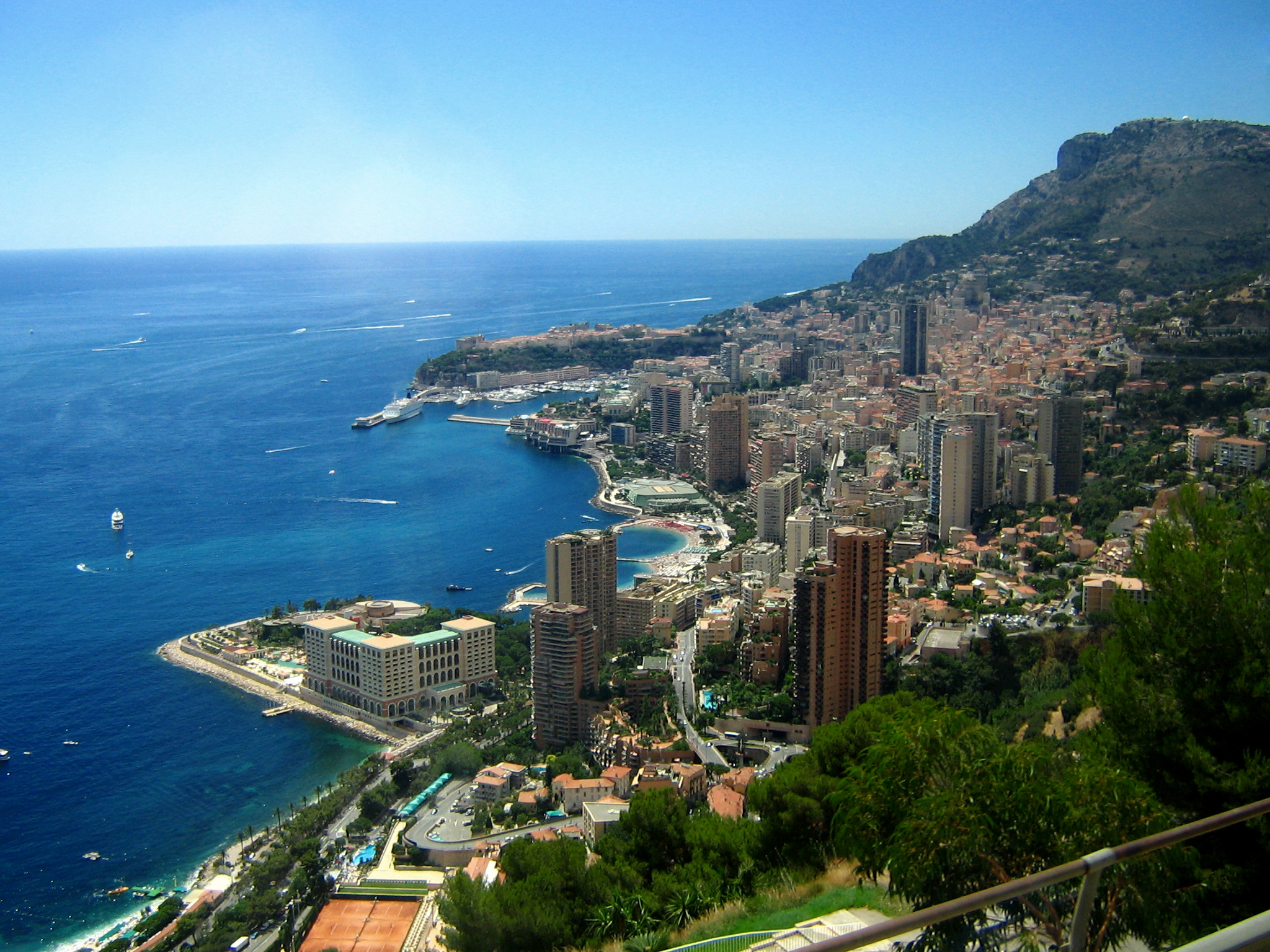
Monaco is one of the few sovereign states not to be members of FIFA.

Football is the most popular sport in the small Principality of Monaco, enjoying large popularity alongside motor racing, yachting and tennis. It is governed by the Monegasque Football Federation.

== International football ==
Monaco is one of two sovereign European states (along with the Vatican City) that is not a UEFA member and does not have a national team competing in UEFA Euro qualifiers or FIFA World Cup qualifiers. The cause of this may be the historically close ties to France, but this is also true of Andorra, while they have their own separate team. It may be purely because Monaco have never applied to join UEFA, despite fulfilling all the required criteria. In recent years, there has reportedly been more interest in achieving this status.

The Monaco national team instead tend to play small-scale matches against non-FIFA members, usually across the border in Cap-d'Ail.

== Domestic football ==
=== Club football ===
Domestic football within the principality is governed by the Monegasque Football Federation, founded in 2000.

==== AS Monaco ====
Football in Monaco is dominated by AS Monaco, who were founded in 1919 and play in the French Ligue 1, which they have won on eight occasions, also winning five French Cups in the process. The club have traditionally been heavily backed by the monarchy, with large financial support which helps the club compete with teams from much larger cities. The club plays at the Stade Louis II, where average attendances have sometimes been as low as 5,000 demonstrating the need for financial aid to compete with teams who draw crowds several times that figure.

In 2004, they were runners-up in the UEFA Champions League to FC Porto, widely regarded as the most prestigious club tournament in world-wide football. Their success and the large financial subsidy they receive has caused occasional bad feelings; it has been proposed, often by rival clubs in the Ligue 1, that AS Monaco should not be allowed to qualify for European competition from the French League, thereby taking a place allocated for a French team, with some even suggesting they should be expelled from French football altogether.

One compromise that has been suggested is that AS Monaco continue to play in the French League system, but take part in a yearly qualifying tournament to earn the right to represent Monaco in European competition, as football teams in Canada do by the Canadian Championship. This solution would require the Principality to gain full or associate member status of UEFA first.

On 4 February 2022, AS Monaco passed the 20 million social media fan mark, which is the 16th largest in Europe.

=== Attendances ===
The attendances of AS Monaco in the French Ligue 1:

| Season | Average | Highest |
|---|---|---|
| 2024–25 | 9,354 | 14,250 |
| 2023–24 | 7,518 | 14,700 |

=== Domestic cups ===
Despite the small size of the country, Monaco still has many teams (mostly works teams, set up by employers or employees of a company), and they compete yearly in different competitions, which are:

- Challenge Prince Rainier III - the most prestigious cup in Monaco.
- Trophée Ville de Monaco - the second level competition in the country.
- Challenge Monégasque - the third most important competition in Monaco.

== Super Cup ==
Previously Monaco hosted the UEFA Super Cup between the winners of the UEFA Champions League and the UEFA Cup. UEFA announced that from 2013 onwards, various stadiums will be used for the Super Cup.

== Football stadiums in Monaco ==
| Stadium | Capacity | City | Club | Image |
|---|---|---|---|---|
| Stade Louis II | 18,523 | Monaco | AS Monaco | |

== See also ==
- AS Monaco
- List of football clubs in Monaco
- Monaco national football team
- Challenge Prince Rainier III
- Lists of stadiums
- Non-FIFA international football
