= Challenge Monégasque =

Football tournament in Monaco

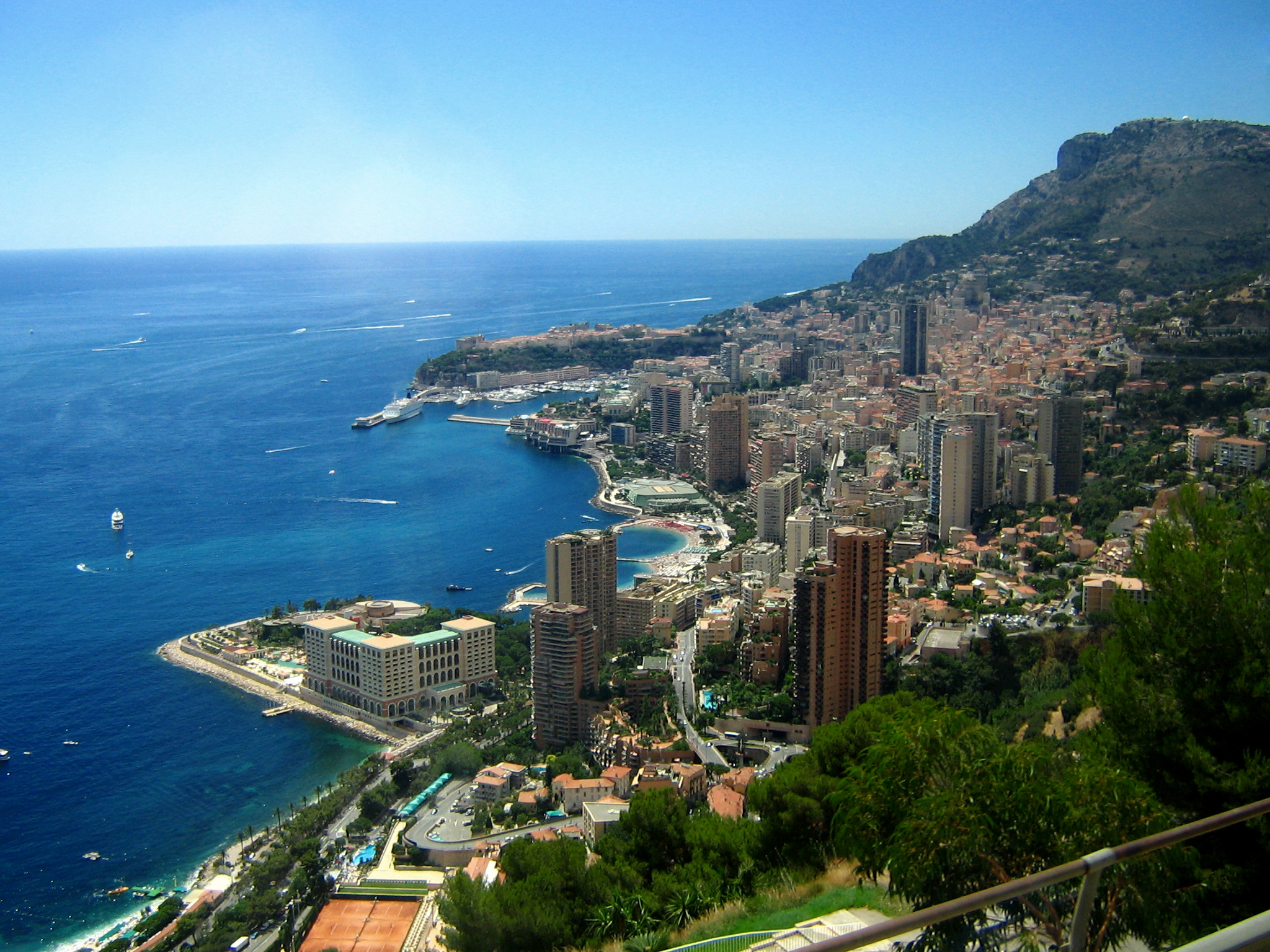
- Football in Monaco
- Founded: 1991
- Region: Monaco
- Number of teams: List of clubs
- Current champions: Fonction Publique (1st) (2006)
- Most successful club(s): Lancaster (2 titles)
- 2012 Challenge Monégasque

The Challenge Monégasque football cup is a football tournament for amateur football teams from Monaco, beginning in 1991.

In recent years, the tournament has been seen as a third level competition in the country, below the Challenge Prince Rainier III and the Trophée Ville de Monaco.

== Records ==
A list of clubs that have made it to at least 1 Challenge Monégasque final, reflecting their success in finals. (Up to and including the 2006 season).

Club	Finals	Won	Lost
Lancaster	2	2	-
Sapeurs-Pompiers	2	1	1
SUC	1	1	-
Café de Paris	1	1	-
Monte Carlo Country football Club	1	1	-
Sofamo Biotherm	1	1	-
Fonction Publique	1	1	-
Monaco Parkings	1	1	-
Carabieners du Prince	1	1	-
SBM Administration	1	-	1
HBS	1	-	1
Radio Monte Carlo	1	-	1
SDAU	1	-	1
Slot Sun Casiono	1	-	1
HSBC Republic Bank	1	-	1
Carrefour Monaco	1	-	1
Pompiers MC	1	-	1
Pompiers Monaco	1	-	1

== List of Winners ==
Scores in brackets are penalty shoot-out results.

Year	Winners	Score	Runners-up
1991	Sapeurs-Pompiers	2-0	SBM Administration
1992	Lancaster	3-1	Sapeurs-Pompiers
1993	Lancaster	0-0 (?-?)	HBS
1994	SUC	5-5 (?-?)	Radio Monte Carlo
1991-1995: No tournament held
2000	Café de Paris	5-0	SDAU
2001	Monte Carlo Country Club	3-1	Slot Sun Casiono
2002-2004: No tournament held
2005	Sofamo Biotherm	5-3	HSBC Republic Bank
2006	Fonction Publique	2-0	Carrefour Monaco
2007-2014: No tournament held
2015	Monaco Parkings	2-0	Pompiers MC
2016	Carabieners du Prince	1-0	Pompiers Monaco
2017-2022: No tournament held

== See also ==
- Challenge Prince Rainier III
- Trophée Ville de Monaco
- Football in Monaco
- List of football clubs in Monaco
