= UEFA Euro 2024 squads =

Squad lists of UEFA Euro 2024 national teams

UEFA Euro 2024 was an international football tournament held in Germany that took place from 14 June to 14 July 2024. The 24 national teams involved in the tournament were required to register a squad of 23 to 26 players – of which three had to be goalkeepers – by 7 June 2024, 23:59 CEST (UTC+2), seven days prior to the opening match of the tournament. Only players in these squads were eligible to take part in the tournament. IInitially, regulations required teams to consist of 23 players, but this was amended by UEFA Executive Committee on 3 May 2024.

In the event that a player on the submitted squad list suffered from an injury or illness prior to his team's first match of the tournament, that player could be replaced, provided that the team doctor and a doctor from the UEFA Medical Committee both confirmed that the injury or illness was severe enough to prevent the player from participating in the tournament. If a goalkeeper had suffered from an injury or illness after his team's first tournament match, he could still be replaced, even if the other goalkeepers from the squad were still available. A player who had been replaced on the player list could not be readmitted to the list.

The position listed for each player is per the official squad lists published by UEFA. The age listed for each player is their age as of 14 June 2024, the first day of the tournament. The numbers of caps and goals listed for them do not include any matches played after the start of the tournament. The club listed is the club for which the player last played a competitive match prior to the tournament. The nationality for each club reflects the national association (not the league) to which the club is affiliated. A flag is included for coaches who are of a different nationality to their team.

== Group A ==
=== Germany ===
Manager: Julian Nagelsmann

Germany started the announcement of their players on 12 May 2024, beginning with the call-up of Nico Schlotterbeck. On 16 May, 27 players were called up to the preliminary squad. On 7 June, the final squad was announced, with the exclusion of goalkeeper Alexander Nübel. On 12 June, it was announced that Aleksandar Pavlović would miss the Euros due to illness. Emre Can was announced as his replacement.

No.	Pos.	Player	Date of birth (age)	Caps	Goals	Club
1	GK	Manuel Neuer	27 March 1986 (aged 38)	119	0	(German Football Association) Bayern Munich
2	DF	Antonio Rüdiger	3 March 1993 (aged 31)	69	3	(Royal Spanish Football Federation) Real Madrid
3	DF	David Raum	22 April 1998 (aged 26)	21	0	(German Football Association) RB Leipzig
4	DF	Jonathan Tah	11 February 1996 (aged 28)	25	0	(German Football Association) Bayer Leverkusen
5	MF	Pascal Groß	15 June 1991 (aged 32)	7	1	(The Football Association) Brighton & Hove Albion
6	DF	Joshua Kimmich	8 February 1995 (aged 29)	86	6	(German Football Association) Bayern Munich
7	FW	Kai Havertz	11 June 1999 (aged 25)	46	16	(The Football Association) Arsenal
8	MF	Toni Kroos	4 January 1990 (aged 34)	109	17	(Royal Spanish Football Federation) Real Madrid
9	FW	Niclas Füllkrug	9 February 1993 (aged 31)	16	11	(German Football Association) Borussia Dortmund
10	MF	Jamal Musiala	26 February 2003 (aged 21)	29	2	(German Football Association) Bayern Munich
11	MF	Chris Führich	9 January 1998 (aged 26)	4	0	(German Football Association) VfB Stuttgart
12	GK	Oliver Baumann	2 June 1990 (aged 34)	0	0	(German Football Association) TSG Hoffenheim
13	FW	Thomas Müller	13 September 1989 (aged 34)	129	45	(German Football Association) Bayern Munich
14	FW	Maximilian Beier	17 October 2002 (aged 21)	1	0	(German Football Association) TSG Hoffenheim
15	DF	Nico Schlotterbeck	1 December 1999 (aged 24)	12	0	(German Football Association) Borussia Dortmund
16	DF	Waldemar Anton	20 July 1996 (aged 27)	2	0	(German Football Association) VfB Stuttgart
17	MF	Florian Wirtz	3 May 2003 (aged 21)	18	1	(German Football Association) Bayer Leverkusen
18	DF	Maximilian Mittelstädt	18 March 1997 (aged 27)	4	1	(German Football Association) VfB Stuttgart
19	MF	Leroy Sané	11 January 1996 (aged 28)	60	13	(German Football Association) Bayern Munich
20	DF	Benjamin Henrichs	23 February 1997 (aged 27)	15	0	(German Football Association) RB Leipzig
21	MF	İlkay Gündoğan (captain)	24 October 1990 (aged 33)	77	18	(Royal Spanish Football Federation) Barcelona
22	GK	Marc-André ter Stegen	30 April 1992 (aged 32)	40	0	(Royal Spanish Football Federation) Barcelona
23	MF	Robert Andrich	22 September 1994 (aged 29)	5	0	(German Football Association) Bayer Leverkusen
24	DF	Robin Koch	17 July 1996 (aged 27)	9	0	(German Football Association) Eintracht Frankfurt
25	MF	Emre Can	12 January 1994 (aged 30)	43	1	(German Football Association) Borussia Dortmund
26	FW	Deniz Undav	19 July 1996 (aged 27)	2	0	(German Football Association) VfB Stuttgart

=== Scotland ===
Manager: Steve Clarke

On 22 May 2024, 28 players were called up to Scotland's preliminary squad. On 1 June 2024, Lyndon Dykes withdrew due to injury. On 4 June 2024, Ben Gannon-Doak withdrew from the squad and was replaced by Tommy Conway. On 6 June 2024, Lewis Morgan was added to the squad. On 7 June 2024, the final squad was announced, with Craig Gordon and John Souttar missing out.

No.	Pos.	Player	Date of birth (age)	Caps	Goals	Club
1	GK	Angus Gunn	22 January 1996 (aged 28)	10	0	(The Football Association) Norwich City
2	DF	Anthony Ralston	16 November 1998 (aged 25)	9	1	(Scottish Football Association) Celtic
3	DF	Andy Robertson (captain)	11 March 1994 (aged 30)	71	3	(The Football Association) Liverpool
4	MF	Scott McTominay	8 December 1996 (aged 27)	49	8	(The Football Association) Manchester United
5	DF	Grant Hanley	20 November 1991 (aged 32)	50	2	(The Football Association) Norwich City
6	DF	Kieran Tierney	5 June 1997 (aged 27)	45	1	(Royal Spanish Football Federation) Real Sociedad
7	MF	John McGinn	18 October 1994 (aged 29)	66	18	(The Football Association) Aston Villa
8	MF	Callum McGregor	14 June 1993 (aged 31)	60	3	(Scottish Football Association) Celtic
9	FW	Lawrence Shankland	10 August 1995 (aged 28)	11	3	(Scottish Football Association) Heart of Midlothian
10	FW	Ché Adams	13 July 1996 (aged 27)	30	6	(The Football Association) Southampton
11	FW	Ryan Christie	22 February 1995 (aged 29)	49	6	(The Football Association) Bournemouth
12	GK	Liam Kelly	23 January 1996 (aged 28)	1	0	(Scottish Football Association) Motherwell
13	DF	Jack Hendry	7 May 1995 (aged 29)	31	3	(Saudi Arabian Football Federation) Al-Ettifaq
14	MF	Billy Gilmour	11 June 2001 (aged 23)	27	1	(The Football Association) Brighton & Hove Albion
15	DF	Ryan Porteous	25 March 1999 (aged 25)	11	1	(The Football Association) Watford
16	DF	Liam Cooper	30 August 1991 (aged 32)	19	0	(The Football Association) Leeds United
17	MF	Stuart Armstrong	30 March 1992 (aged 32)	50	5	(The Football Association) Southampton
18	MF	Lewis Morgan	30 September 1996 (aged 27)	3	0	(United States Soccer Federation) New York Red Bulls
19	FW	Tommy Conway	6 August 2002 (aged 21)	1	0	(The Football Association) Bristol City
20	MF	Ryan Jack	27 February 1992 (aged 32)	20	0	(Scottish Football Association) Rangers
21	GK	Zander Clark	26 June 1992 (aged 31)	4	0	(Scottish Football Association) Heart of Midlothian
22	DF	Ross McCrorie	18 March 1998 (aged 26)	1	0	(The Football Association) Bristol City
23	MF	Kenny McLean	8 January 1992 (aged 32)	39	2	(The Football Association) Norwich City
24	DF	Greg Taylor	5 November 1997 (aged 26)	14	0	(Scottish Football Association) Celtic
25	MF	James Forrest	7 July 1991 (aged 32)	39	5	(Scottish Football Association) Celtic
26	DF	Scott McKenna	12 November 1996 (aged 27)	35	1	(Danish Football Association) Copenhagen

=== Hungary ===
Manager: (Italy) Marco Rossi

Hungary announced their final 26-man squad on 14 May 2024. In case of injury or withdrawal, Rossi declared five players: Krisztián Lisztes, Attila Mocsi, Balázs Tóth, Zalán Vancsa and Bálint Vécsei.

No.	Pos.	Player	Date of birth (age)	Caps	Goals	Club
1	GK	Péter Gulácsi	6 May 1990 (aged 34)	54	0	(German Football Association) RB Leipzig
2	DF	Ádám Lang	17 January 1993 (aged 31)	69	2	(Cyprus Football Association) Omonia
3	DF	Botond Balogh	6 June 2002 (aged 22)	4	0	(Italian Football Federation) Parma
4	DF	Attila Szalai	20 January 1998 (aged 26)	44	1	(German Football Association) SC Freiburg
5	DF	Attila Fiola	17 February 1990 (aged 34)	57	2	(Hungarian Football Federation) Fehérvár
6	DF	Willi Orbán	3 November 1992 (aged 31)	45	6	(German Football Association) RB Leipzig
7	DF	Loïc Négo	15 January 1991 (aged 33)	36	2	(French Football Federation) Le Havre
8	MF	Ádám Nagy	17 June 1995 (aged 28)	81	2	(Italian Football Federation) Spezia
9	FW	Martin Ádám	6 November 1994 (aged 29)	22	3	(Korea Football Association) Ulsan HD
10	MF	Dominik Szoboszlai (captain)	25 October 2000 (aged 23)	42	12	(The Football Association) Liverpool
11	DF	Milos Kerkez	7 November 2003 (aged 20)	16	0	(The Football Association) Bournemouth
12	GK	Dénes Dibusz	16 November 1990 (aged 33)	36	0	(Hungarian Football Federation) Ferencváros
13	MF	András Schäfer	13 April 1999 (aged 25)	25	3	(German Football Association) Union Berlin
14	DF	Bendegúz Bolla	22 November 1999 (aged 24)	17	0	(Swiss Football Association) Servette
15	MF	László Kleinheisler	8 April 1994 (aged 30)	51	3	(Croatian Football Federation) Hajduk Split
16	MF	Dániel Gazdag	2 March 1996 (aged 28)	25	4	(United States Soccer Federation) Philadelphia Union
17	MF	Callum Styles	28 March 2000 (aged 24)	22	0	(The Football Association) Sunderland
18	DF	Zsolt Nagy	25 May 1993 (aged 31)	20	3	(Hungarian Football Federation) Puskás Akadémia
19	FW	Barnabás Varga	25 October 1994 (aged 29)	11	6	(Hungarian Football Federation) Ferencváros
20	FW	Roland Sallai	22 May 1997 (aged 27)	49	13	(German Football Association) SC Freiburg
21	DF	Endre Botka	25 August 1994 (aged 29)	26	1	(Hungarian Football Federation) Ferencváros
22	GK	Péter Szappanos	14 November 1990 (aged 33)	1	0	(Hungarian Football Federation) Paks
23	FW	Kevin Csoboth	20 June 2000 (aged 23)	8	0	(Hungarian Football Federation) Újpest
24	DF	Márton Dárdai	12 February 2002 (aged 22)	3	0	(German Football Association) Hertha BSC
25	FW	Krisztofer Horváth	8 January 2002 (aged 22)	2	0	(Hungarian Football Federation) Kecskemét
26	MF	Mihály Kata	13 April 2002 (aged 22)	3	0	(Hungarian Football Federation) MTK Budapest

=== Switzerland ===
Manager: Murat Yakin

Switzerland announced a 38-man preliminary squad on 17 May 2024. On 29 May, Yakin declared that Aurèle Amenda, Ulisses Garcia, Joël Monteiro, Bryan Okoh and Bećir Omeragić would not be included in the final selection, reducing the squad down to 33 players. On 5 June, the Swiss Football Association announced that six more players would not be part of the final squad: Kevin Mbabu, Filip Ugrinić, Albian Hajdari, Uran Bislimi and the goalkeepers Pascal Loretz and Marvin Keller. The last player to be cut was Andi Zeqiri on 7 June.

No.	Pos.	Player	Date of birth (age)	Caps	Goals	Club
1	GK	Yann Sommer	17 December 1988 (aged 35)	89	0	(Italian Football Federation) Inter Milan
2	DF	Leonidas Stergiou	3 March 2002 (aged 22)	3	0	(German Football Association) VfB Stuttgart
3	DF	Silvan Widmer	5 March 1993 (aged 31)	43	4	(German Football Association) Mainz 05
4	DF	Nico Elvedi	30 September 1996 (aged 27)	53	2	(German Football Association) Borussia Mönchengladbach
5	DF	Manuel Akanji	19 July 1995 (aged 28)	60	3	(The Football Association) Manchester City
6	MF	Denis Zakaria	20 November 1996 (aged 27)	54	3	(French Football Federation) Monaco (Note: Monaco is a Monégasque club playing in the French football league system.)
7	FW	Breel Embolo	14 February 1997 (aged 27)	63	13	(French Football Federation) Monaco
8	MF	Remo Freuler	15 April 1992 (aged 32)	67	9	(Italian Football Federation) Bologna
9	FW	Noah Okafor	24 May 2000 (aged 24)	22	2	(Italian Football Federation) Milan
10	MF	Granit Xhaka (captain)	27 September 1992 (aged 31)	125	14	(German Football Association) Bayer Leverkusen
11	MF	Renato Steffen	3 November 1991 (aged 32)	39	4	(Swiss Football Association) Lugano
12	GK	Yvon Mvogo	6 June 1994 (aged 30)	9	0	(French Football Federation) Lorient
13	DF	Ricardo Rodriguez	25 August 1992 (aged 31)	115	9	(Italian Football Federation) Torino
14	MF	Steven Zuber	17 August 1991 (aged 32)	54	11	(Hellenic Football Federation) AEK Athens
15	DF	Cédric Zesiger	24 June 1998 (aged 25)	4	0	(German Football Association) VfL Wolfsburg
16	MF	Vincent Sierro	8 October 1995 (aged 28)	3	0	(French Football Federation) Toulouse
17	MF	Rubén Vargas	5 August 1998 (aged 25)	43	7	(German Football Association) FC Augsburg
18	FW	Kwadwo Duah	24 February 1997 (aged 27)	1	0	(Bulgarian Football Union) Ludogorets Razgrad
19	FW	Dan Ndoye	25 October 2000 (aged 23)	11	0	(Italian Football Federation) Bologna
20	MF	Michel Aebischer	6 January 1997 (aged 27)	20	0	(Italian Football Federation) Bologna
21	GK	Gregor Kobel	6 December 1997 (aged 26)	5	0	(German Football Association) Borussia Dortmund
22	DF	Fabian Schär	20 December 1991 (aged 32)	81	8	(The Football Association) Newcastle United
23	MF	Xherdan Shaqiri	10 October 1991 (aged 32)	123	31	(United States Soccer Federation) Chicago Fire
24	MF	Ardon Jashari	30 July 2002 (aged 21)	2	0	(Swiss Football Association) Luzern
25	FW	Zeki Amdouni	4 December 2000 (aged 23)	15	7	(The Football Association) Burnley
26	MF	Fabian Rieder	16 February 2002 (aged 22)	5	0	(French Football Federation) Rennes

== Group B ==
=== Spain ===
Manager: Luis de la Fuente

Spain announced a 29-man preliminary squad on 27 May 2024. On 7 June 2024, the final squad was confirmed, with Pau Cubarsí, Aleix García and Marcos Llorente missing out.

No.	Pos.	Player	Date of birth (age)	Caps	Goals	Club
1	GK	David Raya	15 September 1995 (aged 28)	5	0	(The Football Association) Arsenal
2	DF	Dani Carvajal	11 January 1992 (aged 32)	44	0	(Royal Spanish Football Federation) Real Madrid
3	DF	Robin Le Normand	11 November 1996 (aged 27)	11	1	(Royal Spanish Football Federation) Real Sociedad
4	DF	Nacho	18 January 1990 (aged 34)	25	1	(Royal Spanish Football Federation) Real Madrid
5	DF	Daniel Vivian	5 July 1999 (aged 24)	2	0	(Royal Spanish Football Federation) Athletic Bilbao
6	MF	Mikel Merino	22 June 1996 (aged 27)	21	1	(Royal Spanish Football Federation) Real Sociedad
7	FW	Álvaro Morata (captain)	23 October 1992 (aged 31)	73	35	(Royal Spanish Football Federation) Atlético Madrid
8	MF	Fabián Ruiz	3 April 1996 (aged 28)	23	2	(French Football Federation) Paris Saint-Germain
9	FW	Joselu	27 March 1990 (aged 34)	11	5	(Royal Spanish Football Federation) Real Madrid
10	FW	Dani Olmo	7 May 1998 (aged 26)	33	8	(German Football Association) RB Leipzig
11	FW	Ferran Torres	29 February 2000 (aged 24)	41	19	(Royal Spanish Football Federation) Barcelona
12	DF	Álex Grimaldo	20 September 1995 (aged 28)	4	0	(German Football Association) Bayer Leverkusen
13	GK	Álex Remiro	24 March 1995 (aged 29)	1	0	(Royal Spanish Football Federation) Real Sociedad
14	DF	Aymeric Laporte	27 May 1994 (aged 30)	29	1	(Saudi Arabian Football Federation) Al Nassr
15	MF	Álex Baena	20 July 2001 (aged 22)	3	1	(Royal Spanish Football Federation) Villarreal
16	MF	Rodri	22 June 1996 (aged 27)	50	3	(The Football Association) Manchester City
17	FW	Nico Williams	12 July 2002 (aged 21)	14	2	(Royal Spanish Football Federation) Athletic Bilbao
18	MF	Martín Zubimendi	2 February 1999 (aged 25)	6	0	(Royal Spanish Football Federation) Real Sociedad
19	FW	Lamine Yamal	13 July 2007 (aged 16)	7	2	(Royal Spanish Football Federation) Barcelona
20	MF	Pedri	25 November 2002 (aged 21)	20	2	(Royal Spanish Football Federation) Barcelona
21	FW	Mikel Oyarzabal	21 April 1997 (aged 27)	30	11	(Royal Spanish Football Federation) Real Sociedad
22	DF	Jesús Navas	21 November 1985 (aged 38)	53	5	(Royal Spanish Football Federation) Sevilla
23	GK	Unai Simón	11 June 1997 (aged 27)	40	0	(Royal Spanish Football Federation) Athletic Bilbao
24	DF	Marc Cucurella	22 July 1998 (aged 25)	4	0	(The Football Association) Chelsea
25	MF	Fermín López	11 May 2003 (aged 21)	1	0	(Royal Spanish Football Federation) Barcelona
26	FW	Ayoze Pérez	29 July 1993 (aged 30)	1	1	(Royal Spanish Football Federation) Real Betis

=== Croatia ===
Manager: Zlatko Dalić

Croatia announced their preliminary 35-man squad on 20 May 2024. The final 26-man squad was announced on 7 June 2024.

No.	Pos.	Player	Date of birth (age)	Caps	Goals	Club
1	GK	Dominik Livaković	9 January 1995 (aged 29)	54	0	(Turkish Football Federation) Fenerbahçe
2	DF	Josip Stanišić	2 April 2000 (aged 24)	18	0	(German Football Association) Bayer Leverkusen
3	DF	Marin Pongračić	11 September 1997 (aged 26)	8	0	(Italian Football Federation) Lecce
4	DF	Joško Gvardiol	23 January 2002 (aged 22)	30	2	(The Football Association) Manchester City
5	DF	Martin Erlić	24 January 1998 (aged 26)	9	0	(Italian Football Federation) Sassuolo
6	DF	Josip Šutalo	28 February 2000 (aged 24)	14	0	(Royal Dutch Football Association) Ajax
7	MF	Lovro Majer	17 January 1998 (aged 26)	31	8	(German Football Association) VfL Wolfsburg
8	MF	Mateo Kovačić	6 May 1994 (aged 30)	101	5	(The Football Association) Manchester City
9	FW	Andrej Kramarić	19 June 1991 (aged 32)	93	28	(German Football Association) TSG Hoffenheim
10	MF	Luka Modrić (captain)	9 September 1985 (aged 38)	175	25	(Royal Spanish Football Federation) Real Madrid
11	MF	Marcelo Brozović	16 November 1992 (aged 31)	96	7	(Saudi Arabian Football Federation) Al Nassr
12	GK	Nediljko Labrović	10 October 1999 (aged 24)	1	0	(Croatian Football Federation) Rijeka
13	MF	Nikola Vlašić	4 October 1997 (aged 26)	56	8	(Italian Football Federation) Torino
14	FW	Ivan Perišić	2 February 1989 (aged 35)	131	33	(Croatian Football Federation) Hajduk Split
15	MF	Mario Pašalić	9 February 1995 (aged 29)	63	10	(Italian Football Federation) Atalanta
16	FW	Ante Budimir	22 July 1991 (aged 32)	21	3	(Royal Spanish Football Federation) Osasuna
17	FW	Bruno Petković	16 September 1994 (aged 29)	38	11	(Croatian Football Federation) Dinamo Zagreb
18	FW	Luka Ivanušec	26 November 1998 (aged 25)	21	2	(Royal Dutch Football Association) Feyenoord
19	DF	Borna Sosa	21 January 1998 (aged 26)	20	1	(Royal Dutch Football Association) Ajax
20	FW	Marko Pjaca	6 May 1995 (aged 29)	26	1	(Croatian Football Federation) Rijeka
21	DF	Domagoj Vida	29 April 1989 (aged 35)	105	4	(Hellenic Football Federation) AEK Athens
22	DF	Josip Juranović	16 August 1995 (aged 28)	37	0	(German Football Association) Union Berlin
23	GK	Ivica Ivušić	1 February 1995 (aged 29)	6	0	(Cyprus Football Association) Pafos
24	FW	Marco Pašalić	14 September 2000 (aged 23)	5	1	(Croatian Football Federation) Rijeka
25	MF	Luka Sučić	8 September 2002 (aged 21)	7	0	(Austrian Football Association) Red Bull Salzburg
26	MF	Martin Baturina	16 February 2003 (aged 21)	3	0	(Croatian Football Federation) Dinamo Zagreb

=== Italy ===
Manager: Luciano Spalletti

Italy announced a 30-man squad on 23 May 2024. On 30 May, Francesco Acerbi was forced to withdraw due to injury. On 2 June, Giorgio Scalvini was also forced to withdraw due to injury, and the next day Federico Gatti was called up as a replacement. On 6 June, the final 26-man squad was announced, with Ivan Provedel, Samuele Ricci and Riccardo Orsolini being cut.

No.	Pos.	Player	Date of birth (age)	Caps	Goals	Club
1	GK	Gianluigi Donnarumma (captain)	25 February 1999 (aged 25)	62	0	(French Football Federation) Paris Saint-Germain
2	DF	Giovanni Di Lorenzo	4 August 1993 (aged 30)	35	3	(Italian Football Federation) Napoli
3	DF	Federico Dimarco	10 November 1997 (aged 26)	19	2	(Italian Football Federation) Inter Milan
4	DF	Alessandro Buongiorno	6 June 1999 (aged 25)	4	0	(Italian Football Federation) Torino
5	DF	Riccardo Calafiori	19 May 2002 (aged 22)	2	0	(Italian Football Federation) Bologna
6	DF	Federico Gatti	24 June 1998 (aged 25)	3	0	(Italian Football Federation) Juventus
7	MF	Davide Frattesi	22 September 1999 (aged 24)	15	5	(Italian Football Federation) Inter Milan
8	MF	Jorginho	20 December 1991 (aged 32)	54	5	(The Football Association) Arsenal
9	FW	Gianluca Scamacca	1 January 1999 (aged 25)	16	1	(Italian Football Federation) Atalanta
10	MF	Lorenzo Pellegrini	19 June 1996 (aged 27)	30	6	(Italian Football Federation) Roma
11	FW	Giacomo Raspadori	18 February 2000 (aged 24)	28	6	(Italian Football Federation) Napoli
12	GK	Guglielmo Vicario	7 October 1996 (aged 27)	2	0	(The Football Association) Tottenham Hotspur
13	DF	Matteo Darmian	2 December 1989 (aged 34)	43	2	(Italian Football Federation) Inter Milan
14	FW	Federico Chiesa	25 October 1997 (aged 26)	47	7	(Italian Football Federation) Juventus
15	DF	Raoul Bellanova	17 May 2000 (aged 24)	2	0	(Italian Football Federation) Torino
16	MF	Bryan Cristante	3 March 1995 (aged 29)	40	2	(Italian Football Federation) Roma
17	DF	Gianluca Mancini	17 April 1996 (aged 28)	13	0	(Italian Football Federation) Roma
18	MF	Nicolò Barella	7 February 1997 (aged 27)	53	9	(Italian Football Federation) Inter Milan
19	FW	Mateo Retegui	29 April 1999 (aged 25)	8	4	(Italian Football Federation) Genoa
20	FW	Mattia Zaccagni	16 June 1995 (aged 28)	5	0	(Italian Football Federation) Lazio
21	MF	Nicolò Fagioli	12 February 2001 (aged 23)	3	0	(Italian Football Federation) Juventus
22	FW	Stephan El Shaarawy	27 October 1992 (aged 31)	31	7	(Italian Football Federation) Roma
23	DF	Alessandro Bastoni	13 April 1999 (aged 25)	23	1	(Italian Football Federation) Inter Milan
24	DF	Andrea Cambiaso	20 February 2000 (aged 24)	4	0	(Italian Football Federation) Juventus
25	FW	Michael Folorunsho	7 February 1998 (aged 26)	1	0	(Italian Football Federation) Hellas Verona
26	GK	Alex Meret	22 March 1997 (aged 27)	3	0	(Italian Football Federation) Napoli

=== Albania ===
Manager: (Brazil) Sylvinho

Albania announced a squad of 27 players on 27 May 2024. The final 26-man squad was officially announced on 8 June, with goalkeeper Simon Simoni being left out.

No.	Pos.	Player	Date of birth (age)	Caps	Goals	Club
1	GK	Etrit Berisha	10 March 1989 (aged 35)	81	0	(Italian Football Federation) Empoli
2	DF	Iván Balliu	1 January 1992 (aged 32)	13	0	(Royal Spanish Football Federation) Rayo Vallecano
3	DF	Mario Mitaj	6 August 2003 (aged 20)	14	0	(Russian Football Union) Lokomotiv Moscow
4	DF	Elseid Hysaj	2 February 1994 (aged 30)	84	2	(Italian Football Federation) Lazio
5	DF	Arlind Ajeti	25 September 1993 (aged 30)	26	1	(Romanian Football Federation) CFR Cluj
6	DF	Berat Djimsiti (captain)	19 February 1993 (aged 31)	58	1	(Italian Football Federation) Atalanta
7	FW	Rey Manaj	24 February 1997 (aged 27)	34	8	(Turkish Football Federation) Sivasspor
8	MF	Klaus Gjasula	14 December 1989 (aged 34)	28	0	(German Football Association) Darmstadt 98
9	FW	Jasir Asani	19 May 1995 (aged 29)	13	4	(Korea Football Association) Gwangju
10	MF	Nedim Bajrami	28 February 1999 (aged 25)	23	4	(Italian Football Federation) Sassuolo
11	FW	Armando Broja	10 September 2001 (aged 22)	21	5	(The Football Association) Fulham
12	GK	Elhan Kastrati	2 February 1997 (aged 27)	2	0	(Italian Football Federation) Cittadella
13	DF	Enea Mihaj	5 July 1998 (aged 25)	19	0	(Portuguese Football Federation) Famalicão
14	MF	Qazim Laçi	19 January 1996 (aged 28)	27	3	(Football Association of the Czech Republic) Sparta Prague
15	FW	Taulant Seferi	15 November 1996 (aged 27)	19	3	(United Arab Emirates Football Association) Baniyas
16	MF	Medon Berisha	21 October 2003 (aged 20)	1	0	(Italian Football Federation) Lecce
17	FW	Ernest Muçi	19 March 2001 (aged 23)	10	3	(Turkish Football Federation) Beşiktaş
18	DF	Ardian Ismajli	30 September 1996 (aged 27)	38	2	(Italian Football Federation) Empoli
19	FW	Mirlind Daku	1 January 1998 (aged 26)	5	1	(Russian Football Union) Rubin Kazan
20	MF	Ylber Ramadani	12 April 1996 (aged 28)	35	1	(Italian Football Federation) Lecce
21	MF	Kristjan Asllani	9 March 2002 (aged 22)	20	2	(Italian Football Federation) Inter Milan
22	MF	Amir Abrashi	27 March 1990 (aged 34)	50	1	(Swiss Football Association) Grasshoppers
23	GK	Thomas Strakosha	19 March 1995 (aged 29)	28	0	(The Football Association) Brentford
24	DF	Marash Kumbulla	8 February 2000 (aged 24)	19	0	(Italian Football Federation) Sassuolo
25	DF	Naser Aliji	27 December 1993 (aged 30)	14	0	(Romanian Football Federation) Voluntari
26	FW	Arbër Hoxha	6 October 1998 (aged 25)	4	0	(Croatian Football Federation) Dinamo Zagreb

== Group C ==
=== Slovenia ===
Manager: Matjaž Kek

On 21 May 2024, 30 players were announced as Slovenia's wider team list for the tournament. On 7 June 2024, the 26-man squad was announced, with Matevž Vidovšek, Žan Zaletel, Luka Zahović and Miha Zajc being cut.

No.	Pos.	Player	Date of birth (age)	Caps	Goals	Club
1	GK	Jan Oblak (captain)	7 January 1993 (aged 31)	65	0	(Royal Spanish Football Federation) Atlético Madrid
2	DF	Žan Karničnik	18 September 1994 (aged 29)	28	1	(Football Association of Slovenia) Celje
3	DF	Jure Balkovec	9 September 1994 (aged 29)	33	0	(Turkish Football Federation) Alanyaspor
4	DF	Miha Blažič	8 May 1993 (aged 31)	32	0	(Polish Football Association) Lech Poznań
5	DF	Jon Gorenc Stanković	14 January 1996 (aged 28)	24	1	(Austrian Football Association) Sturm Graz
6	DF	Jaka Bijol	5 February 1999 (aged 25)	49	1	(Italian Football Federation) Udinese
7	MF	Benjamin Verbič	27 November 1993 (aged 30)	58	6	(Hellenic Football Federation) Panathinaikos
8	MF	Sandi Lovrić	28 March 1998 (aged 26)	35	4	(Italian Football Federation) Udinese
9	FW	Andraž Šporar	27 February 1994 (aged 30)	53	12	(Hellenic Football Federation) Panathinaikos
10	MF	Timi Max Elšnik	29 April 1998 (aged 26)	15	1	(Football Association of Slovenia) Olimpija Ljubljana
11	FW	Benjamin Šeško	31 May 2003 (aged 21)	29	11	(German Football Association) RB Leipzig
12	GK	Vid Belec	6 June 1990 (aged 34)	21	0	(Cyprus Football Association) APOEL
13	DF	Erik Janža	21 June 1993 (aged 30)	10	2	(Polish Football Association) Górnik Zabrze
14	MF	Jasmin Kurtić	10 January 1989 (aged 35)	91	2	(Italian Football Federation) Südtirol
15	MF	Tomi Horvat	24 March 1999 (aged 25)	7	0	(Austrian Football Association) Sturm Graz
16	GK	Igor Vekić	6 May 1998 (aged 26)	1	0	(Danish Football Association) Vejle
17	FW	Jan Mlakar	23 October 1998 (aged 25)	17	3	(Italian Football Federation) Pisa
18	FW	Žan Vipotnik	18 March 2002 (aged 22)	9	2	(French Football Federation) Bordeaux
19	FW	Žan Celar	14 March 1999 (aged 25)	10	0	(Swiss Football Association) Lugano
20	DF	Petar Stojanović	7 October 1995 (aged 28)	53	2	(Italian Football Federation) Sampdoria
21	DF	Vanja Drkušić	30 October 1999 (aged 24)	7	0	(Russian Football Union) Sochi
22	MF	Adam Gnezda Čerin	16 July 1999 (aged 24)	31	4	(Hellenic Football Federation) Panathinaikos
23	DF	David Brekalo	3 December 1998 (aged 25)	13	1	(United States Soccer Federation) Orlando City
24	MF	Nino Žugelj	23 May 2000 (aged 24)	1	0	(Norwegian Football Federation) Bodø/Glimt
25	MF	Adrian Zeljković	19 August 2002 (aged 21)	1	0	(Slovak Football Association) Spartak Trnava
26	MF	Josip Iličić	29 January 1988 (aged 36)	81	17	(Football Association of Slovenia) Maribor

=== Denmark ===
Manager: Kasper Hjulmand

Denmark announced their final squad on 30 May 2024.

No.	Pos.	Player	Date of birth (age)	Caps	Goals	Club
1	GK	Kasper Schmeichel	5 November 1986 (aged 37)	101	0	(Royal Belgian Football Association) Anderlecht
2	DF	Joachim Andersen	31 May 1996 (aged 28)	32	0	(The Football Association) Crystal Palace
3	DF	Jannik Vestergaard	3 August 1992 (aged 31)	41	3	(The Football Association) Leicester City
4	DF	Simon Kjær (captain)	26 March 1989 (aged 35)	132	5	(Italian Football Federation) Milan
5	DF	Joakim Mæhle	20 May 1997 (aged 27)	45	11	(German Football Association) VfL Wolfsburg
6	DF	Andreas Christensen	10 April 1996 (aged 28)	69	3	(Royal Spanish Football Federation) Barcelona
7	MF	Mathias Jensen	1 January 1996 (aged 28)	30	1	(The Football Association) Brentford
8	MF	Thomas Delaney	3 September 1991 (aged 32)	78	8	(Royal Belgian Football Association) Anderlecht
9	FW	Rasmus Højlund	4 February 2003 (aged 21)	14	7	(The Football Association) Manchester United
10	MF	Christian Eriksen	14 February 1992 (aged 32)	130	41	(The Football Association) Manchester United
11	FW	Andreas Skov Olsen	29 December 1999 (aged 24)	30	8	(Royal Belgian Football Association) Club Brugge
12	FW	Kasper Dolberg	6 October 1997 (aged 26)	47	11	(Royal Belgian Football Association) Anderlecht
13	DF	Mathias Jørgensen	23 April 1990 (aged 34)	37	2	(The Football Association) Brentford
14	FW	Mikkel Damsgaard	3 July 2000 (aged 23)	27	4	(The Football Association) Brentford
15	MF	Christian Nørgaard	10 March 1994 (aged 30)	25	1	(The Football Association) Brentford
16	GK	Mads Hermansen	11 July 2000 (aged 23)	0	0	(The Football Association) Leicester City
17	DF	Victor Kristiansen	16 December 2002 (aged 21)	8	0	(Italian Football Federation) Bologna
18	DF	Alexander Bah	9 December 1997 (aged 26)	11	1	(Portuguese Football Federation) Benfica
19	FW	Jonas Wind	7 February 1999 (aged 25)	27	8	(German Football Association) VfL Wolfsburg
20	FW	Yussuf Poulsen	15 June 1994 (aged 29)	79	13	(German Football Association) RB Leipzig
21	MF	Morten Hjulmand	25 June 1999 (aged 24)	7	0	(Portuguese Football Federation) Sporting CP
22	GK	Frederik Rønnow	4 August 1992 (aged 31)	10	0	(German Football Association) Union Berlin
23	MF	Pierre-Emile Højbjerg	5 August 1995 (aged 28)	77	10	(The Football Association) Tottenham Hotspur
24	MF	Anders Dreyer	2 May 1998 (aged 26)	3	0	(Royal Belgian Football Association) Anderlecht
25	DF	Rasmus Kristensen	11 July 1997 (aged 26)	21	0	(Italian Football Federation) Roma
26	MF	Jacob Bruun Larsen	19 September 1998 (aged 25)	6	1	(The Football Association) Burnley

=== Serbia ===
Manager: Dragan Stojković

Serbia announced a 35-man preliminary squad on 18 May 2024. The final squad of 26 players was confirmed on 27 May.

No.	Pos.	Player	Date of birth (age)	Caps	Goals	Club
1	GK	Predrag Rajković	31 October 1995 (aged 28)	32	0	(Royal Spanish Football Federation) Mallorca
2	DF	Strahinja Pavlović	24 May 2001 (aged 23)	35	4	(Austrian Football Association) Red Bull Salzburg
3	DF	Nemanja Stojić	15 January 1998 (aged 26)	2	0	(Football Association of Serbia) TSC
4	DF	Nikola Milenković	12 October 1997 (aged 26)	53	3	(Italian Football Federation) Fiorentina
5	MF	Nemanja Maksimović	26 January 1995 (aged 29)	49	0	(Royal Spanish Football Federation) Getafe
6	MF	Nemanja Gudelj	16 November 1991 (aged 32)	62	1	(Royal Spanish Football Federation) Sevilla
7	FW	Dušan Vlahović	28 January 2000 (aged 24)	27	13	(Italian Football Federation) Juventus
8	FW	Luka Jović	23 December 1997 (aged 26)	35	10	(Italian Football Federation) Milan
9	FW	Aleksandar Mitrović	16 September 1994 (aged 29)	91	58	(Saudi Arabian Football Federation) Al Hilal
10	MF	Dušan Tadić (captain)	20 November 1988 (aged 35)	108	23	(Turkish Football Federation) Fenerbahçe
11	MF	Filip Kostić	1 November 1992 (aged 31)	63	3	(Italian Football Federation) Juventus
12	GK	Đorđe Petrović	8 October 1999 (aged 24)	3	0	(The Football Association) Chelsea
13	DF	Miloš Veljković	26 September 1995 (aged 28)	30	1	(German Football Association) Werder Bremen
14	MF	Andrija Živković	11 July 1996 (aged 27)	46	1	(Hellenic Football Federation) PAOK
15	DF	Srđan Babić	22 April 1996 (aged 28)	8	1	(Russian Football Union) Spartak Moscow
16	MF	Srđan Mijailović	10 November 1993 (aged 30)	7	0	(Football Association of Serbia) Red Star Belgrade
17	MF	Ivan Ilić	17 March 2001 (aged 23)	16	0	(Italian Football Federation) Torino
18	FW	Petar Ratkov	18 August 2003 (aged 20)	1	0	(Austrian Football Association) Red Bull Salzburg
19	MF	Lazar Samardžić	24 February 2002 (aged 22)	9	0	(Italian Football Federation) Udinese
20	MF	Sergej Milinković-Savić	27 February 1995 (aged 29)	51	9	(Saudi Arabian Football Federation) Al Hilal
21	MF	Mijat Gaćinović	8 February 1995 (aged 29)	27	2	(Hellenic Football Federation) AEK Athens
22	MF	Saša Lukić	13 August 1996 (aged 27)	46	2	(The Football Association) Fulham
23	GK	Vanja Milinković-Savić	20 February 1997 (aged 27)	19	0	(Italian Football Federation) Torino
24	DF	Uroš Spajić	13 February 1993 (aged 31)	21	0	(Football Association of Serbia) Red Star Belgrade
25	DF	Filip Mladenović	15 August 1991 (aged 32)	31	1	(Hellenic Football Federation) Panathinaikos
26	MF	Veljko Birmančević	5 March 1998 (aged 26)	5	0	(Football Association of the Czech Republic) Sparta Prague

=== England ===
Manager: Gareth Southgate

On 21 May 2024, England called up 33 players to the squad for a preliminary training camp ahead of the tournament. On 6 June 2024, The FA confirmed that James Maddison and Curtis Jones were not part of the final 26-man squad. Later on the same day, the final 26-man squad was announced, with Jarrad Branthwaite, Jack Grealish, Harry Maguire, Jarell Quansah and James Trafford being left out. On 10 June, Tom Heaton was called up to serve as an additional goalkeeper during training sessions, despite not being included in the tournament squad.

No.	Pos.	Player	Date of birth (age)	Caps	Goals	Club
1	GK	Jordan Pickford	7 March 1994 (aged 30)	61	0	(The Football Association) Everton
2	DF	Kyle Walker	28 May 1990 (aged 34)	83	1	(The Football Association) Manchester City
3	DF	Luke Shaw	12 July 1995 (aged 28)	31	3	(The Football Association) Manchester United
4	MF	Declan Rice	14 January 1999 (aged 25)	51	3	(The Football Association) Arsenal
5	DF	John Stones	28 May 1994 (aged 30)	72	3	(The Football Association) Manchester City
6	DF	Marc Guéhi	13 July 2000 (aged 23)	11	0	(The Football Association) Crystal Palace
7	FW	Bukayo Saka	5 September 2001 (aged 22)	33	11	(The Football Association) Arsenal
8	DF	Trent Alexander-Arnold	7 October 1998 (aged 25)	25	3	(The Football Association) Liverpool
9	FW	Harry Kane (captain)	28 July 1993 (aged 30)	91	63	(German Football Association) Bayern Munich
10	MF	Jude Bellingham	29 June 2003 (aged 20)	29	3	(Royal Spanish Football Federation) Real Madrid
11	MF	Phil Foden	28 May 2000 (aged 24)	34	4	(The Football Association) Manchester City
12	DF	Kieran Trippier	19 September 1990 (aged 33)	48	1	(The Football Association) Newcastle United
13	GK	Aaron Ramsdale	14 May 1998 (aged 26)	5	0	(The Football Association) Arsenal
14	DF	Ezri Konsa	23 October 1997 (aged 26)	4	0	(The Football Association) Aston Villa
15	DF	Lewis Dunk	21 November 1991 (aged 32)	6	0	(The Football Association) Brighton & Hove Albion
16	MF	Conor Gallagher	6 February 2000 (aged 24)	13	0	(The Football Association) Chelsea
17	FW	Ivan Toney	16 March 1996 (aged 28)	3	1	(The Football Association) Brentford
18	FW	Anthony Gordon	24 February 2001 (aged 23)	3	0	(The Football Association) Newcastle United
19	FW	Ollie Watkins	30 December 1995 (aged 28)	12	3	(The Football Association) Aston Villa
20	FW	Jarrod Bowen	20 December 1996 (aged 27)	8	0	(The Football Association) West Ham United
21	FW	Eberechi Eze	29 June 1998 (aged 25)	4	0	(The Football Association) Crystal Palace
22	DF	Joe Gomez	23 May 1997 (aged 27)	15	0	(The Football Association) Liverpool
23	GK	Dean Henderson	12 March 1997 (aged 27)	1	0	(The Football Association) Crystal Palace
24	MF	Cole Palmer	6 May 2002 (aged 22)	4	1	(The Football Association) Chelsea
25	MF	Adam Wharton	6 February 2004 (aged 20)	1	0	(The Football Association) Crystal Palace
26	MF	Kobbie Mainoo	19 April 2005 (aged 19)	3	0	(The Football Association) Manchester United

== Group D ==
=== Poland ===
Manager: Michał Probierz

On 29 May 2024, Poland's 29-man preliminary squad was announced. On 2 June, Mateusz Kochalski replaced Oliwier Zych due to injury. On 3 June, Jakub Kałuziński was added to the squad. On 7 June, the final squad was announced, with Mateusz Kochalski, Paweł Bochniewicz, Jakub Kałuziński and Arkadiusz Milik left out.

No.	Pos.	Player	Date of birth (age)	Caps	Goals	Club
1	GK	Wojciech Szczęsny	18 April 1990 (aged 34)	82	0	(Italian Football Federation) Juventus
2	DF	Bartosz Salamon	1 May 1991 (aged 33)	14	0	(Polish Football Association) Lech Poznań
3	MF	Paweł Dawidowicz	20 May 1995 (aged 29)	11	0	(Italian Football Federation) Hellas Verona
4	DF	Sebastian Walukiewicz	5 April 2000 (aged 24)	4	1	(Italian Football Federation) Empoli
5	DF	Jan Bednarek	12 April 1996 (aged 28)	57	1	(The Football Association) Southampton
6	MF	Jakub Piotrowski	4 October 1997 (aged 26)	6	2	(Bulgarian Football Union) Ludogorets Razgrad
7	FW	Karol Świderski	23 January 1997 (aged 27)	31	11	(Italian Football Federation) Hellas Verona
8	MF	Jakub Moder	7 April 1999 (aged 25)	23	2	(The Football Association) Brighton & Hove Albion
9	FW	Robert Lewandowski (captain)	21 August 1988 (aged 35)	150	82	(Royal Spanish Football Federation) Barcelona
10	MF	Piotr Zieliński	20 May 1994 (aged 30)	90	12	(Italian Football Federation) Napoli
11	MF	Kamil Grosicki	8 June 1988 (aged 36)	93	17	(Polish Football Association) Pogoń Szczecin
12	GK	Łukasz Skorupski	5 May 1991 (aged 33)	10	0	(Italian Football Federation) Bologna
13	MF	Taras Romanczuk	14 November 1991 (aged 32)	3	1	(Polish Football Association) Jagiellonia Białystok
14	DF	Jakub Kiwior	15 February 2000 (aged 24)	23	1	(The Football Association) Arsenal
15	DF	Tymoteusz Puchacz	23 January 1999 (aged 25)	14	0	(German Football Association) 1. FC Kaiserslautern
16	FW	Adam Buksa	12 July 1996 (aged 27)	15	6	(Turkish Football Federation) Antalyaspor
17	MF	Damian Szymański	16 June 1995 (aged 28)	18	2	(Hellenic Football Federation) AEK Athens
18	DF	Bartosz Bereszyński	12 July 1992 (aged 31)	55	0	(Italian Football Federation) Empoli
19	DF	Przemysław Frankowski	12 April 1995 (aged 29)	41	3	(French Football Federation) Lens
20	MF	Sebastian Szymański	10 May 1999 (aged 25)	34	3	(Turkish Football Federation) Fenerbahçe
21	MF	Nicola Zalewski	23 January 2002 (aged 22)	18	1	(Italian Football Federation) Roma
22	GK	Marcin Bułka	4 October 1999 (aged 24)	1	0	(French Football Federation) Nice
23	FW	Krzysztof Piątek	1 July 1995 (aged 28)	29	11	(Turkish Football Federation) İstanbul Başakşehir
24	MF	Bartosz Slisz	29 March 1999 (aged 25)	9	0	(United States Soccer Federation) Atlanta United
25	FW	Michał Skóraś	15 February 2000 (aged 24)	8	0	(Royal Belgian Football Association) Club Brugge
26	MF	Kacper Urbański	7 September 2004 (aged 19)	2	0	(Italian Football Federation) Bologna

=== Netherlands ===
Manager: Ronald Koeman

The Netherlands announced a 30-man preliminary squad on 16 May 2024. On 27 May, Marten de Roon withdrew from the squad due to injury. The final squad of 26 players was confirmed on 29 May, with Nick Olij, Ian Maatsen and Quinten Timber missing out. On 10 June, it was announced that Frenkie de Jong would no longer be part of the squad due to injury. On 11 June, Ian Maatsen was called up as a replacement. On 11 June, Teun Koopmeiners had to be withdrawn from the squad due to an injury suffered prior to the friendly match against Iceland. On 12 June, Joshua Zirkzee was added to the squad.

No.	Pos.	Player	Date of birth (age)	Caps	Goals	Club
1	GK	Bart Verbruggen	18 August 2002 (aged 21)	7	0	(The Football Association) Brighton & Hove Albion
2	DF	Lutsharel Geertruida	18 July 2000 (aged 23)	9	0	(Royal Dutch Football Association) Feyenoord
3	DF	Matthijs de Ligt	12 August 1999 (aged 24)	45	2	(German Football Association) Bayern Munich
4	DF	Virgil van Dijk (captain)	8 July 1991 (aged 32)	68	9	(The Football Association) Liverpool
5	DF	Nathan Aké	18 February 1995 (aged 29)	45	5	(The Football Association) Manchester City
6	DF	Stefan de Vrij	5 February 1992 (aged 32)	64	3	(Italian Football Federation) Inter Milan
7	MF	Xavi Simons	21 April 2003 (aged 21)	14	1	(German Football Association) RB Leipzig
8	MF	Georginio Wijnaldum	11 November 1990 (aged 33)	93	28	(Saudi Arabian Football Federation) Al-Ettifaq
9	FW	Wout Weghorst	7 August 1992 (aged 31)	33	11	(German Football Association) TSG Hoffenheim
10	FW	Memphis Depay	13 February 1994 (aged 30)	92	45	(Royal Spanish Football Federation) Atlético Madrid
11	FW	Cody Gakpo	7 May 1999 (aged 25)	24	9	(The Football Association) Liverpool
12	MF	Jeremie Frimpong	10 December 2000 (aged 23)	4	1	(German Football Association) Bayer Leverkusen
13	GK	Justin Bijlow	22 January 1998 (aged 26)	8	0	(Royal Dutch Football Association) Feyenoord
14	MF	Tijjani Reijnders	29 July 1998 (aged 25)	9	1	(Italian Football Federation) Milan
15	DF	Micky van de Ven	19 April 2001 (aged 23)	4	0	(The Football Association) Tottenham Hotspur
16	MF	Joey Veerman	19 November 1998 (aged 25)	10	1	(Royal Dutch Football Association) PSV Eindhoven
17	DF	Daley Blind	9 March 1990 (aged 34)	107	3	(Royal Spanish Football Federation) Girona
18	FW	Donyell Malen	19 January 1999 (aged 25)	32	7	(German Football Association) Borussia Dortmund
19	FW	Brian Brobbey	1 February 2002 (aged 22)	2	0	(Royal Dutch Football Association) Ajax
20	DF	Ian Maatsen	10 March 2002 (aged 22)	0	0	(German Football Association) Borussia Dortmund
21	FW	Joshua Zirkzee	22 May 2001 (aged 23)	0	0	(Italian Football Federation) Bologna
22	DF	Denzel Dumfries	18 April 1996 (aged 28)	53	6	(Italian Football Federation) Inter Milan
23	GK	Mark Flekken	13 June 1993 (aged 31)	7	0	(The Football Association) Brentford
24	MF	Jerdy Schouten	12 January 1997 (aged 27)	5	0	(Royal Dutch Football Association) PSV Eindhoven
25	FW	Steven Bergwijn	8 October 1997 (aged 26)	33	8	(Royal Dutch Football Association) Ajax
26	MF	Ryan Gravenberch	16 May 2002 (aged 22)	12	1	(The Football Association) Liverpool

=== Austria ===
Manager: (Germany) Ralf Rangnick

Austria announced a 29-man preliminary squad on 22 May 2024. Twelve standby players were also given in case of injury or withdrawal. On 7 June, the final 26-man squad was announced, with Tobias Lawal, Stefan Lainer and Thierno Ballo being cut.

No.	Pos.	Player	Date of birth (age)	Caps	Goals	Club
1	GK	Heinz Lindner	17 July 1990 (aged 33)	37	0	(Royal Belgian Football Association) Union Saint-Gilloise
2	DF	Maximilian Wöber	4 February 1998 (aged 26)	25	0	(German Football Association) Borussia Mönchengladbach
3	DF	Gernot Trauner	25 March 1992 (aged 32)	11	1	(Royal Dutch Football Association) Feyenoord
4	DF	Kevin Danso	19 September 1998 (aged 25)	20	0	(French Football Federation) Lens
5	DF	Stefan Posch	14 May 1997 (aged 27)	32	1	(Italian Football Federation) Bologna
6	MF	Nicolas Seiwald	4 May 2001 (aged 23)	24	0	(German Football Association) RB Leipzig
7	FW	Marko Arnautović (captain)	19 April 1989 (aged 35)	112	36	(Italian Football Federation) Inter Milan
8	MF	Alexander Prass	26 May 2001 (aged 23)	5	0	(Austrian Football Association) Sturm Graz
9	MF	Marcel Sabitzer	17 March 1994 (aged 30)	78	17	(German Football Association) Borussia Dortmund
10	MF	Florian Grillitsch	7 August 1995 (aged 28)	43	1	(German Football Association) TSG Hoffenheim
11	FW	Michael Gregoritsch	18 April 1994 (aged 30)	55	15	(German Football Association) SC Freiburg
12	GK	Niklas Hedl	17 March 2001 (aged 23)	1	0	(Austrian Football Association) Rapid Wien
13	GK	Patrick Pentz	2 January 1997 (aged 27)	6	0	(Danish Football Association) Brøndby
14	DF	Leopold Querfeld	20 December 2003 (aged 20)	2	0	(Austrian Football Association) Rapid Wien
15	DF	Philipp Lienhart	11 July 1996 (aged 27)	21	1	(German Football Association) SC Freiburg
16	DF	Phillipp Mwene	29 January 1994 (aged 30)	12	0	(German Football Association) Mainz 05
17	MF	Florian Kainz	24 October 1992 (aged 31)	28	1	(German Football Association) 1. FC Köln
18	MF	Romano Schmid	27 January 2000 (aged 24)	11	0	(German Football Association) Werder Bremen
19	MF	Christoph Baumgartner	1 August 1999 (aged 24)	38	15	(German Football Association) RB Leipzig
20	MF	Konrad Laimer	27 May 1997 (aged 27)	36	4	(German Football Association) Bayern Munich
21	DF	Flavius Daniliuc	27 April 2001 (aged 23)	3	0	(Austrian Football Association) Red Bull Salzburg
22	MF	Matthias Seidl	24 January 2001 (aged 23)	4	0	(Austrian Football Association) Rapid Wien
23	DF	Patrick Wimmer	30 May 2001 (aged 23)	12	1	(German Football Association) VfL Wolfsburg
24	FW	Andreas Weimann	5 August 1991 (aged 32)	24	2	(The Football Association) West Bromwich Albion
25	FW	Maximilian Entrup	25 July 1997 (aged 26)	3	1	(Austrian Football Association) TSV Hartberg
26	MF	Marco Grüll	6 July 1998 (aged 25)	5	0	(Austrian Football Association) Rapid Wien

=== France ===
Manager: Didier Deschamps

France announced their 25-man squad on 16 May 2024.

No.	Pos.	Player	Date of birth (age)	Caps	Goals	Club
1	GK	Brice Samba	25 April 1994 (aged 30)	3	0	(French Football Federation) Lens
2	DF	Benjamin Pavard	28 March 1996 (aged 28)	54	5	(Italian Football Federation) Inter Milan
3	DF	Ferland Mendy	8 June 1995 (aged 29)	10	0	(Royal Spanish Football Federation) Real Madrid
4	DF	Dayot Upamecano	27 October 1998 (aged 25)	20	2	(German Football Association) Bayern Munich
5	DF	Jules Koundé	12 November 1998 (aged 25)	28	0	(Royal Spanish Football Federation) Barcelona
6	MF	Eduardo Camavinga	10 November 2002 (aged 21)	17	1	(Royal Spanish Football Federation) Real Madrid
7	FW	Antoine Griezmann	21 March 1991 (aged 33)	129	44	(Royal Spanish Football Federation) Atlético Madrid
8	MF	Aurélien Tchouaméni	27 January 2000 (aged 24)	31	3	(Royal Spanish Football Federation) Real Madrid
9	FW	Olivier Giroud	30 September 1986 (aged 37)	133	57	(Italian Football Federation) Milan
10	FW	Kylian Mbappé (captain)	20 December 1998 (aged 25)	79	47	(French Football Federation) Paris Saint-Germain
11	FW	Ousmane Dembélé	15 May 1997 (aged 27)	44	5	(French Football Federation) Paris Saint-Germain
12	FW	Randal Kolo Muani	5 December 1998 (aged 25)	17	4	(French Football Federation) Paris Saint-Germain
13	MF	N'Golo Kanté	29 March 1991 (aged 33)	55	2	(Saudi Arabian Football Federation) Al-Ittihad
14	MF	Adrien Rabiot	3 April 1995 (aged 29)	43	4	(Italian Football Federation) Juventus
15	FW	Marcus Thuram	6 August 1997 (aged 26)	20	2	(Italian Football Federation) Inter Milan
16	GK	Mike Maignan	3 July 1995 (aged 28)	16	0	(Italian Football Federation) Milan
17	DF	William Saliba	24 March 2001 (aged 23)	15	0	(The Football Association) Arsenal
18	MF	Warren Zaïre-Emery	8 March 2006 (aged 18)	3	1	(French Football Federation) Paris Saint-Germain
19	MF	Youssouf Fofana	10 January 1999 (aged 25)	18	3	(French Football Federation) Monaco
20	FW	Kingsley Coman	13 June 1996 (aged 28)	56	8	(German Football Association) Bayern Munich
21	DF	Jonathan Clauss	25 September 1992 (aged 31)	13	2	(French Football Federation) Marseille
22	DF	Théo Hernandez	6 October 1997 (aged 26)	27	2	(Italian Football Federation) Milan
23	GK	Alphonse Areola	27 February 1993 (aged 31)	5	0	(The Football Association) West Ham United
24	DF	Ibrahima Konaté	25 May 1999 (aged 25)	16	0	(The Football Association) Liverpool
25	FW	Bradley Barcola	2 September 2002 (aged 21)	2	0	(French Football Federation) Paris Saint-Germain

== Group E ==
=== Belgium ===
Manager: (Italy) Domenico Tedesco

Belgium announced their 25-man squad on 28 May 2024.

No.	Pos.	Player	Date of birth (age)	Caps	Goals	Club
1	GK	Koen Casteels	25 June 1992 (aged 31)	10	0	(German Football Association) VfL Wolfsburg
2	DF	Zeno Debast	24 October 2003 (aged 20)	8	0	(Royal Belgian Football Association) Anderlecht
3	DF	Arthur Theate	25 May 2000 (aged 24)	15	0	(French Football Federation) Rennes
4	DF	Wout Faes	3 April 1998 (aged 26)	15	0	(The Football Association) Leicester City
5	DF	Jan Vertonghen	24 April 1987 (aged 37)	154	10	(Royal Belgian Football Association) Anderlecht
6	MF	Axel Witsel	12 January 1989 (aged 35)	132	12	(Royal Spanish Football Federation) Atlético Madrid
7	MF	Kevin De Bruyne (captain)	28 June 1991 (aged 32)	101	27	(The Football Association) Manchester City
8	MF	Youri Tielemans	7 May 1997 (aged 27)	67	7	(The Football Association) Aston Villa
9	MF	Leandro Trossard	4 December 1994 (aged 29)	34	9	(The Football Association) Arsenal
10	FW	Romelu Lukaku	13 May 1993 (aged 31)	115	85	(Italian Football Federation) Roma
11	FW	Yannick Carrasco	4 September 1993 (aged 30)	74	11	(Saudi Arabian Football Federation) Al-Shabab
12	GK	Thomas Kaminski	23 October 1992 (aged 31)	1	0	(The Football Association) Luton Town
13	GK	Matz Sels	26 February 1992 (aged 32)	8	0	(The Football Association) Nottingham Forest
14	FW	Dodi Lukebakio	24 September 1997 (aged 26)	15	2	(Royal Spanish Football Federation) Sevilla
15	DF	Thomas Meunier	12 September 1991 (aged 32)	66	8	(Turkish Football Federation) Trabzonspor
16	MF	Aster Vranckx	4 October 2002 (aged 21)	7	0	(German Football Association) VfL Wolfsburg
17	FW	Charles De Ketelaere	10 March 2001 (aged 23)	15	2	(Italian Football Federation) Atalanta
18	MF	Orel Mangala	18 March 1998 (aged 26)	15	0	(French Football Federation) Lyon
19	FW	Johan Bakayoko	20 April 2003 (aged 21)	12	1	(Royal Dutch Football Association) PSV Eindhoven
20	FW	Loïs Openda	16 February 2000 (aged 24)	17	2	(German Football Association) RB Leipzig
21	DF	Timothy Castagne	5 December 1995 (aged 28)	43	2	(The Football Association) Fulham
22	FW	Jérémy Doku	27 May 2002 (aged 22)	22	2	(The Football Association) Manchester City
23	MF	Arthur Vermeeren	7 February 2005 (aged 19)	4	0	(Royal Spanish Football Federation) Atlético Madrid
24	MF	Amadou Onana	16 August 2001 (aged 22)	13	0	(The Football Association) Everton
25	MF	Maxim De Cuyper	22 December 2000 (aged 23)	2	0	(Royal Belgian Football Association) Club Brugge

=== Slovakia ===
Manager: (Italy) Francesco Calzona

On 27 May 2024, 32 players were called up to Slovakia's preliminary squad. On 7 June 2024, the final 26-man squad was announced, with Dominik Takáč, Michal Tomič, Matúš Kmeť, Jakub Kadák, Dominik Hollý and Róbert Polievka being left out.

No.	Pos.	Player	Date of birth (age)	Caps	Goals	Club
1	GK	Martin Dúbravka	15 January 1989 (aged 35)	43	0	(The Football Association) Newcastle United
2	DF	Peter Pekarík	30 October 1986 (aged 37)	127	2	(German Football Association) Hertha BSC
3	DF	Denis Vavro	10 April 1996 (aged 28)	20	2	(Danish Football Association) Copenhagen
4	DF	Adam Obert	23 August 2002 (aged 21)	5	0	(Italian Football Federation) Cagliari
5	MF	Tomáš Rigo	3 July 2002 (aged 21)	1	1	(Football Association of the Czech Republic) Baník Ostrava
6	DF	Norbert Gyömbér	3 July 1992 (aged 31)	39	0	(Italian Football Federation) Salernitana
7	FW	Tomáš Suslov	7 June 2002 (aged 22)	28	3	(Italian Football Federation) Hellas Verona
8	MF	Ondrej Duda	5 December 1994 (aged 29)	72	13	(Italian Football Federation) Hellas Verona
9	FW	Róbert Boženík	18 November 1999 (aged 24)	40	7	(Portuguese Football Federation) Boavista
10	FW	Ľubomír Tupta	27 March 1998 (aged 26)	6	0	(Football Association of the Czech Republic) Slovan Liberec
11	MF	László Bénes	9 September 1997 (aged 26)	22	2	(German Football Association) Hamburger SV
12	GK	Marek Rodák	13 December 1996 (aged 27)	22	0	(The Football Association) Fulham
13	MF	Patrik Hrošovský	22 April 1992 (aged 32)	55	0	(Royal Belgian Football Association) Genk
14	DF	Milan Škriniar (captain)	11 February 1995 (aged 29)	68	3	(French Football Federation) Paris Saint-Germain
15	DF	Vernon De Marco	18 November 1992 (aged 31)	10	1	(United Arab Emirates Football Association) Hatta
16	DF	Dávid Hancko	13 December 1997 (aged 26)	38	4	(Royal Dutch Football Association) Feyenoord
17	FW	Lukáš Haraslín	26 May 1996 (aged 28)	36	6	(Football Association of the Czech Republic) Sparta Prague
18	FW	David Strelec	4 April 2001 (aged 23)	18	3	(Slovak Football Association) Slovan Bratislava
19	MF	Juraj Kucka	26 February 1987 (aged 37)	107	14	(Slovak Football Association) Slovan Bratislava
20	FW	Dávid Ďuriš	22 March 1999 (aged 25)	12	1	(Italian Football Federation) Ascoli
21	MF	Matúš Bero	6 September 1995 (aged 28)	30	1	(German Football Association) VfL Bochum
22	MF	Stanislav Lobotka	25 November 1994 (aged 29)	55	4	(Italian Football Federation) Napoli
23	GK	Henrich Ravas	16 August 1997 (aged 26)	0	0	(United States Soccer Federation) New England Revolution
24	FW	Leo Sauer	16 December 2005 (aged 18)	2	0	(Royal Dutch Football Association) Feyenoord
25	DF	Sebastian Kóša	13 September 2003 (aged 20)	1	0	(Slovak Football Association) Spartak Trnava
26	FW	Ivan Schranz	13 September 1993 (aged 30)	22	3	(Football Association of the Czech Republic) Slavia Prague

=== Romania ===
Manager: Edward Iordănescu

Romania's preliminary list of 28 players was announced on 24 May 2024. The final list was announced on 7 June, excluding Răzvan Sava and Constantin Grameni.

No.	Pos.	Player	Date of birth (age)	Caps	Goals	Club
1	GK	Florin Niță	3 July 1987 (aged 36)	21	0	(Turkish Football Federation) Gaziantep
2	DF	Andrei Rațiu	20 June 1998 (aged 25)	17	1	(Royal Spanish Football Federation) Rayo Vallecano
3	DF	Radu Drăgușin	3 February 2002 (aged 22)	17	0	(The Football Association) Tottenham Hotspur
4	DF	Adrian Rus	18 March 1996 (aged 28)	20	1	(Cyprus Football Association) Pafos
5	DF	Ionuț Nedelcearu	25 April 1996 (aged 28)	27	2	(Italian Football Federation) Palermo
6	MF	Marius Marin	30 August 1998 (aged 25)	18	0	(Italian Football Federation) Pisa
7	FW	Denis Alibec	5 January 1991 (aged 33)	37	5	(Qatar Football Association) Muaither
8	MF	Alexandru Cicâldău	8 July 1997 (aged 26)	37	4	(Turkish Football Federation) Konyaspor
9	FW	George Pușcaș	8 April 1996 (aged 28)	42	11	(Italian Football Federation) Bari
10	MF	Ianis Hagi	22 October 1998 (aged 25)	35	5	(Royal Spanish Football Federation) Alavés
11	DF	Nicușor Bancu	18 September 1992 (aged 31)	36	2	(Romanian Football Federation) Universitatea Craiova
12	GK	Horațiu Moldovan	20 January 1998 (aged 26)	11	0	(Royal Spanish Football Federation) Atlético Madrid
13	FW	Valentin Mihăilă	2 February 2000 (aged 24)	21	4	(Italian Football Federation) Parma
14	MF	Darius Olaru	3 March 1998 (aged 26)	18	0	(Romanian Football Federation) FCSB
15	DF	Andrei Burcă	15 April 1993 (aged 31)	27	1	(Saudi Arabian Football Federation) Al-Okhdood
16	GK	Ștefan Târnovanu	9 May 2000 (aged 24)	1	0	(Romanian Football Federation) FCSB
17	FW	Florinel Coman	10 April 1998 (aged 26)	15	1	(Romanian Football Federation) FCSB
18	MF	Răzvan Marin	23 May 1996 (aged 28)	55	3	(Italian Football Federation) Empoli
19	FW	Denis Drăguș	6 July 1999 (aged 24)	11	2	(Turkish Football Federation) Gaziantep
20	FW	Dennis Man	26 August 1998 (aged 25)	24	7	(Italian Football Federation) Parma
21	MF	Nicolae Stanciu (captain)	7 May 1993 (aged 31)	70	14	(Saudi Arabian Football Federation) Damac
22	DF	Vasile Mogoș	31 October 1992 (aged 31)	7	0	(Romanian Football Federation) CFR Cluj
23	MF	Deian Sorescu	29 August 1997 (aged 26)	17	0	(Turkish Football Federation) Gaziantep
24	DF	Bogdan Racovițan	6 June 2000 (aged 24)	2	0	(Polish Football Association) Raków Częstochowa
25	FW	Daniel Bîrligea	19 April 2000 (aged 24)	2	0	(Romanian Football Federation) CFR Cluj
26	MF	Adrian Șut	30 April 1999 (aged 25)	2	0	(Romanian Football Federation) FCSB

=== Ukraine ===
Manager: Serhiy Rebrov

Ukraine announced their 26-man squad on 16 May 2024.

No.	Pos.	Player	Date of birth (age)	Caps	Goals	Club
1	GK	Heorhiy Bushchan	31 May 1994 (aged 30)	18	0	(Ukrainian Association of Football) Dynamo Kyiv
2	DF	Yukhym Konoplya	26 August 1999 (aged 24)	14	1	(Ukrainian Association of Football) Shakhtar Donetsk
3	DF	Oleksandr Svatok	27 September 1994 (aged 29)	6	0	(Ukrainian Association of Football) Dnipro-1
4	DF	Maksym Talovierov	28 June 2000 (aged 23)	3	0	(Austrian Football Association) LASK
5	MF	Serhiy Sydorchuk	2 May 1991 (aged 33)	61	3	(Royal Belgian Football Association) Westerlo
6	MF	Taras Stepanenko	8 August 1989 (aged 34)	83	4	(Ukrainian Association of Football) Shakhtar Donetsk
7	MF	Andriy Yarmolenko (captain)	23 October 1989 (aged 34)	119	46	(Ukrainian Association of Football) Dynamo Kyiv
8	MF	Ruslan Malinovskyi	4 May 1993 (aged 31)	61	7	(Italian Football Federation) Genoa
9	FW	Roman Yaremchuk	27 November 1995 (aged 28)	50	15	(Royal Spanish Football Federation) Valencia
10	FW	Mykhailo Mudryk	5 January 2001 (aged 23)	21	2	(The Football Association) Chelsea
11	FW	Artem Dovbyk	21 June 1997 (aged 26)	28	10	(Royal Spanish Football Federation) Girona
12	GK	Anatoliy Trubin	1 August 2001 (aged 22)	11	0	(Portuguese Football Federation) Benfica
13	DF	Illia Zabarnyi	1 September 2002 (aged 21)	36	1	(The Football Association) Bournemouth
14	MF	Heorhiy Sudakov	1 September 2002 (aged 21)	17	2	(Ukrainian Association of Football) Shakhtar Donetsk
15	MF	Viktor Tsyhankov	15 November 1997 (aged 26)	54	13	(Royal Spanish Football Federation) Girona
16	DF	Vitaliy Mykolenko	29 May 1999 (aged 25)	41	1	(The Football Association) Everton
17	DF	Oleksandr Zinchenko	15 December 1996 (aged 27)	63	9	(The Football Association) Arsenal
18	MF	Volodymyr Brazhko	23 January 2002 (aged 22)	4	0	(Ukrainian Association of Football) Dynamo Kyiv
19	MF	Mykola Shaparenko	4 October 1998 (aged 25)	31	1	(Ukrainian Association of Football) Dynamo Kyiv
20	MF	Oleksandr Zubkov	3 August 1996 (aged 27)	33	2	(Ukrainian Association of Football) Shakhtar Donetsk
21	DF	Valeriy Bondar	27 February 1999 (aged 25)	4	0	(Ukrainian Association of Football) Shakhtar Donetsk
22	DF	Mykola Matviyenko	2 May 1996 (aged 28)	65	0	(Ukrainian Association of Football) Shakhtar Donetsk
23	GK	Andriy Lunin	11 February 1999 (aged 25)	12	0	(Royal Spanish Football Federation) Real Madrid
24	DF	Oleksandr Tymchyk	20 January 1997 (aged 27)	17	1	(Ukrainian Association of Football) Dynamo Kyiv
25	FW	Vladyslav Vanat	4 January 2002 (aged 22)	6	0	(Ukrainian Association of Football) Dynamo Kyiv
26	DF	Bohdan Mykhaylichenko	21 March 1997 (aged 27)	8	0	(Ukrainian Association of Football) Polissya Zhytomyr

== Group F ==
=== Turkey ===
Manager: (Italy) Vincenzo Montella

Turkey announced their 35-man preliminary squad on 24 May 2024. On 29 May, the squad was reduced to 33 players after Bertuğ Yıldırım was called up to the under-21 team and Çağlar Söyüncü withdrew due to injury. On 1 June, Enes Ünal also withdrew due to injury. On 5 June, Ozan Kabak withdrew from the preliminary squad due to knee injury. On 7 June 2024, the final 26-man squad was announced, with Abdülkadir Ömür, Cenk Özkacar, Berat Özdemir, Oğuz Aydın, Can Uzun and Doğan Alemdar being excluded and Bertuğ Yıldırım being called up again.

No.	Pos.	Player	Date of birth (age)	Caps	Goals	Club
1	GK	Mert Günok	1 March 1989 (aged 35)	29	0	(Turkish Football Federation) Beşiktaş
2	DF	Zeki Çelik	17 February 1997 (aged 27)	45	2	(Italian Football Federation) Roma
3	DF	Merih Demiral	5 March 1998 (aged 26)	44	2	(Saudi Arabian Football Federation) Al-Ahli
4	DF	Samet Akaydin	13 March 1994 (aged 30)	6	0	(Hellenic Football Federation) Panathinaikos
5	MF	Okay Yokuşlu	9 March 1994 (aged 30)	40	1	(The Football Association) West Bromwich Albion
6	MF	Orkun Kökçü	29 December 2000 (aged 23)	28	2	(Portuguese Football Federation) Benfica
7	FW	Kerem Aktürkoğlu	21 October 1998 (aged 25)	29	5	(Turkish Football Federation) Galatasaray
8	MF	Arda Güler	25 February 2005 (aged 19)	7	1	(Royal Spanish Football Federation) Real Madrid
9	FW	Cenk Tosun	7 June 1991 (aged 33)	51	20	(Turkish Football Federation) Beşiktaş
10	MF	Hakan Çalhanoğlu (captain)	8 February 1994 (aged 30)	86	18	(Italian Football Federation) Inter Milan
11	MF	Yusuf Yazıcı	29 January 1997 (aged 27)	43	3	(French Football Federation) Lille
12	GK	Altay Bayındır	14 April 1998 (aged 26)	9	0	(The Football Association) Manchester United
13	DF	Ahmetcan Kaplan	16 January 2003 (aged 21)	0	0	(Royal Dutch Football Association) Ajax
14	DF	Abdülkerim Bardakcı	7 September 1994 (aged 29)	8	1	(Turkish Football Federation) Galatasaray
15	MF	Salih Özcan	11 January 1998 (aged 26)	18	0	(German Football Association) Borussia Dortmund
16	MF	İsmail Yüksek	26 January 1999 (aged 25)	14	1	(Turkish Football Federation) Fenerbahçe
17	MF	İrfan Can Kahveci	15 July 1995 (aged 28)	32	2	(Turkish Football Federation) Fenerbahçe
18	DF	Mert Müldür	3 April 1999 (aged 25)	24	1	(Turkish Football Federation) Fenerbahçe
19	FW	Kenan Yıldız	4 May 2005 (aged 19)	7	1	(Italian Football Federation) Juventus
20	DF	Ferdi Kadıoğlu	7 October 1999 (aged 24)	15	1	(Turkish Football Federation) Fenerbahçe
21	FW	Barış Alper Yılmaz	23 May 2000 (aged 24)	15	2	(Turkish Football Federation) Galatasaray
22	DF	Kaan Ayhan	10 November 1994 (aged 29)	58	5	(Turkish Football Federation) Galatasaray
23	GK	Uğurcan Çakır	5 April 1996 (aged 28)	27	0	(Turkish Football Federation) Trabzonspor
24	FW	Semih Kılıçsoy	15 August 2005 (aged 18)	2	0	(Turkish Football Federation) Beşiktaş
25	MF	Yunus Akgün	7 July 2000 (aged 23)	9	2	(The Football Association) Leicester City
26	FW	Bertuğ Yıldırım	12 January 2002 (aged 22)	3	2	(French Football Federation) Rennes

=== Georgia ===
Manager: (France) Willy Sagnol

Georgia announced their 26-man squad on 22 May 2024. On 24 May, Jaba Kankava declined his spot on the team and was later replaced by Gabriel Sigua.

No.	Pos.	Player	Date of birth (age)	Caps	Goals	Club
1	GK	Giorgi Loria	27 January 1986 (aged 38)	78	0	(Georgian Football Federation) Dinamo Tbilisi
2	DF	Otar Kakabadze	27 June 1995 (aged 28)	61	0	(Polish Football Association) Cracovia
3	DF	Lasha Dvali	14 May 1995 (aged 29)	32	1	(Cyprus Football Association) APOEL
4	DF	Guram Kashia (captain)	4 July 1987 (aged 36)	113	3	(Slovak Football Association) Slovan Bratislava
5	DF	Solomon Kvirkvelia	6 February 1992 (aged 32)	58	0	(Saudi Arabian Football Federation) Al-Okhdood
6	MF	Giorgi Kochorashvili	29 June 1999 (aged 24)	8	0	(Royal Spanish Football Federation) Levante
7	FW	Khvicha Kvaratskhelia	12 February 2001 (aged 23)	30	15	(Italian Football Federation) Napoli
8	FW	Budu Zivzivadze	10 March 1994 (aged 30)	26	8	(German Football Association) Karlsruher SC
9	MF	Zuriko Davitashvili	15 February 2001 (aged 23)	35	6	(French Football Federation) Bordeaux
10	MF	Giorgi Chakvetadze	29 August 1999 (aged 24)	25	8	(The Football Association) Watford
11	FW	Giorgi Kvilitaia	1 October 1993 (aged 30)	37	6	(Cyprus Football Association) APOEL
12	GK	Luka Gugeshashvili	29 April 1999 (aged 25)	1	0	(Association of Football Federations of Azerbaijan) Qarabağ
13	DF	Giorgi Gocholeishvili	14 February 2001 (aged 23)	8	0	(Ukrainian Association of Football) Shakhtar Donetsk
14	DF	Luka Lochoshvili	29 May 1998 (aged 26)	10	1	(Italian Football Federation) Cremonese
15	DF	Giorgi Gvelesiani	5 May 1991 (aged 33)	1	0	(Football Federation Islamic Republic of Iran) Persepolis
16	MF	Nika Kvekveskiri	29 May 1992 (aged 32)	60	0	(Polish Football Association) Lech Poznań
17	MF	Otar Kiteishvili	26 March 1996 (aged 28)	37	3	(Austrian Football Association) Sturm Graz
18	MF	Sandro Altunashvili	19 May 1997 (aged 27)	5	0	(Austrian Football Association) Wolfsberger AC
19	MF	Levan Shengelia	27 October 1995 (aged 28)	17	1	(Hellenic Football Federation) Panetolikos
20	MF	Anzor Mekvabishvili	5 June 2001 (aged 23)	14	0	(Romanian Football Federation) Universitatea Craiova
21	MF	Giorgi Tsitaishvili	18 November 2000 (aged 23)	17	1	(Georgian Football Federation) Dinamo Batumi
22	FW	Georges Mikautadze	31 October 2000 (aged 23)	25	10	(French Football Federation) Metz
23	MF	Saba Lobzhanidze	18 December 1994 (aged 29)	36	3	(United States Soccer Federation) Atlanta United
24	DF	Jemal Tabidze	18 March 1996 (aged 28)	15	1	(Hellenic Football Federation) Panetolikos
25	GK	Giorgi Mamardashvili	29 September 2000 (aged 23)	17	0	(Royal Spanish Football Federation) Valencia
26	MF	Gabriel Sigua	30 June 2005 (aged 18)	2	0	(Swiss Football Association) Basel

=== Portugal ===
Manager: (Spain) Roberto Martínez

Portugal announced their 26-man squad on 21 May 2024. On 3 June 2024, Otávio withdrew due to injury and was replaced by Matheus Nunes.

No.	Pos.	Player	Date of birth (age)	Caps	Goals	Club
1	GK	Rui Patrício	15 February 1988 (aged 36)	108	0	(Italian Football Federation) Roma
2	DF	Nélson Semedo	16 November 1993 (aged 30)	30	0	(The Football Association) Wolverhampton Wanderers
3	DF	Pepe	26 February 1983 (aged 41)	137	8	(Portuguese Football Federation) Porto
4	DF	Rúben Dias	14 May 1997 (aged 27)	56	3	(The Football Association) Manchester City
5	DF	Diogo Dalot	18 March 1999 (aged 25)	20	2	(The Football Association) Manchester United
6	MF	João Palhinha	9 July 1995 (aged 28)	27	2	(The Football Association) Fulham
7	FW	Cristiano Ronaldo (captain)	5 February 1985 (aged 39)	207	130	(Saudi Arabian Football Federation) Al Nassr
8	MF	Bruno Fernandes	8 September 1994 (aged 29)	67	22	(The Football Association) Manchester United
9	FW	Gonçalo Ramos	20 June 2001 (aged 22)	13	8	(French Football Federation) Paris Saint-Germain
10	MF	Bernardo Silva	10 August 1994 (aged 29)	89	11	(The Football Association) Manchester City
11	FW	João Félix	10 November 1999 (aged 24)	39	8	(Royal Spanish Football Federation) Barcelona
12	GK	José Sá	17 January 1993 (aged 31)	2	0	(The Football Association) Wolverhampton Wanderers
13	MF	Danilo Pereira	9 September 1991 (aged 32)	73	2	(French Football Federation) Paris Saint-Germain
14	DF	Gonçalo Inácio	25 August 2001 (aged 22)	9	2	(Portuguese Football Federation) Sporting CP
15	MF	João Neves	27 September 2004 (aged 19)	7	0	(Portuguese Football Federation) Benfica
16	MF	Matheus Nunes	27 August 1998 (aged 25)	14	2	(The Football Association) Manchester City
17	FW	Rafael Leão	10 June 1999 (aged 25)	27	4	(Italian Football Federation) Milan
18	MF	Rúben Neves	13 March 1997 (aged 27)	47	0	(Saudi Arabian Football Federation) Al Hilal
19	DF	Nuno Mendes	19 June 2002 (aged 21)	23	0	(French Football Federation) Paris Saint-Germain
20	DF	João Cancelo	27 May 1994 (aged 30)	54	10	(Royal Spanish Football Federation) Barcelona
21	FW	Diogo Jota	4 December 1996 (aged 27)	39	14	(The Football Association) Liverpool
22	GK	Diogo Costa	19 September 1999 (aged 24)	22	0	(Portuguese Football Federation) Porto
23	MF	Vitinha	13 February 2000 (aged 24)	17	0	(French Football Federation) Paris Saint-Germain
24	DF	António Silva	30 October 2003 (aged 20)	11	0	(Portuguese Football Federation) Benfica
25	MF	Pedro Neto	9 March 2000 (aged 24)	7	1	(The Football Association) Wolverhampton Wanderers
26	FW	Francisco Conceição	14 December 2002 (aged 21)	2	0	(Portuguese Football Federation) Porto

=== Czech Republic ===
Manager: Ivan Hašek

The Czech Republic announced their 26-man final squad on 28 May 2024. On 9 June 2024, Michal Sadílek was forced to withdraw from the squad after injuring his leg in a cycling accident. On 12 June 2024, it was announced that Sadílek would be replaced by Petr Ševčík.

No.	Pos.	Player	Date of birth (age)	Caps	Goals	Club
1	GK	Jindřich Staněk	27 April 1996 (aged 28)	10	0	(Football Association of the Czech Republic) Slavia Prague
2	DF	David Zima	8 November 2000 (aged 23)	21	1	(Football Association of the Czech Republic) Slavia Prague
3	MF	Tomáš Holeš	31 March 1993 (aged 31)	28	2	(Football Association of the Czech Republic) Slavia Prague
4	DF	Robin Hranáč	29 January 2000 (aged 24)	3	0	(Football Association of the Czech Republic) Viktoria Plzeň
5	DF	Vladimír Coufal	22 August 1992 (aged 31)	42	1	(The Football Association) West Ham United
6	DF	Martin Vitík	21 January 2003 (aged 21)	2	0	(Football Association of the Czech Republic) Sparta Prague
7	MF	Antonín Barák	3 December 1994 (aged 29)	41	11	(Italian Football Federation) Fiorentina
8	MF	Petr Ševčík	4 May 1994 (aged 30)	15	0	(Football Association of the Czech Republic) Slavia Prague
9	FW	Adam Hložek	25 July 2002 (aged 21)	32	2	(German Football Association) Bayer Leverkusen
10	FW	Patrik Schick	24 January 1996 (aged 28)	38	19	(German Football Association) Bayer Leverkusen
11	FW	Jan Kuchta	8 January 1997 (aged 27)	21	3	(Football Association of the Czech Republic) Sparta Prague
12	DF	David Douděra	31 May 1998 (aged 26)	9	1	(Football Association of the Czech Republic) Slavia Prague
13	FW	Mojmír Chytil	29 April 1999 (aged 25)	14	6	(Football Association of the Czech Republic) Slavia Prague
14	MF	Lukáš Provod	23 October 1996 (aged 27)	19	2	(Football Association of the Czech Republic) Slavia Prague
15	DF	David Jurásek	7 August 2000 (aged 23)	9	1	(German Football Association) TSG Hoffenheim
16	GK	Matěj Kovář	17 May 2000 (aged 24)	2	0	(German Football Association) Bayer Leverkusen
17	FW	Václav Černý	17 October 1997 (aged 26)	16	6	(German Football Association) VfL Wolfsburg
18	DF	Ladislav Krejčí	20 April 1999 (aged 25)	10	3	(Football Association of the Czech Republic) Sparta Prague
19	FW	Tomáš Chorý	26 January 1995 (aged 29)	5	2	(Football Association of the Czech Republic) Viktoria Plzeň
20	MF	Ondřej Lingr	7 October 1998 (aged 25)	15	1	(Royal Dutch Football Association) Feyenoord
21	MF	Lukáš Červ	10 April 2001 (aged 23)	1	0	(Football Association of the Czech Republic) Viktoria Plzeň
22	MF	Tomáš Souček (captain)	27 February 1995 (aged 29)	69	12	(The Football Association) West Ham United
23	GK	Vítězslav Jaroš	23 July 2001 (aged 22)	1	0	(Austrian Football Association) Sturm Graz
24	DF	Tomáš Vlček	28 February 2001 (aged 23)	2	0	(Football Association of the Czech Republic) Slavia Prague
25	MF	Pavel Šulc	29 December 2000 (aged 23)	3	0	(Football Association of the Czech Republic) Viktoria Plzeň
26	MF	Matěj Jurásek	30 August 2003 (aged 20)	2	1	(Football Association of the Czech Republic) Slavia Prague

== Statistics ==
=== Age ===
==== Outfield players ====
- Oldest: (Portugal) Pepe (41 years, 109 days)
- Youngest: (Spain) Lamine Yamal (16 years, 337 days)

==== Goalkeepers ====
- Oldest: (Georgia (country)) Giorgi Loria (38 years, 139 days)
- Youngest: (Netherlands) Bart Verbruggen (21 years, 301 days)

==== Captains ====
- Oldest: (Portugal) Cristiano Ronaldo (39 years, 130 days)
- Youngest: (Hungary) Dominik Szoboszlai (23 years, 233 days)

==== Coaches ====
- Oldest: (Germany) Ralf Rangnick (65 years, 351 days) (Austria)
- Youngest: (Germany) Julian Nagelsmann (36 years, 327 days)

=== Caps ===
- The tournament featured 30 players with at least 100 international caps for their country:
  - 207 caps – (Portugal) Cristiano Ronaldo
  - 175 caps – (Croatia) Luka Modrić
  - 154 caps – (Belgium) Jan Vertonghen
  - 150 caps – (Poland) Robert Lewandowski
  - 137 caps – (Portugal) Pepe
  - 133 caps – (France) Olivier Giroud
  - 132 caps – (Belgium) Axel Witsel and (Denmark) Simon Kjær
  - 131 caps – (Croatia) Ivan Perišić
  - 130 caps – (Denmark) Christian Eriksen
  - 129 caps – (Germany) Thomas Müller and (France) Antoine Griezmann
  - 127 caps – (Slovakia) Peter Pekarík
  - 125 caps – (Switzerland) Granit Xhaka
  - 123 caps – (Switzerland) Xherdan Shaqiri
  - 119 caps – (Germany) Manuel Neuer and (Ukraine) Andriy Yarmolenko
  - 115 caps – (Belgium) Romelu Lukaku and (Switzerland) Ricardo Rodriguez
  - 113 caps – (Georgia (country)) Guram Kashia
  - 112 caps – (Austria) Marko Arnautović
  - 109 caps – (Germany) Toni Kroos
  - 108 caps – (Portugal) Rui Patrício and (Serbia) Dušan Tadić
  - 107 caps – (Netherlands) Daley Blind and (Slovakia) Juraj Kucka
  - 105 caps – (Croatia) Domagoj Vida
  - 101 caps – (Belgium) Kevin De Bruyne, (Croatia) Mateo Kovačić and (Denmark) Kasper Schmeichel

=== Player representation by league system ===
Nations in bold were represented at the tournament. Nations in italics were not a member of UEFA.

Country	Players	Percent	Outside national squad	Lower tier players
**England**	114	18.33%	90	18
**Italy**	104	16.72%	81	13
**Germany**	81	13.02%	61	5
**Spain**	56	9.00%	37	1
**France** (Note: Includes players from AS Monaco, which is based in Monaco but is a member of the French Football Federation (FFF) and plays in the French league system. The Monégasque Football Federation is not a UEFA member.)	31	4.98%	23	1
**Turkey**	25	4.02%	13	0
**Czech Republic**	22	3.54%	6	0
**Austria**	16	2.57%	9	0
**Netherlands**	15	2.41%	9	0
**Ukraine**	15	2.41%	1	0
Saudi Arabia	14	2.25%	14	0
**Belgium**	12	1.93%	9	0
Greece	12	1.93%	12	0
**Portugal**	12	1.93%	6	0
**Romania**	10	1.61%	3	0
**Hungary**	9	1.45%	0	0
**Croatia**	8	1.29%	2	0
**Poland**	8	1.29%	5	0
**Scotland**	8	1.29%	0	0
United States	7	1.13%	7	0
Cyprus	6	0.96%	6	0
**Switzerland**	6	0.96%	4	0
**Slovakia**	5	0.80%	2	0
**Denmark**	4	0.64%	4	0
Russia	4	0.64%	4	0
**Serbia**	3	0.48%	0	0
**Slovenia**	3	0.48%	0	0
Bulgaria	2	0.32%	2	0
**Georgia**	2	0.32%	0	0
South Korea	2	0.32%	2	0
United Arab Emirates	2	0.32%	2	0
Azerbaijan	1	0.16%	1	0
Iran	1	0.16%	1	0
Norway	1	0.16%	1	0
Qatar	1	0.16%	1	0
Total	622	100%	418 (67.20%)	38 (6.11%)

=== Player representation by club ===
Players	Clubs
13	(England) Manchester City (Italy) Inter Milan
12	(France) Paris Saint-Germain (Spain) Real Madrid
11	(Germany) RB Leipzig (Spain) Barcelona
10	(Czech Republic) Slavia Prague (England) Arsenal (Germany) Bayer Leverkusen (Germany) Bayern Munich
9	(England) Liverpool (Italy) Bologna (Italy) Juventus (Italy) Roma
8	(England) Manchester United (Germany) Borussia Dortmund (Germany) VfL Wolfsburg (Italy) Milan

Clubs with fewer than 8 players:
Players	Clubs
7	(England) Brentford (Netherlands) Feyenoord (Spain) Atlético Madrid (Turkey) Fenerbahçe (Ukraine) Shakhtar Donetsk
6	(Belgium) Anderlecht (Czech Republic) Sparta Prague (Germany) TSG Hoffenheim (Italy) Napoli (Italy) Torino (Spain) Real Sociedad (Ukraine) Dynamo Kyiv
5	(Austria) Sturm Graz (England) Brighton & Hove Albion (England) Chelsea (England) Crystal Palace (England) Fulham (Germany) VfB Stuttgart (Greece) Panathinaikos (Italy) Empoli (Italy) Hellas Verona (Netherlands) Ajax (Portugal) Benfica
4	(Austria) Rapid Wien (Austria) Red Bull Salzburg (Czech Republic) Viktoria Plzen (England) Aston Villa (England) Leicester City (England) Newcastle United (England) Tottenham Hotspur (England) West Ham United (Germany) SC Freiburg (Greece) AEK Athens (Italy) Atalanta (Romania) FCSB (Scotland) Celtic (Turkey) Beşiktaş (Turkey) Galatasaray
3	(Belgium) Club Brugge (Croatia) Dinamo Zagreb (Croatia) Rijeka (Cyprus) APOEL (England) Bournemouth (England) Everton (England) Norwich City (England) Southampton (England) Wolverhampton Wanderers (France) Lens (France) Monaco (France) Rennes (Germany) Union Berlin (Hungary) Ferencváros (Italy) Lecce (Italy) Parma (Italy) Sassuolo (Italy) Udinese (Netherlands) PSV Eindhoven (Poland) Lech Poznań (Portugal) Porto (Romania) CFR Cluj (Saudi Arabia) Al Hilal (Saudi Arabia) Al Nassr (Slovakia) Slovan Bratislava (Spain) Athletic Bilbao (Spain) Girona (Spain) Sevilla (Turkey) Gaziantep
2	(Bulgaria) Ludogorets Razgrad (Croatia) Hajduk Split (Cyprus) Pafos (Denmark) Copenhagen (England) Bristol City (England) Burnley (England) Watford (England) West Bromwich Albion (France) Bordeaux (Germany) Borussia Mönchengladbach (Germany) Hertha BSC (Germany) Mainz 05 (Germany) Werder Bremen (Greece) Panetolikos (Italy) Fiorentina (Italy) Genoa (Italy) Lazio (Italy) Pisa (Portugal) Sporting CP (Romania) Universitatea Craiova (Saudi Arabia) Al-Ettifaq (Saudi Arabia) Al-Okhdood (Scotland) Heart of Midlothian (Serbia) Red Star Belgrade (Slovakia) Spartak Trnava (Spain) Rayo Vallecano (Spain) Valencia (Switzerland) Lugano (Turkey) Trabzonspor (United States) Atlanta United
1	(Austria) LASK (Austria) TSV Hartberg (Austria) Wolfsberger AC (Azerbaijan) Qarabağ (Belgium) Genk (Belgium) Union Saint-Gilloise (Belgium) Westerlo (Cyprus) Omonia (Czech Republic) Baník Ostrava (Czech Republic) Slovan Liberec (Denmark) Brøndby (Denmark) Vejle; Leeds United; Luton Town; Nottingham Forest; Sunderland (France) Le Havre (France) Lille (France) Lorient (France) Lyon (France) Marseille (France) Metz (France) Nice (France) Toulouse (Georgia (country)) Dinamo Batumi (Georgia (country)) Dinamo Tbilisi (Germany) 1. FC Kaiserslautern (Germany) 1. FC Köln (Germany) FC Augsburg (Germany) Darmstadt 98 (Germany) Eintracht Frankfurt (Germany) Hamburger SV (Germany) Karlsruher SC (Germany) VfL Bochum (Greece) PAOK (Hungary) Fehérvár (Hungary) Kecskemét (Hungary) MTK Budapest (Hungary) Paks (Hungary) Puskás Akadémia (Hungary) Újpest (Iran) Persepolis (Italy) Ascoli (Italy) Bari (Italy) Cagliari (Italy) Cittadella (Italy) Cremonese (Italy) Palermo (Italy) Salernitana (Italy) Sampdoria (Italy) Spezia (Italy) Südtirol (Norway) Bodø/Glimt (Poland) Cracovia (Poland) Górnik Zabrze (Poland) Jagiellonia Białystok (Poland) Pogoń Szczecin (Poland) Raków Częstochowa (Portugal) Boavista (Portugal) Famalicão (Qatar) Muaither (Romania) Voluntari (Russia) Lokomotiv Moscow (Russia) Rubin Kazan (Russia) Sochi (Russia) Spartak Moscow (Saudi Arabia) Al-Ahli (Saudi Arabia) Al-Ittihad (Saudi Arabia) Al-Shabab (Saudi Arabia) Damac (Scotland) Motherwell (Scotland) Rangers (Serbia) TSC (Slovenia) Celje (Slovenia) Maribor (Slovenia) Olimpija Ljubljana (South Korea) Gwangju (South Korea) Ulsan HD (Spain) Alavés (Spain) Getafe (Spain) Levante (Spain) Mallorca (Spain) Osasuna (Spain) Real Betis (Spain) Villarreal (Switzerland) Basel (Switzerland) Grasshopper (Switzerland) Luzern (Switzerland) Servette (Turkey) Alanyaspor (Turkey) Antalyaspor (Turkey) İstanbul Başakşehir (Turkey) Konyaspor (Turkey) Sivasspor (Ukraine) Dnipro-1 (Ukraine) Polissya Zhytomyr (United Arab Emirates) Baniyas (United Arab Emirates) Hatta (United States) Chicago Fire (United States) New England Revolution (United States) New York Red Bulls (United States) Orlando City (United States) Philadelphia Union

=== Coaches representation by country ===
Coaches in bold represented their own country.

No.	Country	Coaches
5	Italy	Francesco Calzona (Slovakia), Vincenzo Montella (Turkey), Domenico Tedesco (Belgium), Marco Rossi (Hungary), **Luciano Spalletti**
2	France	**Didier Deschamps**, Willy Sagnol (Georgia)
2	Germany	**Julian Nagelsmann**, Ralf Rangnick (Austria)
2	Spain	**Luis de la Fuente**, Roberto Martínez (Portugal)
1	Brazil	Sylvinho (Albania)
1	Croatia	**Zlatko Dalić**
1	Czech Republic	**Ivan Hašek**
1	Denmark	**Kasper Hjulmand**
1	England	**Gareth Southgate**
1	Netherlands	**Ronald Koeman**
1	Poland	**Michał Probierz**
1	Romania	**Edward Iordănescu**
1	Scotland	**Steve Clarke**
1	Serbia	**Dragan Stojković**
1	Slovenia	**Matjaž Kek**
1	Switzerland	**Murat Yakin**
1	Ukraine	**Serhiy Rebrov**
