= Maurice Revelli =

Monegasque footballer (born 1964)

Personal information
- Full name: Maurice Revelli
- Date of birth: 4 September 1964 (age 62)
- Place of birth: Monaco
- Height: 1.82 m (5 ft 11 1/2 in)
- Position: Defender

Senior career*
Years	Team	Apps	(Gls)
1981–1988	Monaco	3	(0)
1988–1991	Chamois Niortais	68	(0)
1991–1994	Épinal	76	(1)
- * Club domestic league appearances and goals

Maurice Revelli (born 4 September 1964) is a Monegasque former professional footballer who played as a defender.

== See also ==
- Football in Monaco
- List of football clubs in Monaco
