= Filippo Antonio Revelli =

Italian mathematician

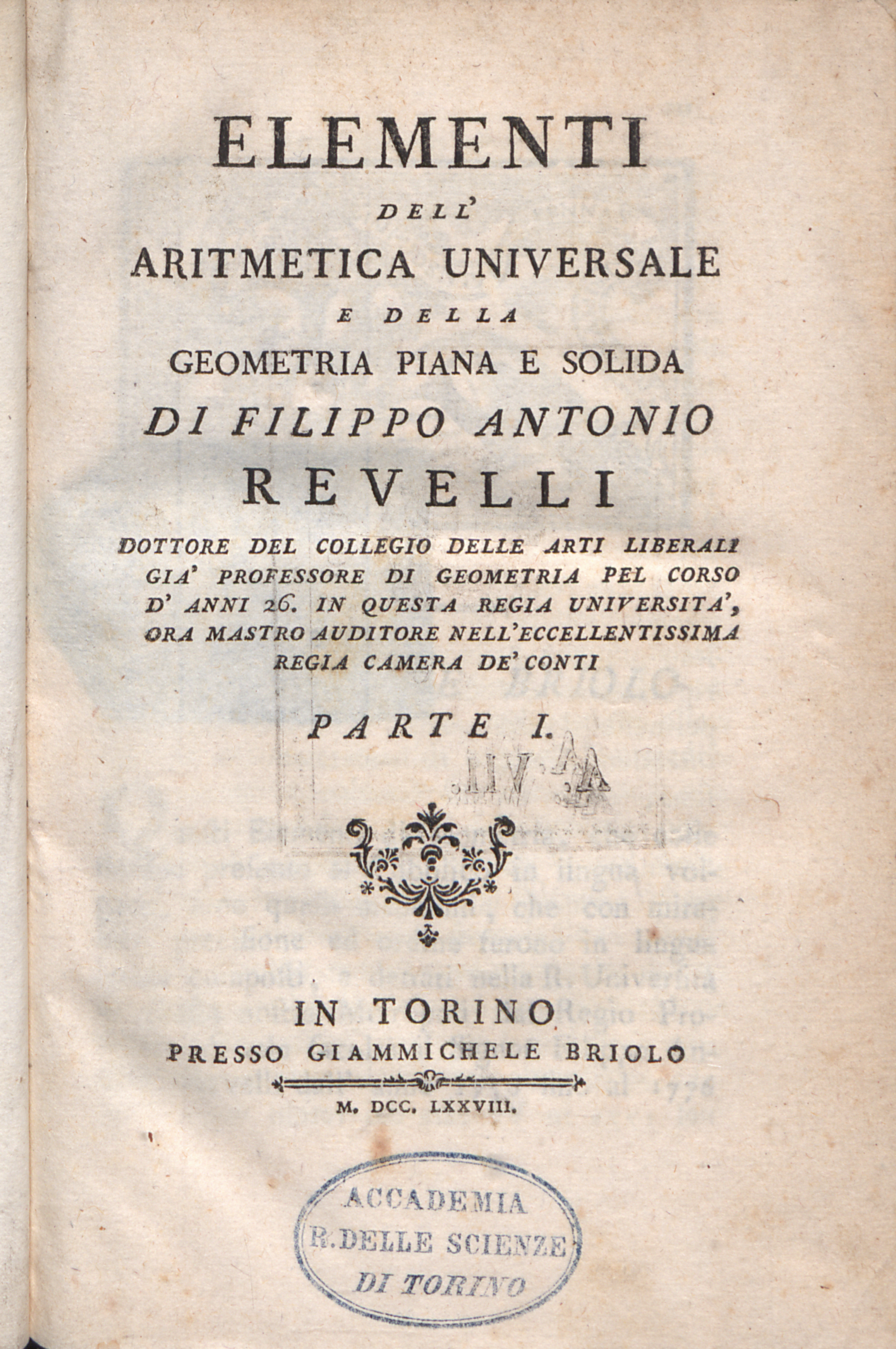
Elementi dell'aritmetica universale e della geometria piana e solida (1778)

Filippo Antonio Revelli (1716 – 1801) was an Italian mathematician.

== Life ==
He was professor of geometry for 26 years at the University of Turin.

He had among his pupils Joseph-Louis Lagrange.

His son Vincenzo Antonio Revelli (1764-1835) was a philosopher and painter.

== Works ==
- Elementi dell'aritmetica universale e della geometria piana e solida (in Italian). Vol. 1. Turin: Giammichele Briolo. 1778.
- Elementi dell'aritmetica universale e della geometria piana e solida (in Italian). Vol. 2. Turin: Giammichele Briolo. 1778.
