= List of Monegasque people by net worth =

This is a list of Monegasque billionaires based on an annual assessment of wealth and assets compiled and published by Forbes magazine in 2023.

== 2023 Monegasque billionaires list ==
National Rank	Name	Citizenship	Net Worth (USD)	Source
1	Stefano Pessina	Monaco	5.3 billion	Drugstore chain
2	David Nahmad	Monaco	4 billion	Art collection
3	Ezra Nahmad	Monaco	3.5 billion	Art

== See also ==
- The World's Billionaires
- List of countries by the number of billionaires
