= Laetitia Mikail =

Monaco lawyer

Laetitia Aida Mikail (born mid-1980s) is a Monégasque lawyer and Director at the Junior Chamber of Economics of Monaco where she is responsible for business network events. As a result of her success, in the autumn of 2017, she was appointed to serve for the next three years on Monaco's Conseil Strategique pour l’Attractivité (Strategic Council for Attractiveness) which is involved in planning the country's future economic development.

== Biography ==
Born in Monaco in the mid-1980s, Laetitia Aida Mikail studied law at Keele University in Staffordshire, England, graduating in 2006. She went on to complete a course in Legal Practice at Oxford University (2006–07). She joined the law firm Moores Rowland in 2014 where she serves mainly foreign clients in matters of tax, trusts and company administration.

In 2017, she has achieved unexpected success as the director responsible for networking events with the Junior Chamber of Economics. In March 2017, she began her assignment by launching a meeting on the art market and auctioning at the Villa Sauber, one of the exhibition venues of the New National Museum of Monaco. It attracted over a hundred enthusiasts in the presence of the Monaco diplomat Henri Fissore and Pierre Médecin, the country's branding expert.
