= Trophée Ville de Monaco =

- Organiser(s): Monégasque Football Federation
- Founded: 1995; 31 years ago
- Region: Monaco
- Current champions: Sûreté Publique (5th title)
- Most championships: Sûreté Publique (5 titles)
- Website: Official Site
- 2022 Trophée Ville de Monaco

The Trophée Ville de Monaco or the City of Monaco Trophy in English, is an association football cup competition held for football clubs in the country of Monaco. It is the second-highest football competition in Monaco, behind the Challenge Prince Rainier III.

== Champions ==
- 1995 – Anciens O.S. Monaco
- 1996 – SBM Administration
- 1997 – Sûreté Publique
- 1998 – Mairie de Monaco
- 1999 – HBS
- 2000 – Crédit Foncier
- 2001 – OSM Monacolor
- 2002 – Ribeiro Frères
- 2003 – Anciens Hôpital
- 2004 – Sofamo Biotherm
- 2005 – Single Buoy Moorins
- 2006 – Mecaplast Group
- 2007 – SMA
- 2008 – Lancaster Group
- 2009 – Sofamo Biotherm
- 2010 – Sûreté Publique
- 2011 – CCF Wolzok
- 2012 – Mairie de Monaco
- 2013 – SMB Slot Machines
- 2014 – Sûreté Publique
- 2015 – Carabiniers du Prince FC
- 2016 – CCF Wolzok
- 2017 – Pompiers Monaco
- 2018 – Centre Rainier III
- 2019 – Sûreté Publique
- 2020 – A.P. Poste M.C.
- 2021 – cancelled due to the COVID-19 pandemic
- 2022 – Sûreté Publique
- 2023 – Casino Monte Carlo
- 2024 –
- 2025 –
- 2026 –

== See also ==
- Challenge Monégasque
