= Café de Paris (Monaco) =

Coffehouse and restaurant

Coordinates: 43.7393°N 7.42729°E

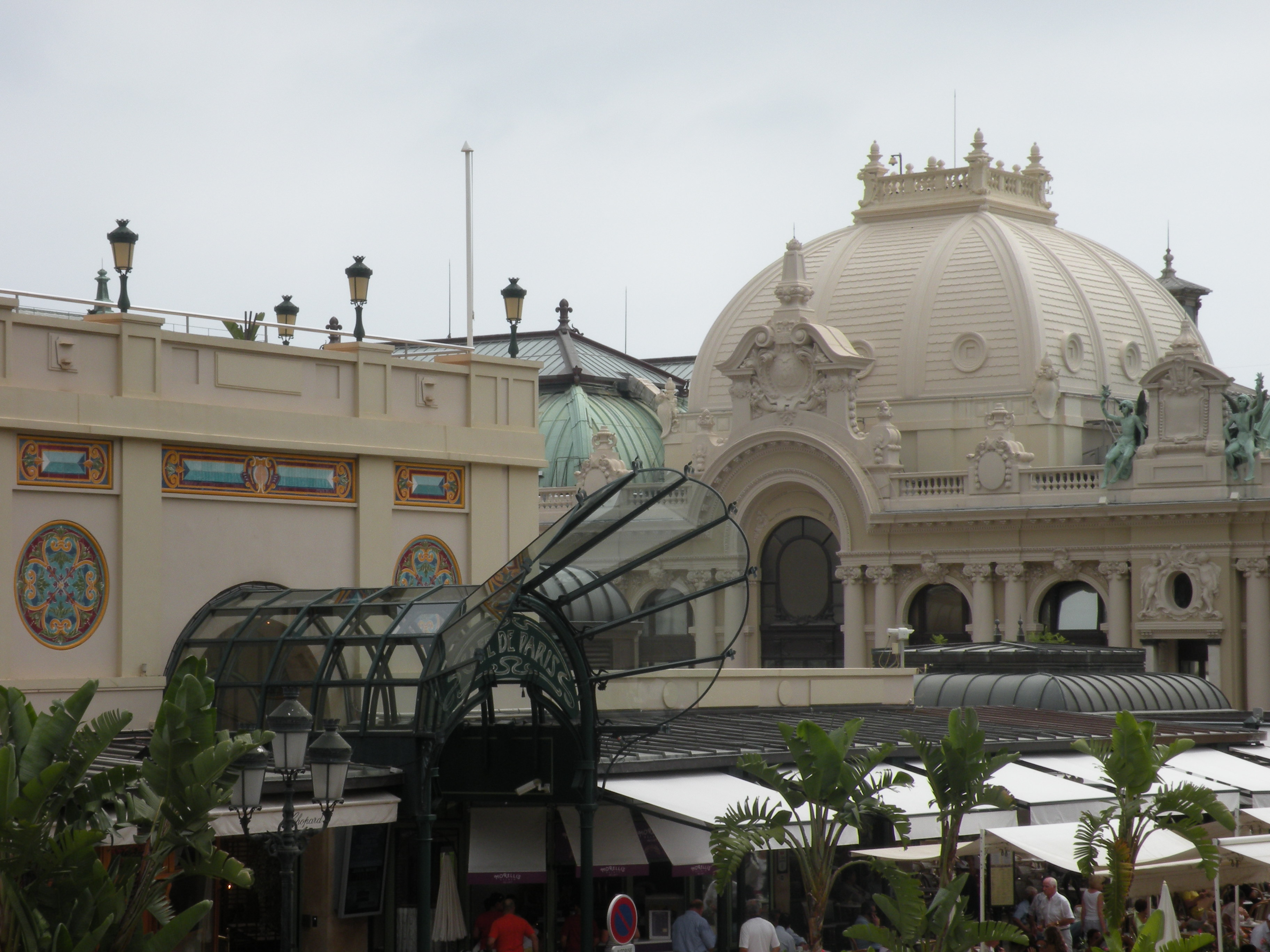
- Industry: Coffeehouse, restaurant
- Founded: 1868
- Headquarters: Monte Carlo, Monaco
- Website: www.montecarlosbm.com/en/restaurant-monaco/the-cafe-de-paris

Café de Paris is a coffeehouse and restaurant in the Belle Époque style of the early 20th century, located in Monte Carlo next to the Casino de Monte-Carlo, on the Place du Casino, Hôtel de Paris. It is owned and managed by the Société des bains de mer de Monaco.

== History ==
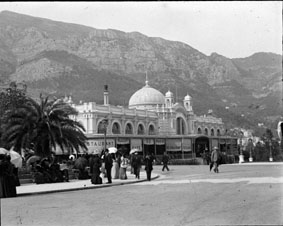
Café de Paris, Monte Carlo, in April 1899

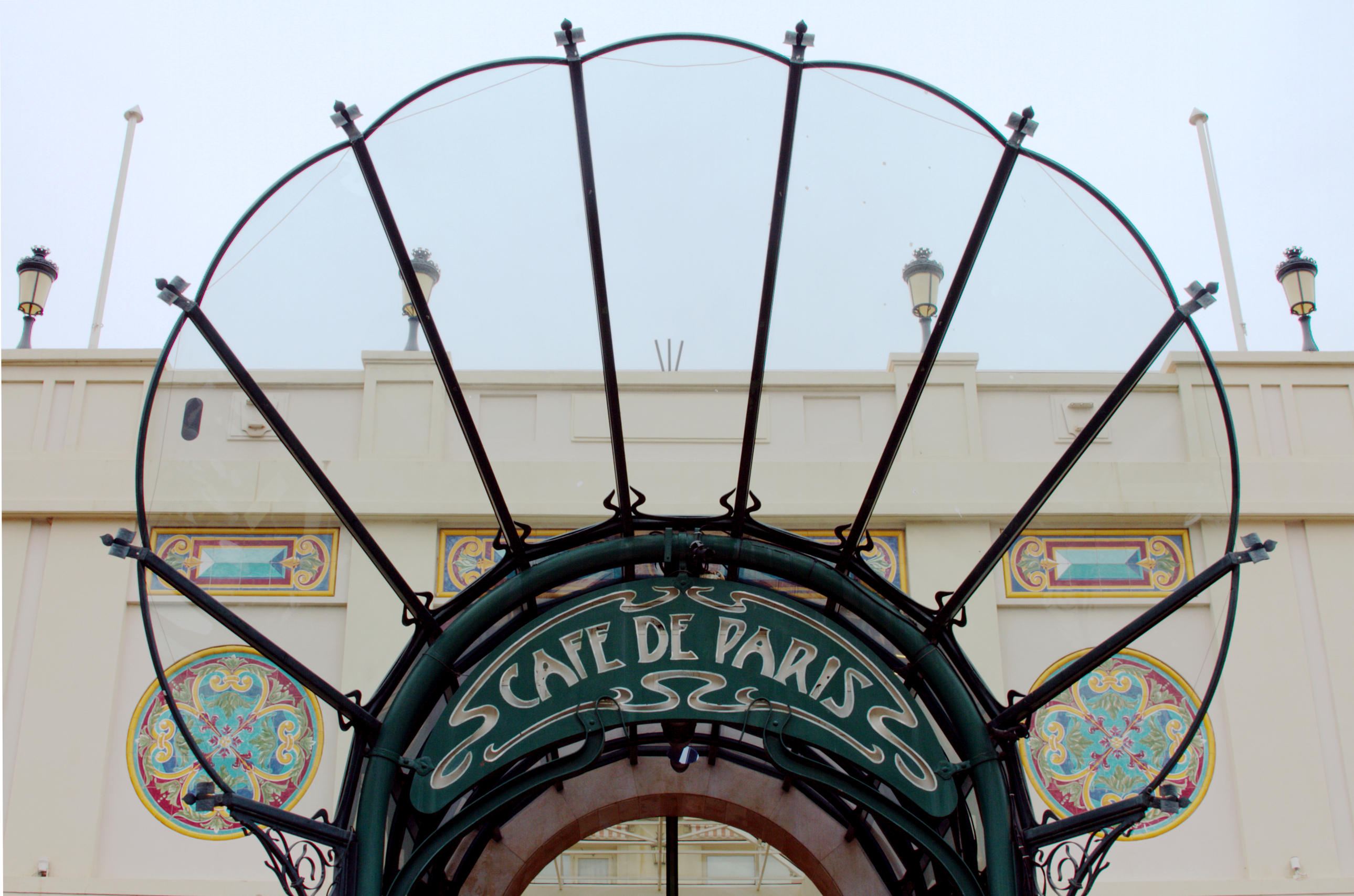
Café de Paris, 2014

Founded in 1868, at the same time as Monte Carlo, with its Casino de Monte-Carlo and the Hôtel de Paris by François Blanc and Prince Charles III of Monaco, it was originally baptized Café Divan. It was transformed several times until the 1930s, then completely renovated in 1988 in the Belle Époque style of the 1900s like the old Parisian bistros.

Café de Paris underwent a 19 month renovation and reopened on 14 November 2023. The renovation cost approximately 55 million euros. In November 2023, Stéphane Tendero became the director of Café de Paris Monte-Carlo, succeeding Éric Gorjux, who had held the position since 2022.

It has large modular terraces with an orchestra and views of the Casino de Monte-Carlo and the Hôtel de Paris and its daily show of prestigious cars, with the Bellevue lounge of 340 m^{2} (3,700 sq ft) on the first floor.

The café is open daily from 8:00 AM to 1:00 AM. Following the latest renovation, its total capacity is up to 500 guests indoors and up to 200 on the terrace.
