= List of football clubs in Monaco =

The following is a list of association football clubs in the Principality of Monaco. As of December 2012, there were 64 clubs registered within Monaco.

== Clubs ==
=== A ===
- A. Personnel Poste Monaco
- Anciens O.S. Monaco
- AS Monaco FC
- AS Poste Monaco
- Association Jeunesse et Sport des Monéghetti
- Association Sportive Du Mentonnais
- AST

=== B ===
- Banque du Gothard
- Banque J. Safra
- BNP Paribas
- BPCA

=== C ===
- Café de Paris
- Caisses Sociales MC
- Carabiniers du Prince
- Carrefour Monaco
- Casino Monte-Carlo
- CCF Cabinet Wolzok
- CFM Monaco
- CMB-SAMIC
- Cogenec CFM
- Crédit Foncier
- CTM

=== D ===
- Décathlon

=== E ===
- Entente Services Public
- Experian Scorex

=== F ===
- Fonction Publique

=== G ===
- GEM Bâtiment
- Grimaldi Forum

=== H ===
- HBS
- Hôpital de Monaco
- HSBC Republic Bank

=== I ===
- IM2S Football Team

=== L ===
- Lancaster Group
- Loews Hotel

=== M ===
- Mairie de Monaco
- Maison d'Arrêt
- Mecaplast Group
- Monaco Logistique
- Monaco Telecom Le Groupe
- Monte-Carlo Country Club

=== O ===
- Office des Téléphones
- OSM Monacolor

=== P ===
- Palais Princier
- Parkings Publics
- Poste

=== R ===
- Radio Monte Carlo
- Ribeiro Freres
- Richelmi

=== S ===
- SAMIC
- SDAU
- SBM Administration
- SBM Loews Jeux
- SBM Jeux
- SBM Slot Machines
- SIAMP CEDAP
- Silvatrim
- Single Buoy Moorings
- Slot San Casiono
- Slots Machines
- SMA
- Sofamo Biotherm
- Sun Casino
- Sapeurs Pompiers Monaco
- SUC
- Sûreté Publique

=== T ===
- Theramex

=== U ===
- UBS Monaco
