= Joël Garault =

French Monaco-based chef (born 1955)

- Born: 1955 (age 70–71); Loudun, Vienne, Poitou-Charentes, France
- Occupation: Chef

Joël Garault (born 1955) is a French-born, Monaco-based Michelin-starred chef.

== Early life ==
Joël Garault was born in Loudun in 1955. He was educated in Tours.

== Career ==
Garault started his career as an assistant to chef Christian Willer in La Baule. He opened his first restaurant in Limoges in 1970. By 1975, he received his first Michelin star as the chef of the restaurant of the Hôtel Martinez in Cannes. He became the chef of La Réserve de Beaulieu & Spa, a five-star hotel in Beaulieu-sur-Mer, in 1988.

Garault became the chef of the Hôtel Mirabeau in Monaco in 1991. He was the chef of Le Vistamar, a primarily pescetarian restaurant at the Hôtel Hermitage Monte-Carlo, for 18 years. The restaurant lost its Michelin star in 2009, but it earned it back in 2011. Meanwhile, Garault was also asked to prepare a dinner for the wedding of Albert II, Prince of Monaco, and Charlene Wittstock in 2011. He retired in April 2016.

Garault is a member of the Compagnons du Tour de France. He became a Knight of the National Order of Merit in 2016.
