= Richard Shepherd (chef) =

British chef and restaurateur (1945–2022)

- Born: Richard Alan Shepherd; 30 April 1945; Weston-super-Mare, Somerset, England
- Died: 23 November 2022 (aged 77)
- Employers: Mount Pleasant Hotel, Great Malvern; Simpson's-in-the-Strand; Savoy Hotel; Grand-Hôtel du Cap-Ferrat; La Réserve de Beaulieu; The Dorchester; Capital Hotel, London; Langan's Brasserie
- Spouse: Christine Van den Bosch
- Children: 2
- Parent(s): Eric Shepherd and Florence, née Sullivan

Richard Alan Shepherd CBE (30 April 1945 – 23 November 2022) was a British chef who won a Michelin star at the Capital Hotel in Knightsbridge – one of the first British chefs to win this accolade. He took charge of Langan's Brasserie and expanded it into a successful group of restaurants. Shepherd was influential in the development of the hospitality profession in the UK and was recognised and honoured as such.

== Early life ==
Richard Alan Shepherd was born in Weston-super-Mare, Somerset on 30 April 1945. He worked in local hotels and restaurants while he was still at school. Having decided at this early age that he could do better than the professionals he'd worked with, he started as a 15-year-old apprentice at the Mount Pleasant Hotel in Great Malvern. He then worked for the Savoy Group, starting as a commis chef at Simpson's-in-the-Strand under Joe Curly and then at the Savoy Grill under chefs Louis Virot and Silvano Trompetto. He then had a spell in France at the Grand-Hôtel du Cap-Ferrat and La Réserve de Beaulieu where he was a chef de partie. Then, back in London, he became a sous chef under Eugene Kauffler at The Dorchester.

In 1971, he became the chef de cuisine at the Capital Hotel. His Provençale style was acclaimed and, in 1974, he was awarded a Michelin star – the first to be won by an Englishman in London.

== Langan's ==
Michael Caine was impressed by Shepherd's work at the Capital and recommended him to Peter Langan who needed someone to rescue his new Langan's Brasserie. Shepherd made a success of the cooking and also kept the place organised despite Langan's notorious antics. After Langan immolated himself, Shepherd managed and expanded the entire business, opening more restaurants. At its peak, the chain had about 15 brasseries including the eponymous Shepherd's, which was popular with politicians in the nearby Palace of Westminster.

At Langan's, Shepherd introduced a new style of menu which was briefer than the extensive à la carte which had been customary in high-class British restaurants. This was based on his experience of working in Provence. Also, he would adjust the positioning and language used to promote particular dishes. The dishes listed last in the starters section or first in the main courses would tend to sell best. And some names worked better in English than French or vice versa. So, for example, Vichyssoise was more successful than "chilled leek soup" but "Provençale fish soup" worked better than "soupe de poisson".

== Professional development and accolades ==
Shepherd was a member of the Club 9 group of chefs which founded the British chapter of the Académie culinaire de France in 1980 and this subsequently became the Royal Academy of Culinary Arts. He worked with the City and Guilds of London Institute and helped establish National Vocational Qualifications for catering and hospitality. He was made an honorary professor at Thames Valley University, a Freeman of the City of London and a Commander of British Empire (CBE) for his services to the hospitality industry.

In 1990, Shepherd was the guest judge in the very first episode of MasterChef along with his partner at Langan's, Michael Caine.
