= Caroli Group =

- Company type: Private
- Industry: Real estate development, communication, media
- Founder: Antonio Caroli
- Headquarters: 27, Boulevard d’Italie, Monaco
- Number of locations: Monaco, France
- Website: caroli-realestate.com

The Caroli Group is a Monegasque company founded in 1978 in Monte Carlo, which has diversified since. It encompasses real estate development, communication and media.

== History ==
The real estate company was founded by the engineer Antonio Caroli in 1978.

=== Real estate development ===
Since its founding in the 1970s, the company has built several residential buildings and luxury hotels in Monaco:

- Le Mirabeau., 1973
- Hôtel Loews, now known as the Fairmont Monte Carlo., 1975
- La Réserve de Beaulieu & Spa in Beaulieu-sur-Mer, just outside Monaco.
- Monte Carlo Palace, 1988.
- Soleil d'Or
- Terrasses du Port

In 2015, the Caroli Group expanded the Antoine 1er dock by developing more buildings for 52 apartments and two museums for Euro 300 million.

=== Communication ===
Its events and communications subsidiary Promocom was founded in 1988. It is chaired by Francesco Caroli, Antonio Caroli's son, who serves as the Chairman of Sycom (syndicat patronal monégasque des professionnels de la communication).

It includes advertising, Sécurité Privée Monaco (private security), digital advertising, and event planning.

=== Media ===
It publishes L'Observateur de Monaco, a monthly magazine, and Monaco Hebdo, a weekly newspaper.
