= List of tallest buildings in Monaco =

The following is a list of the tallest buildings in Monaco.

== Completed ==
Was the tallest building in Monaco upon completion

Rank	Building	Photo	Height (m)	Height (ft)	Floors	Built	Architect	Notes
1	Odeon Tower		170	558	49	2015	Alexandre Giraldi	Tallest building of Monaco
2	Le Millefiori		111	364	37	1969	Jean Ginsberg	
3	L'Annonciade		111	364	35	1980	Jean Notari & José Notari	
4	Parc Saint Roman		108	354	35	1982	Luigi Caccia Dominioni	
5	Columbia Place		105	344	34	1985	Joseph Iori	
6	Château Périgord I		93	305	30	1968	Joseph Fissore	
7	Château Périgord II		93	305	30	1973	Joseph Fissore	
8	Le Roccabella		90	295	29	1982	Gio Ponti, Michel Ravarino	
9	Tour Simona, Le Simona		90	295	23	2012	Suzanne Belaieff, Jean-Pierre Lott	
10	Le Mirabeau		81	266	26	1975	Gabor Acs, Cario Maria Natale, Jean Notari, José Notari	Former luxury hotel. Renovated from 2007 to 2010, and transformed to a residential building
11	Résidences Monte Carlo Sun		81	266	26	1982	Jean Ginsberg, E. Popesco, Louis Rué	
