= List of newspapers in Monaco =

Below is a list of newspapers published in Monaco or with news of Monaco.

- Journal de Monaco, government gazette
- L'Observateur de Monaco, monthly news magazine
- Monaco Hebdo, weekly newspaper
- Monaco-Matin, daily newspaper

== See also ==
- Lists of newspapers
