= Langan's Brasserie =

Restaurant in London, England

Coordinates: 51.50703°N 0.14328°W

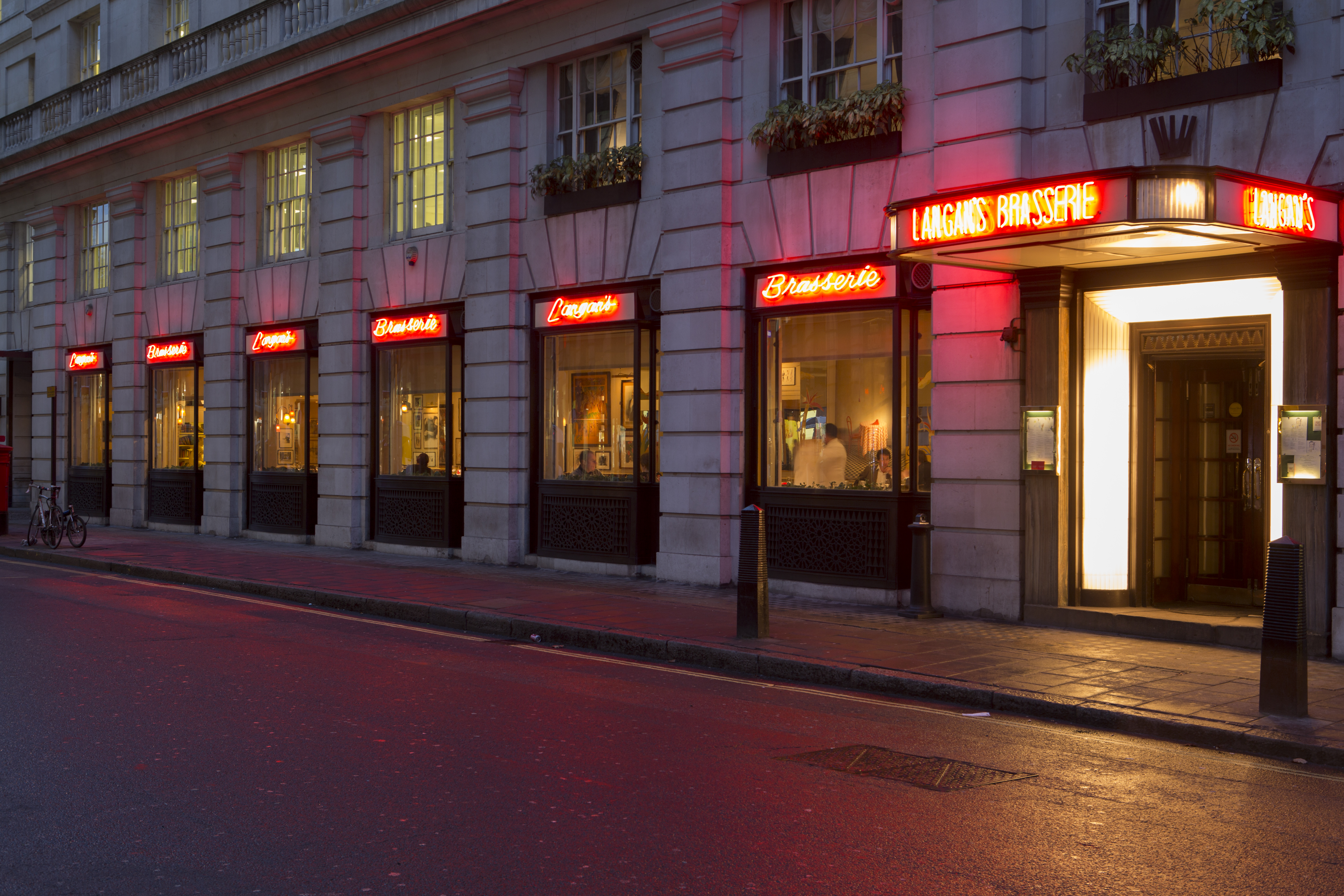
- Interactive map of Langan's Brasserie

Restaurant information
- Established: 1976
- Location: Stratton St,, Westminster, London, W1J 8LB, United Kingdom
- Website: www.langansbrasserie.com

Langan's Brasserie is a restaurant situated on Stratton Street in Mayfair, London. Opened by the Irish entrepreneur Peter Langan on 20 October 1976 in partnership with the actor Michael Caine, the Brasserie (which had previously housed the ornate restaurant Le Coq d'Or) quickly attracted celebrities and became hugely successful. Langan's Brasserie remains one of the most popular restaurants in London today.

== History ==
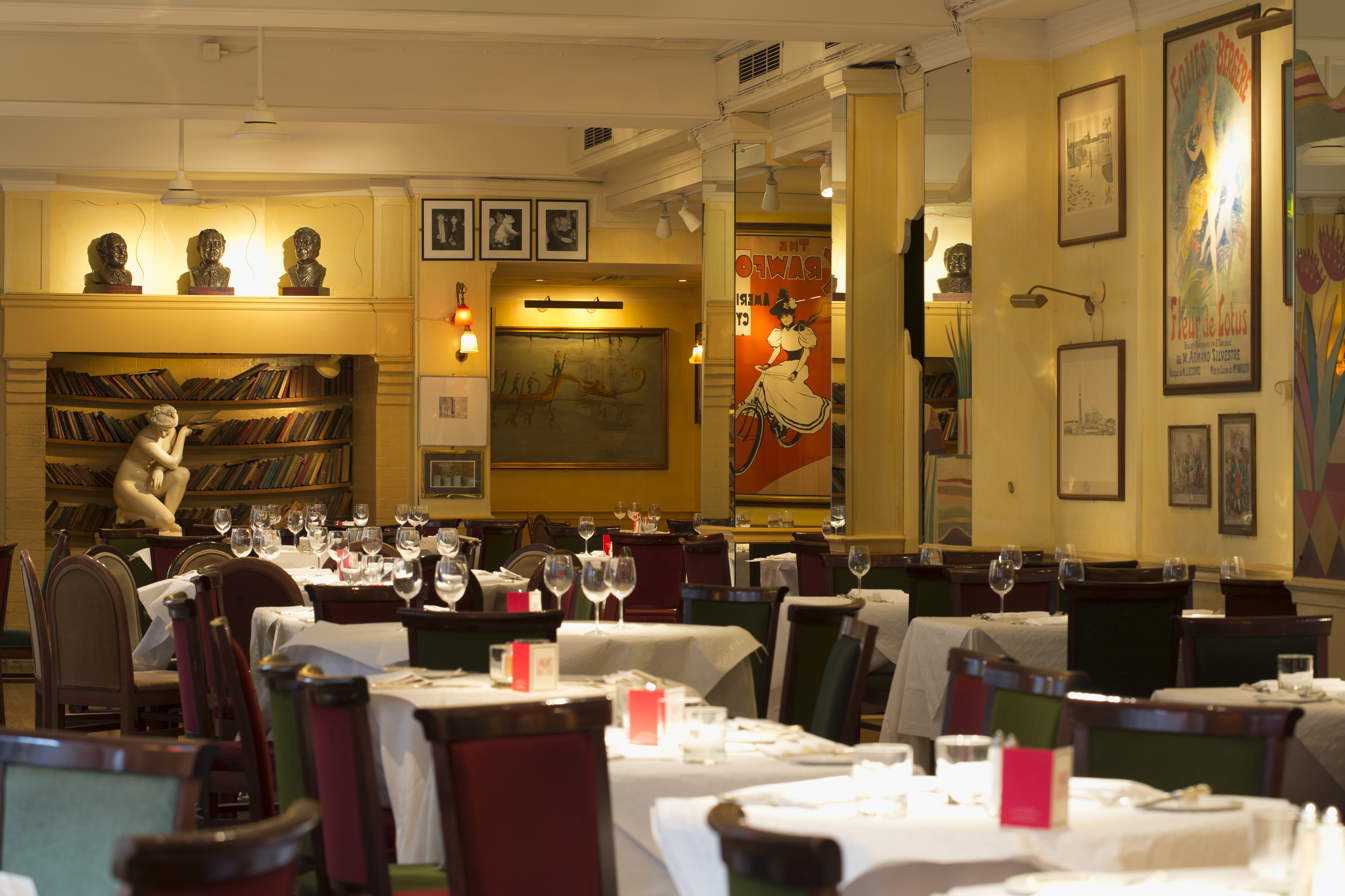
Langan's Brasserie interior

Peter Langan (who gave his name to the Brasserie) was born in Ireland in 1941. After moving to England in the early 1960s, Langan began his catering career working at Odin's restaurant at 27 Devonshire Street. Langan had been lodging nearby to Odin's and when the proprietor, James Benson, was killed in an accident in 1966, he took over the kitchen for Benson's wife, Kirsten. Langan transformed Odin's in both its style of cuisine and its decor. Patrick Procktor, an artist who lived near and later married Kirsten Benson, provided a number of watercolours to hang on the walls of Odin's alongside the works of other artists encouraged to 'eat down' their work. After purchasing Benson's share of Odin's, Langan created a larger Odin's at the premises next door in Devonshire Street. Opening early in 1973, the larger Odin's maintained the tradition of serving hearty cuisine in an environment surrounded by original artworks. Odin's quickly became a very popular dining location and proved profitable enough to permit Langan to embark on what became his most successful venture, Langan's Brasserie.

Peter Langan wanted to bring Parisienne cafe society to London and chose the former site of Le Coq d'Or restaurant in Stratton Street, Mayfair as its location. Michael Caine, a customer and friend of Peter Langan, became his business partner and the pair transformed the site with original artwork, brighter lighting with mismatched lamps and relaxed the atmosphere of the restaurant (there was no dress code for diners). Richard Shepherd, the former head chef at the Michelin-starred Capital Hotel in London, joined the Caine and Langan partnership in 1977 and introduced a menu that has changed little since. By the mid-1980s, Langan's had become London's most-fashionable haunt for stars as diverse as Elizabeth Taylor, Marlon Brando, Mick Jagger, Francis Bacon, Muhammad Ali, Billy Connolly, Ronnie Corbett, Sally Thomsett, Warren Beatty, Jack Nicholson, and David Hockney. The restaurateur Chris Corbin was an early manager of the Brasserie.

A notorious alcoholic, Peter Langan died at the age of 47 on 7 December 1988, several weeks after a fire at his home in Essex which he is alleged to have started himself. Langan's name was retained by the restaurant and Richard Shepherd subsequently bought Caine's share of the company to become the sole owner of Langan's Brasserie and the group's other restaurants.

Langan's Brasserie is particularly noted for its artwork. Its walls are adorned with works by artists, including David Hockney (who also designed the menu), Lucian Freud, Francis Bacon, Timmy Mallett, Gerald Moira and Patrick Procktor. Upstairs at the Brasserie, is a room known as 'The Venetian Room' which features murals by Patrick Procktor specially commissioned by Peter Langan.

== Other Langan's restaurants ==
The Langan's brand has been expanded to include: Odin's Bar & Bistro (a restaurant acquired by Langan in 1967) which are next door to each other in Devonshire Street in Marylebone but closed in March 2013 and Shepherd's Bar & Bistro in Marsham Court, Westminster, which was opened in 1993. He also collaborated with Karen Jones and Roger Myers who 'did' three restaurants with Langan, each called Langan's Bar and Grill, in the city, Mayfair and Hampton Court. Two years later they sold Theme Holdings.

Previously, the Langan's chain had included another Langan's Bistro in Paston Place, Brighton, but this has since closed. Another Langan's Brasserie was opened in 1986 by Peter Langan in Coggeshall, Essex, near his home. After Langan's death in 1988, the Head Chef of the restaurant, Mark Baumann adopted the restaurant.

In July 1998, Richard Shepherd opened Langan's Coq d'Or on Old Brompton Road in Earls Court, which is now operating as Rocca restaurant.. Shepherd died on 23 November 2022, at the age of 77. Langan's restaurant in New York City is an unrelated business.

== Upstairs at Langan's ==
Upstairs at Langan's is an invitation-only private member's club in Mayfair, London, situated above the Langan's Brasserie.

Upstairs at Langan's
- Formation: 2021/22
- Type: Private members' club
- Location: Stratton Street, Mayfair, London, England
- Website: www.langansbrasserie.com/upstairs/

=== Facilities ===
Upstairs has two cocktail bars, an outdoor cigar terrace, a dance floor and DJ booth. The club has a license to remain open until 3am.

Upstairs at Langan's frequently hosts live entertainment including bands and international DJs. The club also hosts exclusive events.

=== Interior Design and decor ===
Taking inspiration from Studio 54, Upstairs is noted for its 70s retro-glam style, crimson mirrored interior and velvet decor. Inside consists of a bespoke bar made from ceramic spheres and covered in red marble.

=== Dress Code ===
The club enforces a smart Dress code that encourages "style" and "flair".

Upstairs at Langan's has seen celebrities such as Rita Ora.
