= David Guez (artist) =

Israeli abstract painter

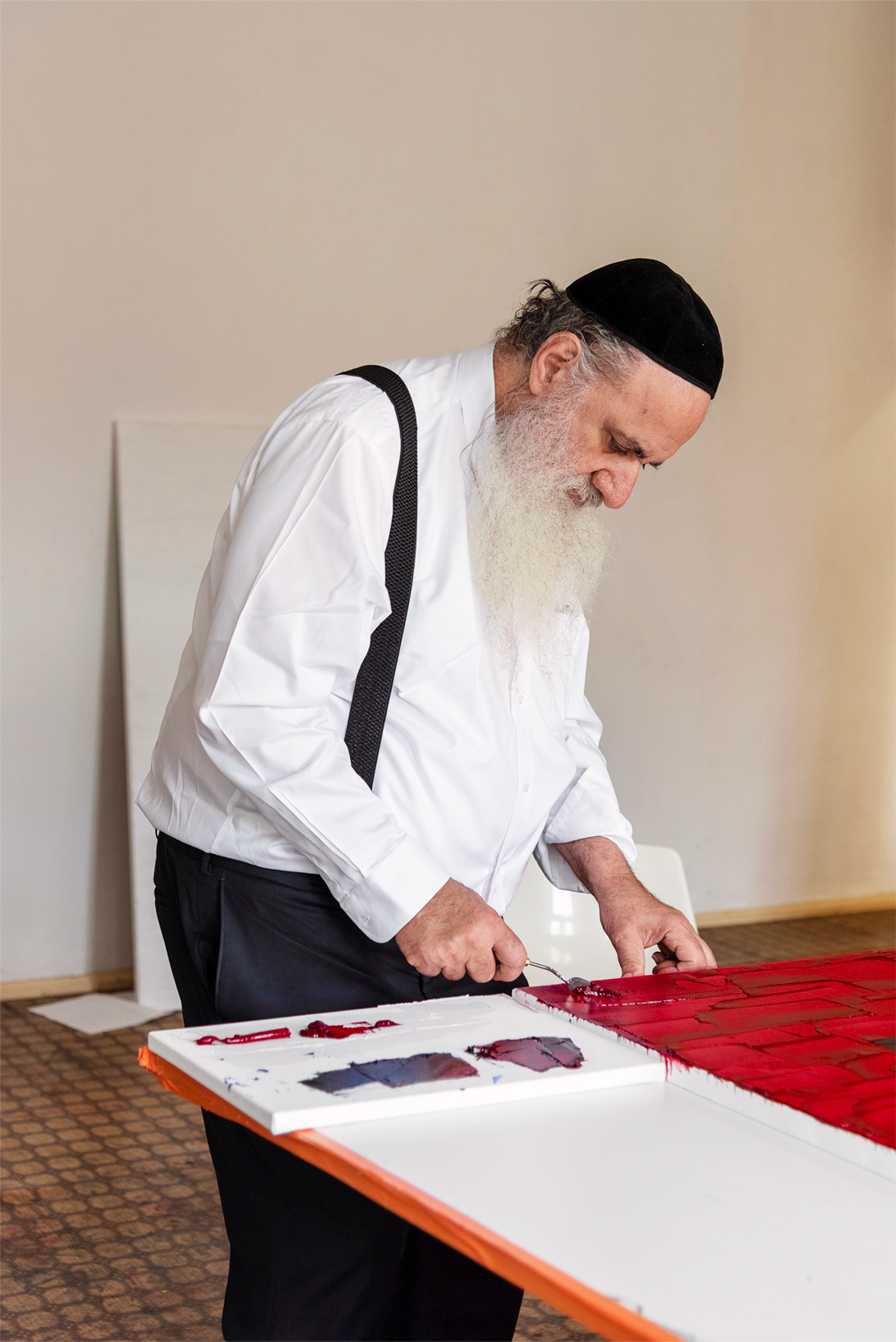
- The Artist David Guez in his studio at the Rothko Museum, Latvia, 2025
- Born: 1954 (age 71–72); Tunis, Tunisia
- Movement: Abstract art, Gestural abstraction, Art Informel

David Guez (born 1954) is an Israeli abstract painter based in Jerusalem. His work is associated with gestural abstraction and postwar traditions of Art Informel. He has exhibited internationally, including participation in collateral events of the Venice Biennale and the Mark Rothko International Painting Symposium.

== Early life ==
David Guez was born in 1954 in Tunis, Tunisia. He lived in Paris and Los Angeles before settling in Jerusalem, where he works as a painter primarily in oil on canvas.

== Career ==
Guez primarily works in oil on canvas, producing abstract compositions characterized by gestural spatula work, thick impasto, and layered surfaces. His work emphasizes process, movement, and materiality over representational form. He is a member of the America–Israel Cultural Foundation in the visual arts category and is listed in The Painting Center’s Art File, an online database of the New York–based nonprofit gallery.

In 2022, Guez participated in Personal Structures: Reflections, an exhibition organized by the European Cultural Centre at Palazzo Bembo in Venice during the 59th Venice Biennale.

His ongoing Spiritual Landscape series explores inner terrains through abstraction, often using restrained palettes including black, gold, white, and deep blues. Solo exhibitions of this series have been held at the Fairmont Monte Carlo (2023), D&M Art Gallery, Tel Aviv (2023–2024), Art & Décoration Art Fair with JD ART Gallery, Saint-Tropez (2024), and The Hub Gallery, Neve Tzedek, Tel Aviv (2025).

In 2024, Guez exhibited in Blue Horizons: An Astral Journey into the Economy of the Future at the Naval Museum and Planetarium in Imperia, Italy. In 2025, he took part in Contemporary Landscape 2025, a group exhibition at the CICA Museum in South Korea. Later that year, he was selected for the Mark Rothko International Painting Symposium at the Rothko Museum (formerly Mark Rothko Art Center) in Daugavpils, Latvia. Paintings produced during the symposium, including Mark and Moody Blues, were added to the museum’s permanent collection.

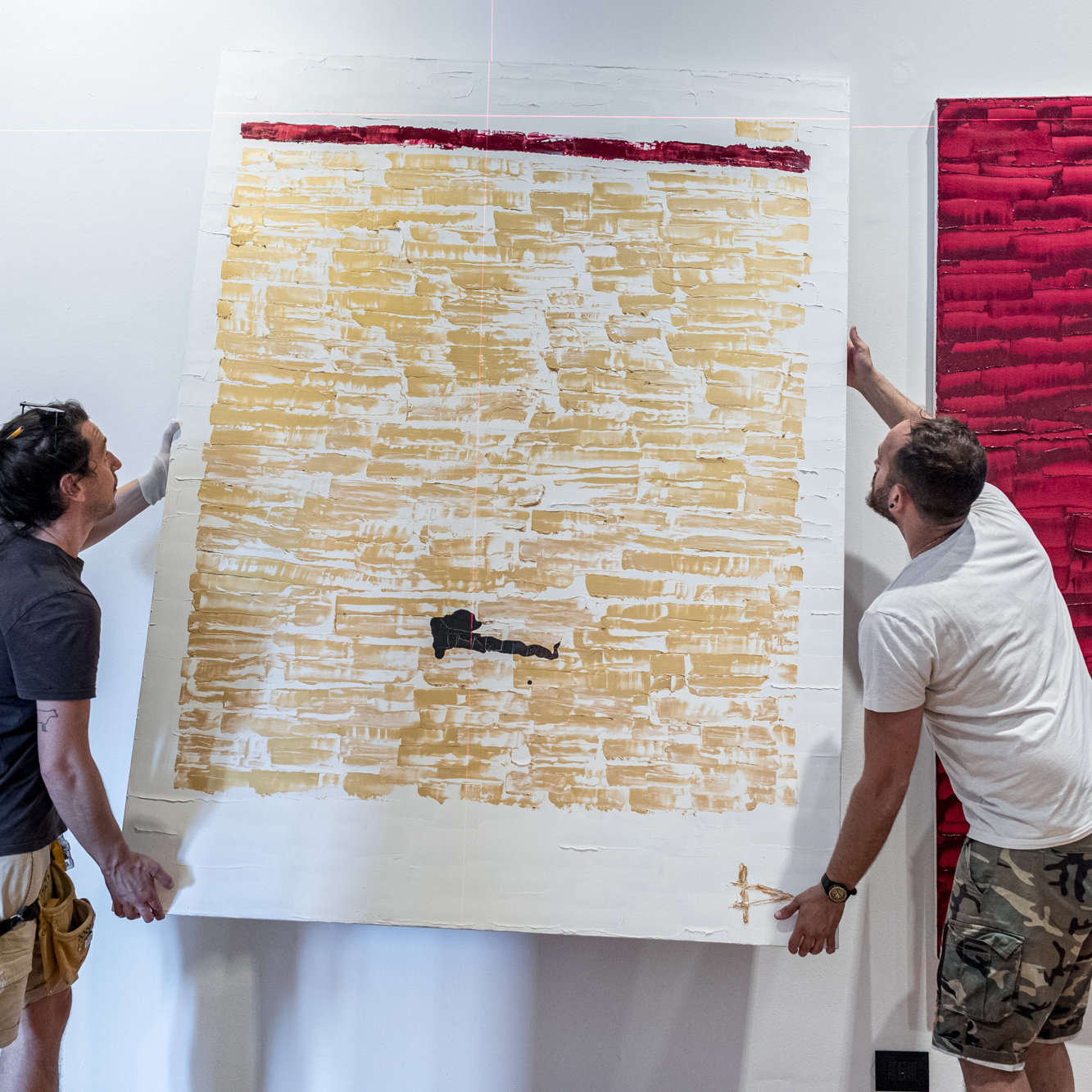
Painting by David Guez being installed at the Palazzo Bembo in Venice, as part of the Personal Structures group exhibition, 2022

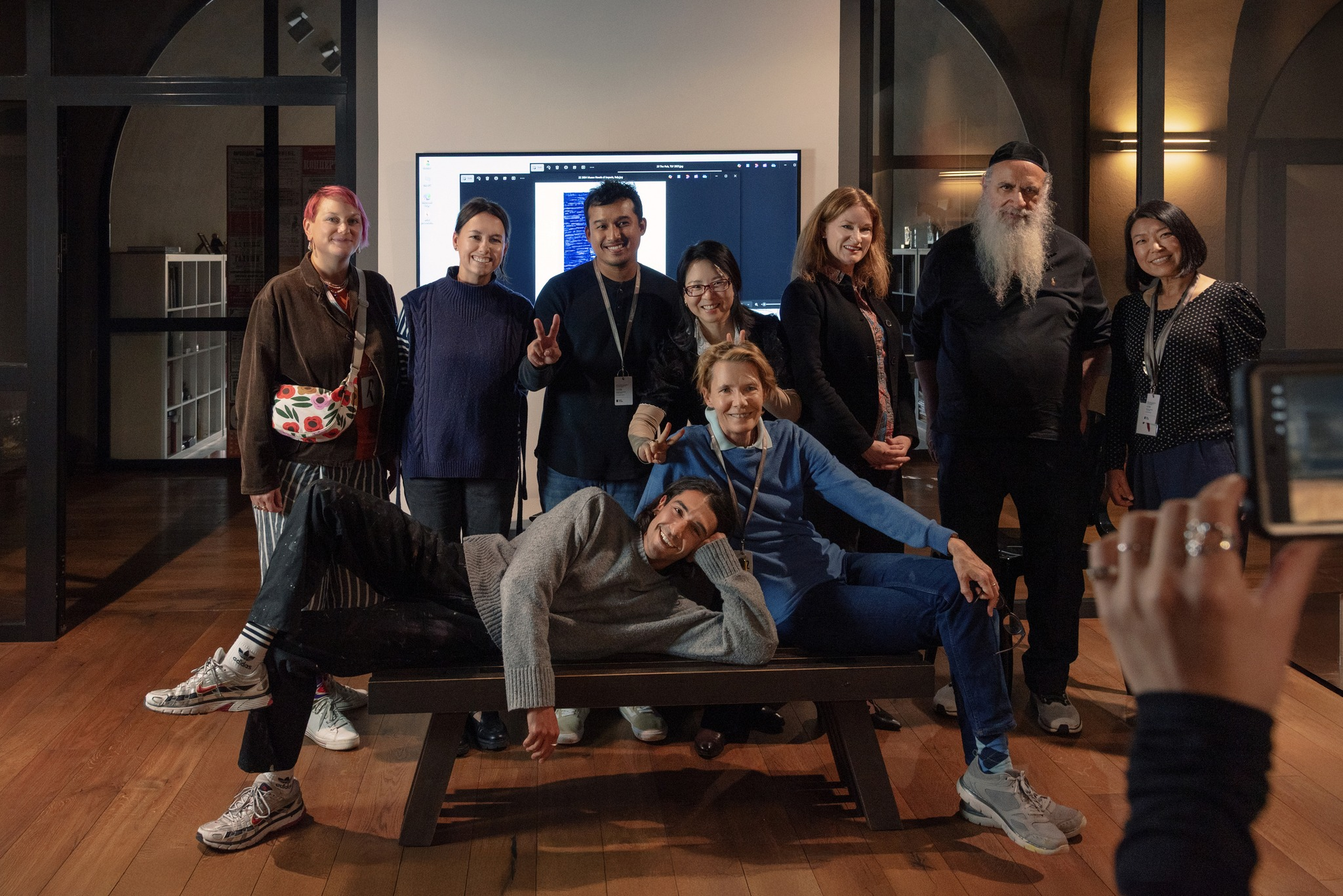
David Guez alongside his fellow artists participating in the Rothko 2025 International Painting Symposium at the Rothko Museum, Latvia

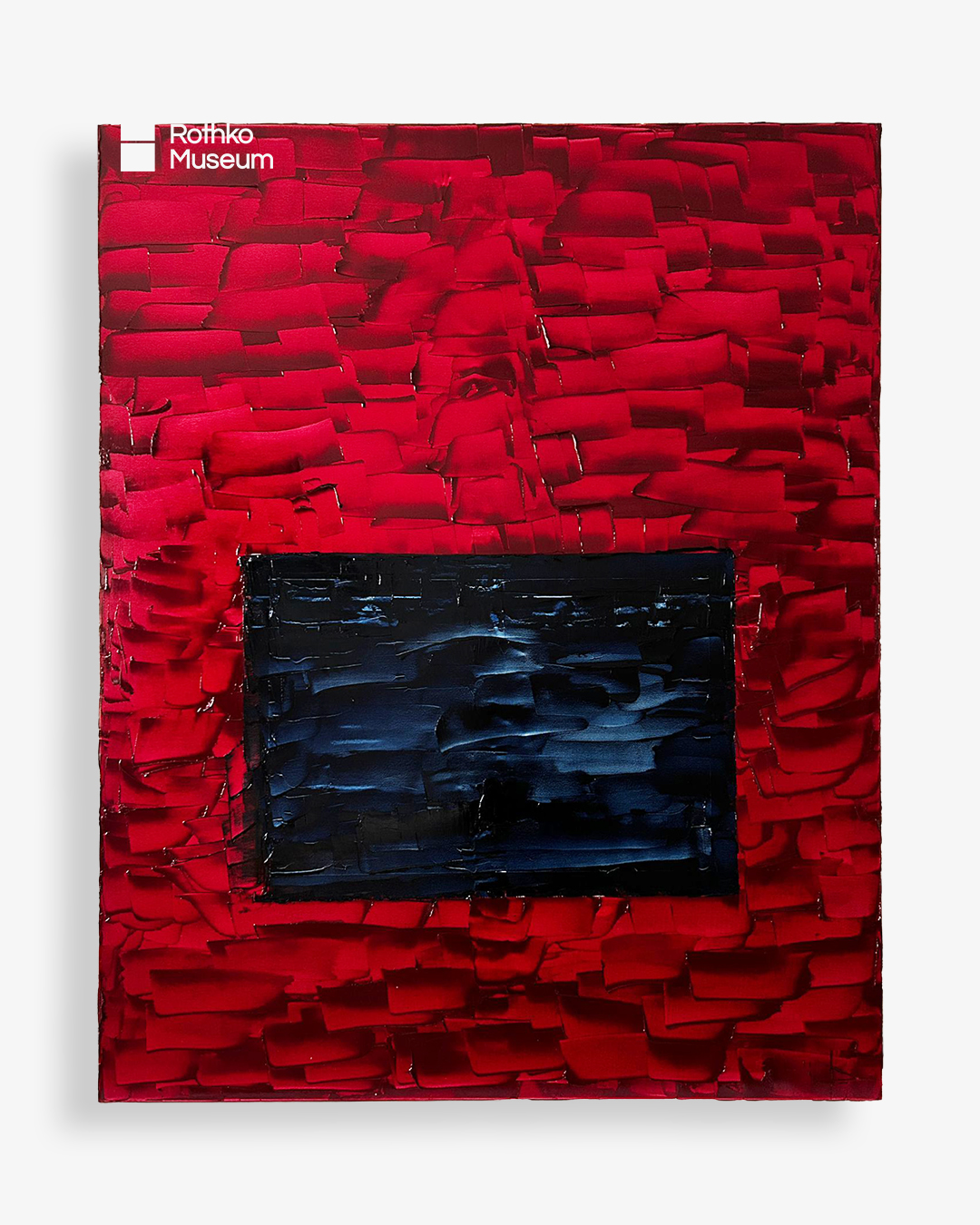
David Guez, Mark, oil on canvas, 150 × 120 cm, 2025

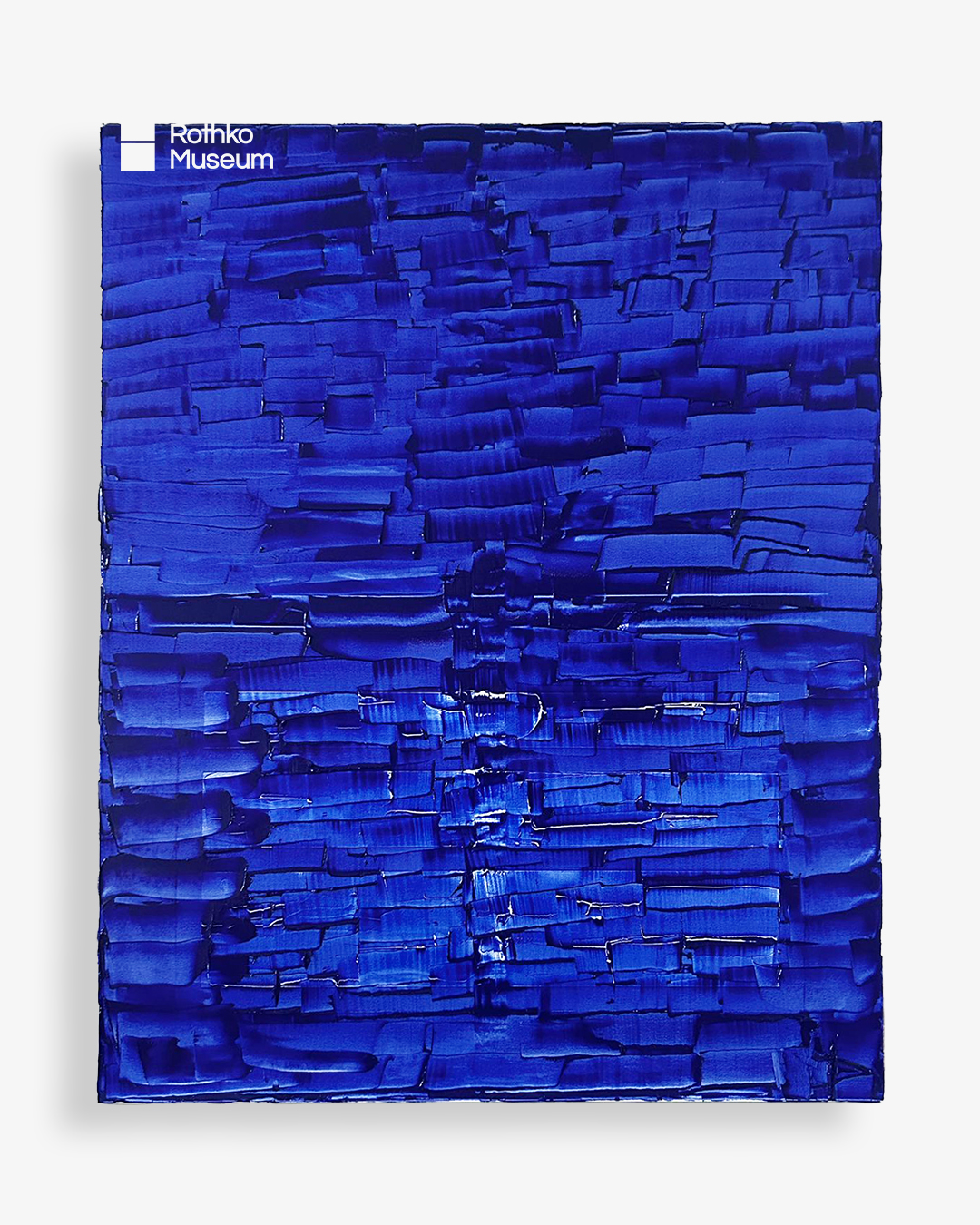
David Guez, Moody Blues, oil on canvas, 150 × 120 cm, 2025

== Work and style ==
Guez creates large-scale abstract paintings with pronounced, rhythmic marks and thick impasto, resulting in tactile, textured surfaces. His Spiritual Landscape series uses rich palettes and contrasts dense areas with lighter sections. His work follows traditions of gestural abstraction and Art Informel, prioritizing materiality and rhythm over representation.

His ongoing Spiritual Landscape series explores inner terrains through abstraction, often using restrained palettes including black, gold, white, and deep blues. Solo exhibitions of this series have been held at the Fairmont Monte Carlo (2023), D&M Art Gallery, Tel Aviv (2023–2024), Art & Décoration Art Fair with JD ART Gallery, Saint-Tropez (2024), and The Hub Gallery, Neve Tzedek, Tel Aviv (2025).

== Critical reception ==
Italian art critic Paolo Levi discussed Guez’s work in a 2022 exhibition catalog, noting connections to Mark Rothko and describing him as “an artist who picked up where Rothko didn’t finish”. In 2025, Artnet profiled Guez in an interview focused on his process and relationship to abstraction, framing his approach as rooted in intuition and physical gesture.

== Selected exhibitions ==
- 2022: Personal Structures: Reflections, Palazzo Bembo, Venice, Italy
- 2022: Rhythm Unseen, D&M Art Gallery, Tel Aviv, Israel
- 2023: Spiritual Landscape (solo), Fairmont Monte Carlo, Monaco
- 2023–2024: Spiritual Landscape (solo), D&M Art Gallery, Tel Aviv, Israel
- 2024: Mirrors of the Self: Exploring Personal Identity, Galleria Cael, Milan, Italy
- 2024: Blue Horizons: An Astral Journey into the Economy of the Future, Naval Museum and Planetarium, Imperia, Italy
- 2025: Contemporary Landscape 2025, CICA Museum, Gimpo, South Korea
- 2025: Mark Rothko International Painting Symposium, Rothko Museum, Daugavpils, Latvia
