= Katara Towers =

Hotel in Lusail, Qatar

Coordinates: 25°23′21.6″N 51°31′53.3″E

- أبراج كتارا
- The Katara Towers in 2023
- Interactive map of the Katara Towers area
- Alternative names: Katara Hospitality Tower, Crescent Tower Lusail

General information
- Status: Completed
- Type: Hotel
- Location: Lusail Marina Promenade; Lusail, Qatar
- Construction started: 2014
- Completed: 2022
- Cost: (US$600 million)
- Owner: Sheikh Ali bin Ahmed Al Kuwari
- Operator: Katara Hospitality

Height
- Architectural: 211 m (692.3 ft)

Technical details
- Material: Concrete / Steel / Glass
- Floor count: 40
- Floor area: 300,000 m^{2} (3,229,200 sq ft)
- Lifts/elevators: 67

Design and construction
- Architect: Dar Al-Handasah
- Architecture firm: Kling Consult International
- Structural engineer: HBK Contracting Co. WLL
- Main contractor: Hamad Bin Khalid Contracting Company

Website
- www.katarahospitality.com

Katara Towers (Arabic: أبراج كتارا), also referred to as Crescent Tower Lusail and Katara Twin Towers or Katara Hospitality Tower, is a high-rise tower located in Lusail, Qatar. The two five-star hotels in the Katara Towers were opened in 2022 when Qatar hosted the 2022 FIFA World Cup. The Katara Towers cover a total area of approximately 300,000 m^{2} (3,229,200 sq ft), offering a range of entertainment and recreational facilities, specialty boutiques, movie theaters, and restaurants. Katara Towers hosts two luxury hotels. One tower houses the Raffles Doha Hotel, while the other contains the Fairmont Doha Hotel. Raffles Hotels & Resorts and Fairmont Hotels & Resorts are both brands of Accor, and the hotels are jointly managed under one management team. The Katara Towers, iconic towers that form two crossed scimitars traditional swords of this Middle East region, with seven or more restaurants offering a diverse range of cuisines.

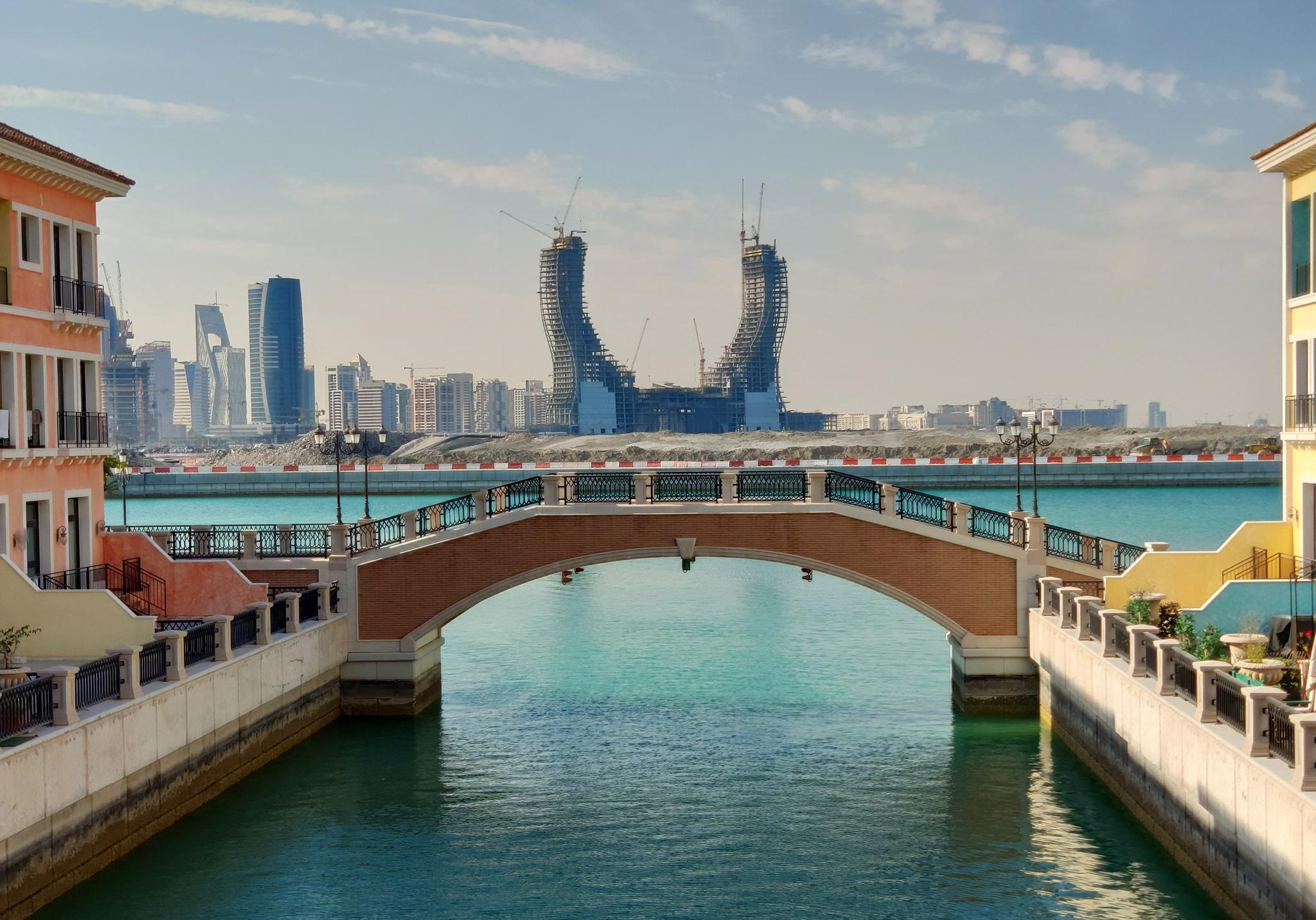
Katara Towers under construction

== See also ==
- Lusail
- Katara Hospitality
