= Toufic Aboukhater =

Palestinian-Lebanese billionaire businessman (1934–2020)

- Born: Toufic Mosleh Aboukhater; 9 December 1934; Tiberias, British Mandate of Palestine (now Israel)
- Died: 6 August 2020 (aged 85); Bluffton, South Carolina, US
- Occupation: Businessman
- Known for: owner of seven InterContinental hotels
- Children: 4

Toufic Aboukhater (1934-2020) was a Monaco-based Palestinian billionaire businessman.

== Early life ==
Aboukhater was born to Palestinian parents in the city of Tiberias, his father was a hotel owner in Tiberias. In 1948 the family moved to Syria then to Lebanon where Toufic completed his education and moved to UAE to work with Royal Dutch Shell, later he became a special economic adviser for the ruler of Ras al Khaima Sheikh Saqr al Qasimi.

== Career ==
In 1998, Aboukhater bought the Loews Hotel Monte-Carlo from Loews Hotels Holding Corporation for an undisclosed price and renamed it the Monte Carlo Grand Hotel. In 2004 the hotel was acquired by hotel chain Fairmont Hotels and Resorts for Euro 215 million, and it is now the Fairmont Monte Carlo.

In April 2011, Aboukhater bought seven InterContinental hotels, including the InterContinental Carlton Cannes Hotel and the InterContinental Amstel Amsterdam for a reported $643 million.

In 2014, he had a net worth of $5.6 billion.

== Personal life ==
He was married and had four sons, Kamal Aboukhater, Bassam Aboukhater, Ghassan Aboukhater, and Houssam Aboukhater. Therese Aboukhater was the mother of his children .

Aboukhater died at his home in Bluffton, South Carolina, US on 6 August 2020.
