= The Capital Restaurant =

Coordinates: 51.5000°N 0.1616°W

- Interactive map of The Capital Restaurant

Restaurant information
- Established: 1971; 55 years ago
- Location: London, England

The Capital Restaurant was a restaurant located in the Capital Hotel in Knightsbridge, London, England. The restaurant was established in 1971 and earned a star from the Michelin Guide under chefs Richard Shepherd and Brian Turner. Other notable chefs who have worked there include Gary Rhodes and Paul Merrett.

Eric Chavot took over as executive chef in 1999; the restaurant earned a two-star rating from Michelin in 2001, and for most of the decade it was ranked by many among Britain's leading restaurants.

Following the departure of Executive Chef Eric Chavot in 2009 the restaurant lost both stars. By 2013, it had been replaced by a new restaurant, Outlaw's at The Capital, named for its chef, Nathan Outlaw. Outlaw's at The Capital had one Michelin Star, but lost it in 2019.
