= Monaco-Matin =

Monegasque daily newspaper

- Type: Daily newspaper
- Owner: Xavier Niel through NJJ Holding
- Publisher: Groupe Nice-Matin
- Founded: December 1997; 28 years ago
- Language: French
- Sister newspapers: Nice-Matin; Var-Matin
- Website: monacomatin.mc

Monaco-Matin (French pronunciation: [mɔnako matɛ̃]) is a Monegasque daily newspaper established in 1997.

== History ==
Originally published as a special edition of Nice-Matin, Monaco-Matin was established as an independent newspaper through an agreement between Gérard Bavastro, president of Nice-Matin, and Michel Lévêque, Monaco's Minister of State, on 17 December 1997; its first issue was published on 31 December 1997.

Monaco-Matin and its sister newspapers, Nice-Matin and Var-Matin, are published by Groupe Nice-Matin. In August 2007, Groupe Hersant Média acquired the group. However, following financial difficulties, the group was sold to an employee cooperative (SCIC) in November 2014. In February 2020, Xavier Niel acquired 100% of the group via his NJJ Holding company.

== See also ==
- List of newspapers in Monaco
