= Mayfair Place =

Street in the City of Westminster, London

Coordinates: 51°30′26.72″N 0°8′35.01″W

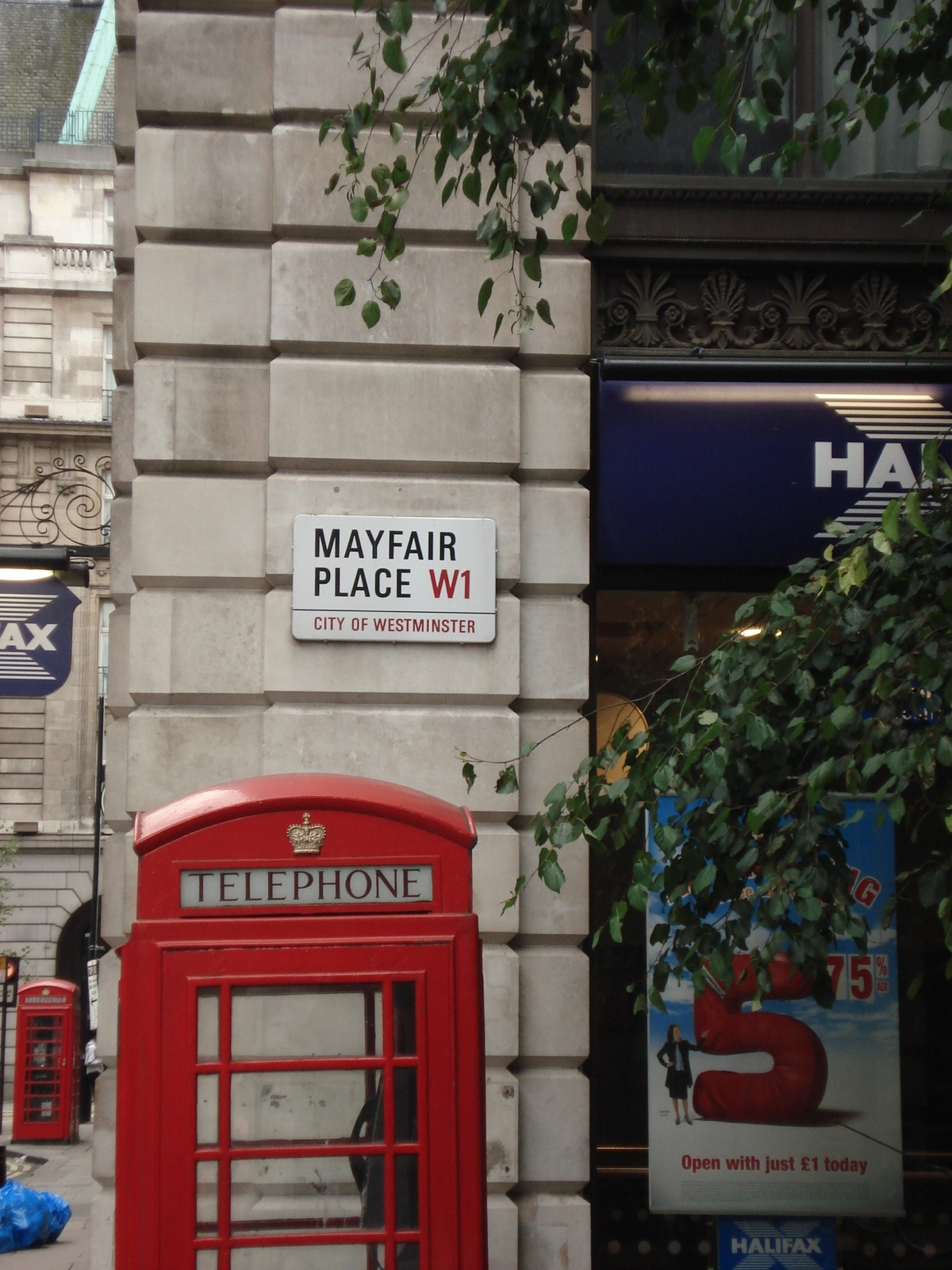
Phonebox on Mayfair Place

Mayfair Place is a street in the City of Westminster, London. The street joins Stratton Street to Berkeley Street.

== History ==
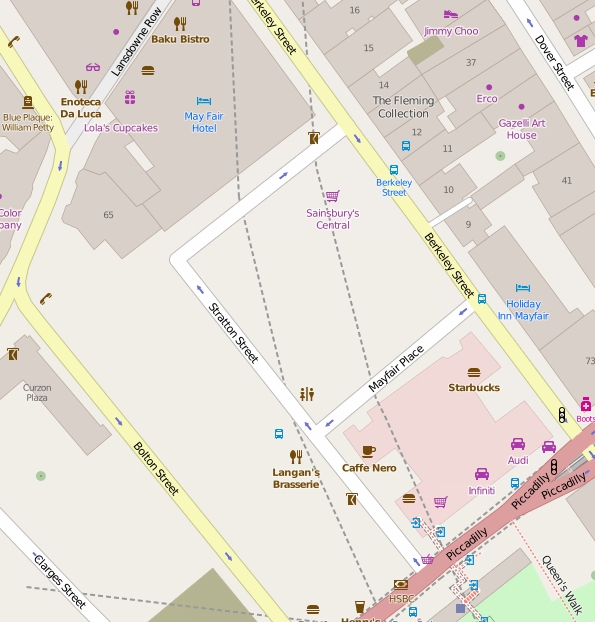
The immediate vicinity of Mayfair Place

Mayfair Place was built in 1924, following the demolition of the original Devonshire House in that year. The new Devonshire House, which completely takes up the south side of Mayfair Place, is a grade II listed building with Historic England.
