= Katara Hospitality =

Qatari state-owned hospitality chain

- Company type: State-owned enterprise
- Industry: Hospitality
- Predecessor: Qatar National Hotels
- Founded: 1970 (as Qatar National Hotels Limited); 1993 (as Qatar National Hotels Company); 2012 (as Katara Hospitality)
- Headquarters: Doha, Qatar
- Key people: His Excellency Mr. Mohammed Saif Al-Sowaidi (chairman); Fahad Abdulla Al Mana (CEO)
- Owner: Qatar Investment Authority
- Subsidiaries: Qetaifan Projects; Murwab Hotels Group; BÜRGENSTOCK Collection; Parisa Restaurants
- Website: katarahospitality.com

Katara Hospitality, formerly known as Qatar National Hotels Company, is the largest hotel owner, developer and operator in Qatar. It is government-owned. As of 2016, the company owns properties in Qatar, Egypt, Morocco, the United Kingdom, France, Italy, Singapore, the Netherlands, the United States, Switzerland, Spain and Thailand. The company had a portfolio of 40 hotels in mid-2019.

== History ==
The company was originally formed in 1970 as Qatar National Hotels Limited (QNH). In 1973, Marriott Hotel, then known as Gulf Hotel and owned by QNH, became the country's five-star hotel. In 1993, this company was replaced by Qatar National Hotels Company. In 2012, it was rebranded under its current form, Katara Hospitality. 'Katara' derives its name from the common spelling used for 'Qatar' by ancient cartographers.

World Travel Awards named Katara Hospitality as the "World's Leading Hospitality Company" in 2013, 2014 and 2015.

== Activities ==
Several Qatar-based hotels are owned by the company, and there are many projects currently in construction. Hotels operating in Qatar include Al Messila, a Luxury Collection Resort & Spa, Doha, Mövenpick Hotel Doha, Sealine Beach, a Murwab Resort, Sharq Village & Spa, Sheraton Grand Doha Resort & Convention Hotel, Simaisma, a Murwab Resort, Somerset West Bay Doha, The Avenue, a Murwab Hotel and The Ritz-Carlton, Doha.

Katara Hospitality opened Sheraton Doha Resort & Convention Hotel in 1982. In a partnership with the premier Spanish football division, La Liga, Katara Hospitality launched the first-ever "La Liga Lounge" at the Sheraton Resort in Doha in March 2017.

=== Properties ===
In 2012, Katara had a portfolio of 24 hotels. By mid-2017, the company had increased its portfolio to 40 hotels.

- Qatar: The Ritz-Carlton Doha, Sharq Village & Spa, Somerset West Bay Doha, Simaisma Resort, Sheraton Grand Doha Resort & Convention Hotel, Sealine Beach Resort, Rixos Gulf Hotel Doha, Rixos Qetaifan Island North Doha, Movenpick Hotel Doha, Katara Towers Lusail Marina, Jouri Hotel, Hotel Park, Hilton Salwa Beach Resort & Villas Doha, Dana Club, Al Messila Resort.
- Switzerland: Bürgenstock Resort Lake Lucerne, Hotel Royal Savoy Lausanne, Hotel Schweizerhof – Bern.
- France: Carlton Cannes Hotel, Le Royal Monceau – Raffles Paris, Maison Delano, The Peninsula Paris
- Italy: The Westin Excelsior Rome, Excelsior Hotel Gallia, a Luxury Collection Hotel, Milan,
- UK: Grosvenor House Hotel, The Adria, The Savoy, A Fairmont Managed Hotel
- The Netherlands: InterContinental Amstel Amsterdam
- Spain: InterContinental Madrid
- Morocco: Fairmont Tazi Palace, Tangier
- Egypt: Renaissance Sharm El Sheikh Golden View Beach Resort
- Thailand: Chiva-Som, Hua Hin
- Singapore: Raffles Hotel Singapore
- US: Dream Downtown, New York and Plaza Hotel

=== Investments ===
==== Africa ====
Katara Hospitality's first international investment came in 2006, under its previous identity, Qatar National Hotels Company (QNH). That year, it acquired Egypt's Renaissance Sharm El Sheikh Resort.

In April 2010, QNH signed a deal with the Comoran government to build a $70 million hotel resort in Comoros. The deal came after a donors conference geared towards Comoros was hosted by Qatar in March 2010.

Morocco and the QNH signed a $55 million deal in November 2011 to refurbish the Tazi Palace, located in Tangier.

In Gambia, the company signed a deal with the Gambian government in October 2012 to build a $200 million resort next to Banjul, the capital.

==== Europe ====
The Excelsior Hotel Gallia in Milan, Italy was acquired by the company in 2015. It is part of The Luxury Collection. In addition it runs the Westin Excelsior Rome.

Katara Hospitality has invested in several properties in Paris. Hotels it owns include The Peninsula Paris and the Royal Monceau Raffles Paris.

In Switzerland, the company has invested $1 billion into renovating the Bürgenstock Resort Lake Lucerne, which it owns.

In the Netherlands, Katara Hospitality own the Amstel Hotel run by the Intercontinental Group.

==== Americas ====
Katara Hospitality acquired full ownership of New York City's Plaza Hotel in July 2018 after buying the hotel's ownership stakes from Sahara India Pariwar, and from Ben Ashkenazy and Al-Waleed bin Talal.

== Subsidiaries ==
- Murwab Hotels Group
- Qetaifan Projects Company
