= Stratton Street =

Street in Mayfair, London

Coordinates: 51.50734°N 0.14367°W

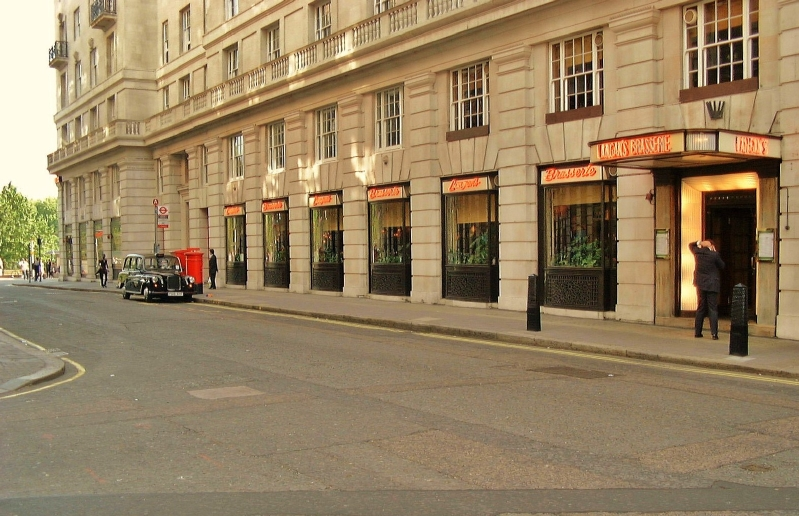
Langan's Brasserie in Stratton Street

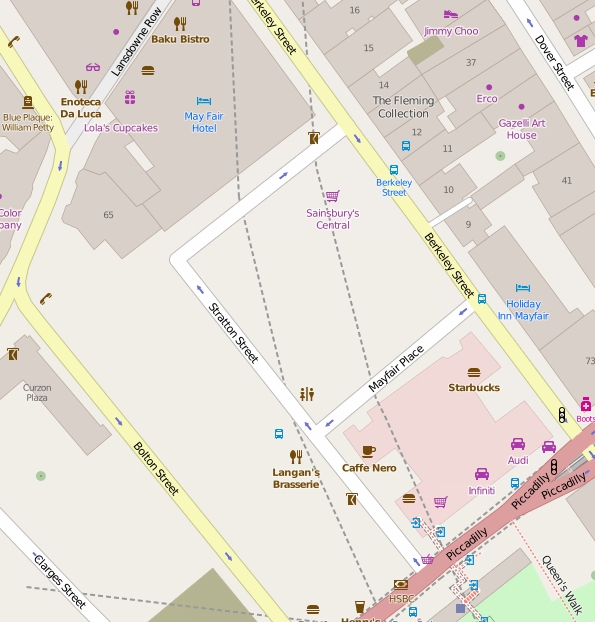
The immediate vicinity of Stratton Street

Stratton Street is a street in the Mayfair district of the City of Westminster, London. It runs from Berkeley Street in the north to Piccadilly in the south.

== History ==
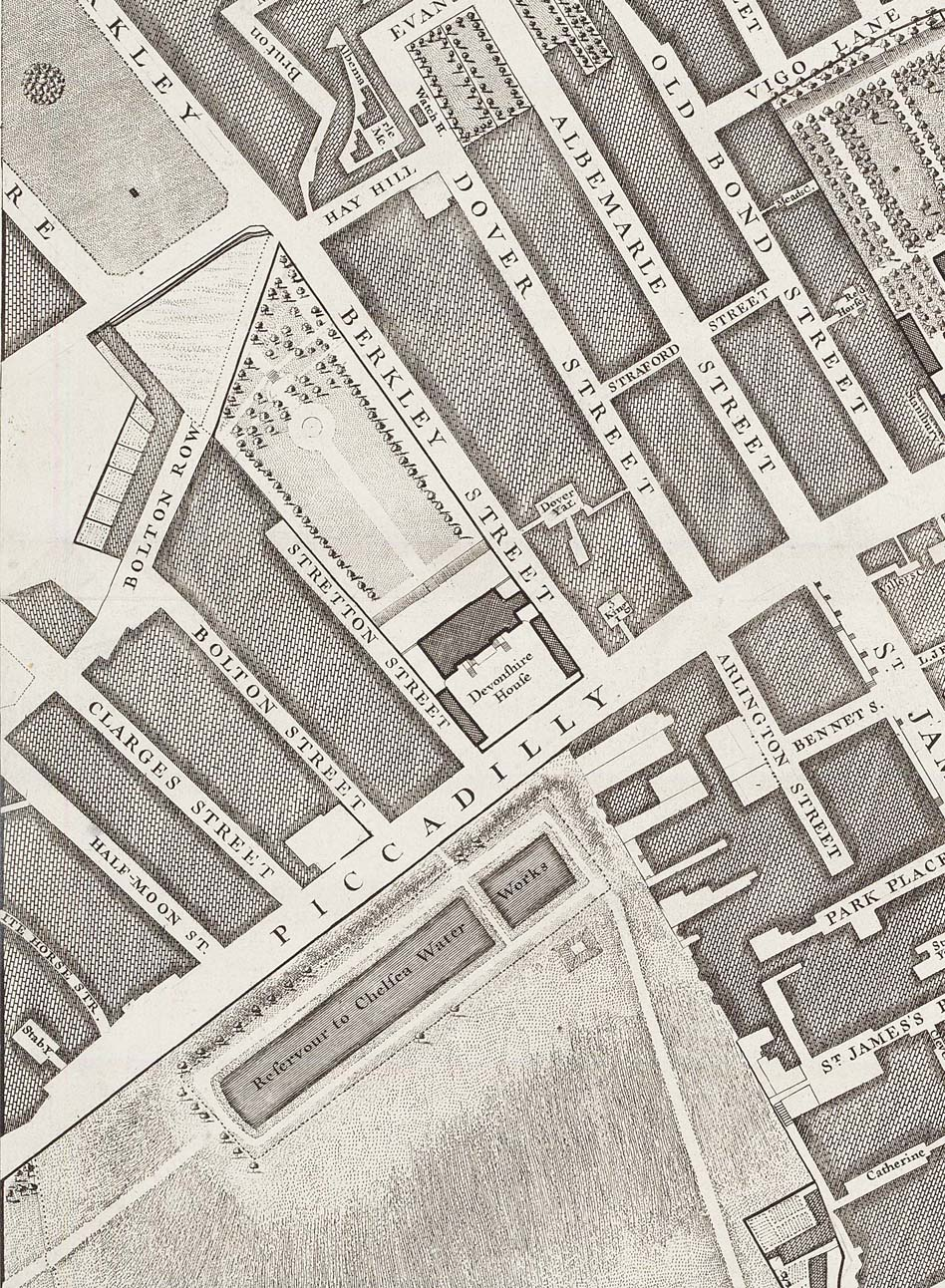
Stratton Street and the recently completed Devonshire House (successor to Berkeley House) on John Rocque's 1746 map of London

Stratton Street started to be built in 1693 on land occupied at some time by Berkeley House, the townhouse of the Berkeley family of Bruton Abbey in Somerset. The title "Baron Berkeley of Stratton in the County of Cornwall", in the Peerage of England, was created in 1658 for John Berkeley, 1st Baron Berkeley of Stratton (1602-1678), of Bruton, a Royalist during the Civil War who had distinguished himself at the Battle of Stratton, fought in 1643 at Stratton in Cornwall. He was descended from Sir Maurice de Berkeley, a younger son of Maurice de Berkeley, 2nd Baron Berkeley (1271-1326) of Berkeley Castle in Gloucestershire, the senior line of the Berkeley family. Berkeley House and its extensive grounds (later purchased by the Duke of Devonshire who rebuilt it as Devonshire House) is memorialised by Berkeley Square, Berkeley Street, Stratton Street and Bruton Street.

On some early maps it appears as "Stretton Street". The street was originally a cul-de-sac, running north from Piccadilly with Devonshire House on its eastern side, but in 1924 Devonshire House was demolished and Stratton Street was extended from its northern end eastwards to Berkeley Street, giving it the present right-angled shape. Mayfair Place, which joins the two streets lower down, was laid out at the same time.

== Notable inhabitants ==
Notable inhabitants have included the poet Thomas Campbell, General Thomas Graham, Lord Lynedoch, William Burn and Baroness Burdett-Coutts. Both Thomas Jodrell Phillips Jodrell and his great-nephew Edward Cotton-Jodrell resided at number 13. Ambrose, the dance band leader, lived in Stratton Street from 1927 to 1940. A blue plaque marks the spot.

== Buildings ==
Numbers 6, 8, and 15 Stratton Street are all listed buildings with Historic England. Langan's Brasserie, formerly the Coq d'Or, has occupied the street since 1976.
