= Monaco Hebdo =

Monegasque weekly newspaper

- Type: Weekly newspaper
- Owner(s): Caroli Group
- Editor-in-chief: Raphaël Brun
- General manager: Roberto Testa
- Founded: May 1995; 30 years ago
- Language: French
- Circulation: 3,000 (2010)
- Website: monaco-hebdo.com

Monaco Hebdo is a Monegasque weekly newspaper established in 1995. It is the only weekly newspaper in the principality.

== History ==
The first issue of the newspaper was published on 11 May 1995. In 2007, the newspaper employed three journalists and had a circulation of 3,000. It is owned by the Caroli Group.

In 2005, Didier Laurens was appointed editor-in-chief of the newspaper, but was dismissed the following year and replaced by Miléna Radoman. Laurens claimed that his dismissal was the result of the newspaper's reporting of a private land sale by Monaco's pension fund (caisse de retraite) to Franck Biancheri. However, Antonio Caroli, owner of the Caroli Group, denied the claims and stated that Laurens had been dismissed due to problems with superiors and subordinates. Radoman remained in the position through 2014.

== See also ==
- List of newspapers in Monaco
