= Nina Campbell =

English interior designer and businesswoman

- Born: Henrietta Sylvia Campbell; 9 May 1945 (age 81)
- Education: Heathfield School
- Spouses: Andrew de Chappuis Konig (m. 1971; div. 1978) John Deen (m. 1981; div. 1991)
- Children: 3
- Relatives: Ronald Ian Campbell (uncle); Sir Guy Campbell (great-great-grandfather)

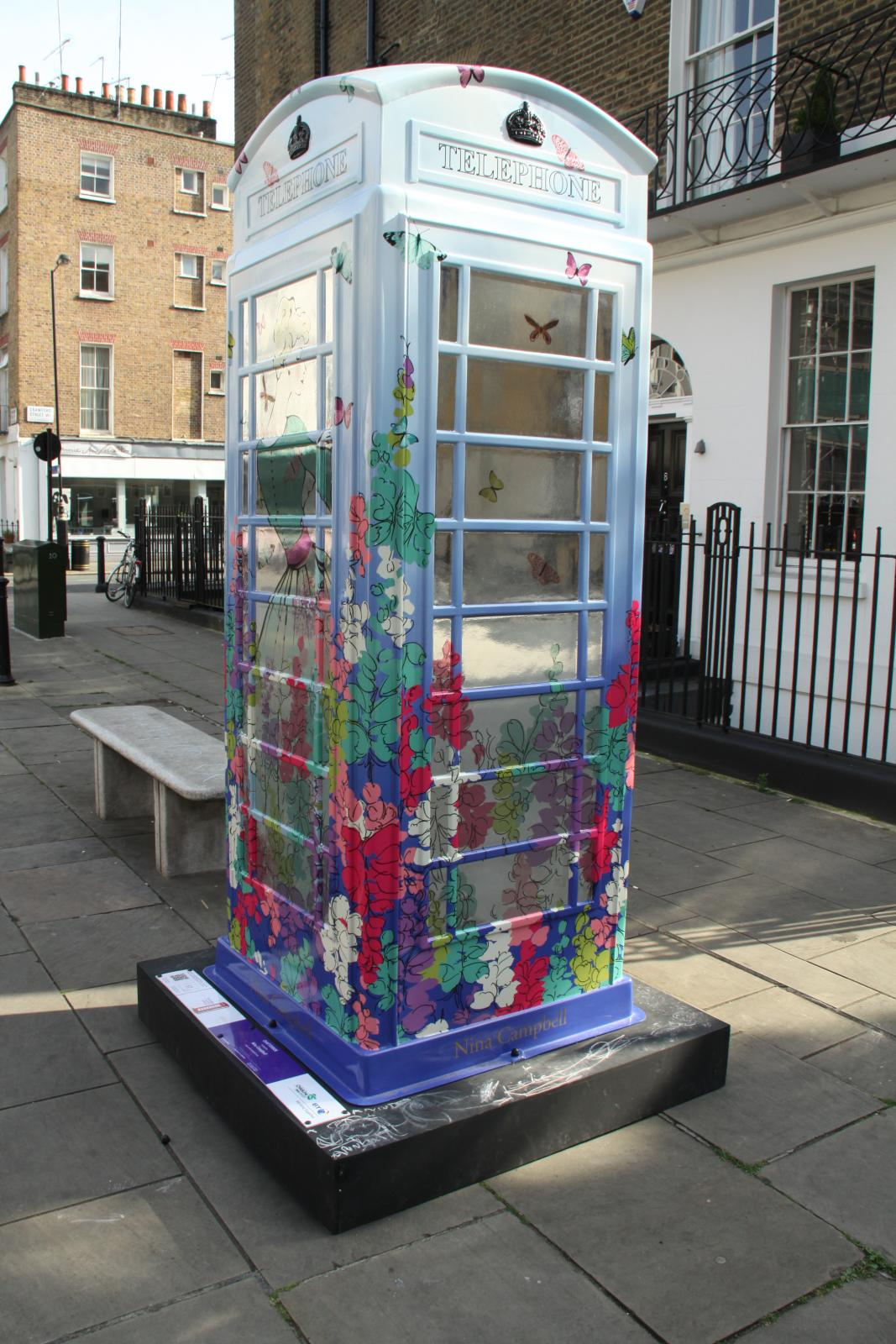
Chatterbox A BT Artbox design by Nina Campbell in 2012

Henrietta Nina Sylvia Campbell OBE (born 9 May 1945) is an English interior designer and businesswoman, whose clients include the Duke and Duchess of York, Ringo Starr, Rod Stewart and the Capital Hotel in Knightsbridge. She is known for her heart-shaped spectacles.

== Early years ==
Nina is the daughter of Colonel John Archibald Campbell, who was educated at Eton and fought in both World Wars, and Elizabeth Popper Pearth from Pittsburgh, Pennsylvania. Her parents divorced in 1960. Her uncle was the British diplomat Ronald Ian Campbell and she is the great-great-granddaughter of Sir Guy Campbell, the first of the Campbell baronets of St Cross Mede. Nina was educated at Heathfield School, Ascot, then began her career working for Colefax & Fowler. Since going independent, she also markets her own fabric, wallpaper and tableware designs, both online and through the retailers John Lewis. In May 2023, Nina Campbell was presented with the House & Garden Top 100 Lifetime Achievement Award sponsored by Lapicida.

== TV and radio ==
She appeared as a castaway on the BBC Radio programme Desert Island Discs on 16 March 1997. Nina has twice appeared as guest designer on the BBC programme DIY SOS: The Big Build, first on 18 January 2012, in Season 23, Episode 2 from Conwy and a second time on 13 November 2013, in the special episode The Big Build for Children in Need: Peterborough.

== Personal life ==
Nina married Andrew Guy Louis de Chappuis Konig in 1971 with whom she had two children, Henrietta (Rita) Lucy Elizabeth Konig (born July 1973) and Maximillian John Konig (born November 1976). They divorced in 1978. She then married John Henry Deen in 1981, with whom she had a third child, Alice Nina Deen (born 6 August 1982). They divorced in 1991. She lives in Chelsea, London and is godmother to her friend Geri Halliwell's daughter.

== Publishing ==
Nina Campbell's impact extends beyond interior design into the realm of publishing. She has authored several influential books on design:

- A House in Maine (2023)
- Nina Campbell Interior Decoration: Elegance and Ease (2018)
- Nina Campbell Interiors (2013)
- Nina Campbell Decorating Journal (2008)
- Elements of Design: Elegant Wisdom That Works for Every Room in Your Home (2007)
- Nina Campbell's Decorating Notebook: Insider Secrets and Decorating Ideas for Your Home (2004)
- Nina Campbell's Decorating Notebook : Professional Styling Schemes for Your Own Home (2003)
- Nina Campbell's Decorating Secrets: Easy Ways to Achieve the Professional Look (2000)
- Nina Campbell on Decorating (1996)
- Elsie De Wolfe: A Decorative Life: (Panache) (1992)
