= Capital Hotel, London =

Hotel in Knightsbridge, London

Capital Hotel
- Location within Central London

General information
- Location: 22–24 Basil Street, Knightsbridge, London, England, United Kingdom
- Coordinates: 51°30′0.36″N 0°9′42.12″W
- Opening: April 1971
- Owner: David Levin

Capital Hotel is a small 5-star hotel in London, England. It is located at 22–24 Basil Street, Knightsbridge, and is known to have been visited by The Queen.

It was established by David Levin in April 1971.

== Interior ==
The Capital Hotel is a townhouse hotel with 49 individually designed rooms. It features the work of designers such as Nina Campbell and David Linley. The Capital is known for its classic English style, and has eight suites and a two floor penthouse.

== Restaurant ==
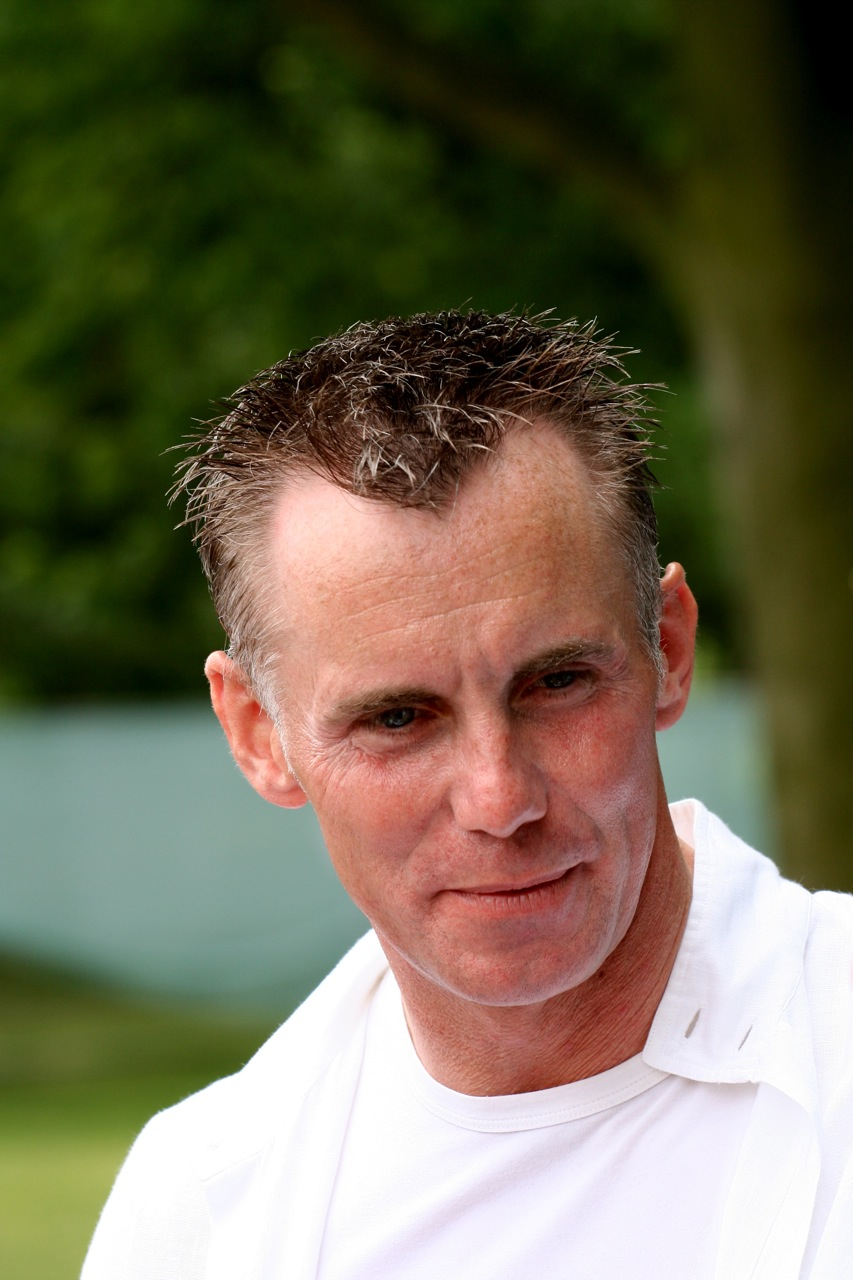
Gary Rhodes who worked at the hotel restaurant

In 1974 the hotel's restaurant, The Capital Restaurant, was one of the first three hotel restaurants in London to achieve a Michelin Star under chefs Richard Shepherd and Brian Turner. In 2001 it earned a second star under Éric Chavot. Other notable chefs who have worked there include Gary Rhodes and Paul Merrett. The restaurant lost its stars after Chavot's departure in 2009.

By 2013, the hotel's restaurant had been replaced by a new restaurant, Outlaw's at The Capital, the only London restaurant of seafood chef Nathan Outlaw. Outlaw's at The Capital had one Michelin star. In 2025, Brown announced his return to the Capital Hotel in Knightsbridge, where he had previously served as head chef of Nathan Outlaw's restaurant. On 10 April 2025, he launched Tom Brown at The Capital, serving a modern seafood tasting menu focused on sustainable British produce.
