= Patrick Procktor =

British artist (1936–2003)

Patrick Procktor RA (12 March 1936 – 29 August 2003) was a British painter and printmaker.

== Early life ==
Patrick Procktor was born in Dublin, the younger son of an oil company accountant, but moved to London when his father died in 1940. From the age of 10, he attended Highgate School – where his teachers included landscape painter Kyffin Williams – intending to read classics at university. However, his mother's income was insufficient to fund his further education and after a period working with a north London builders' merchants 18-year-old Procktor was conscripted into the Royal Navy where, during his National Service, he learned to speak Russian.

== Professional artist ==
Subsequently, while working as a Russian interpreter with the British Council, Procktor began to paint and draw in his spare time, and was accepted by the Slade School of Fine Art in 1958. There he was influenced by artists including William Coldstream and Keith Vaughan, developing a dark, figurative painting style.

In 1962 he became a professional artist and had his first show at The Redfern Gallery in London's Cork Street in 1963 – a great commercial success that helped confirm his reputation among a wider artistic circle including the theatre and music (he won numerous commissions for pop record sleeves). A year later, Procktor was featured in Bryan Robertson's New Generation exhibition at the Whitechapel Gallery – a show that also raised the profile of fellow artists David Hockney, Bridget Riley and John Hoyland.

Beginning in 1964, Procktor, Vaughan, Robert Medley amongst others, took part in a drawing group at Procktor's home which became a "cross-generational gay network".

Procktor's work, primarily in oils, acrylics and watercolour, drew on pop art influences, but was also influenced by his travels. He visited Italy, Greece, India, Egypt, China, and Japan, among other places), and once declared "the light in Egypt is violet, in China daffodil, in Venice opalescent". He was also adept at print-making, producing a sequence to illustrate a new 1976 edition of Coleridge's The Rime of the Ancient Mariner. In 1984 he was commissioned to paint a reredos for the St John the Baptist's Chapel in Chichester Cathedral. His model for the various figures of St John was his friend the photographer David Gwinnutt.

Procktor's painting The Guardian Readers was used as the cover art for Elton John's 1976 album, Blue Moves.

Procktor was elected a member of the Royal Academy in 1996 and died seven years later, aged 67.

== Personal life ==
Procktor lived in Manchester Street, Marylebone, central London (in a flat formerly occupied by William Coldstream), where he socialised with, among others, Derek Jarman, Francis Bacon, and Cecil Beaton (several of Beaton's photographs of Procktor are in the National Portrait Gallery; Procktor's own 1967 pen and ink drawing of Joe Orton is also in the Gallery's collection).

Despite his homosexual leanings, in 1973 Procktor married a widow, neighbour and restaurateur Kirsten Benson. She sold her restaurant (Odin's) to Peter Langan, and Procktor, Hockney, Bacon and Lucian Freud all provided paintings to hang on the walls of Odin's and Langan's Brasserie in return for hospitality. He appeared, as himself, in the 1974 Hockney biopic, A Bigger Splash.

An obituary in The Independent said of his death:

The annual dinner at the Royal Academy will be much duller for his anarchic absence, that tapering six-foot-six frame, topped by a fez, seemingly on the verge of imminent collapse as it swayed and teetered above the throng. And Marylebone has never been the same since the fire in 1999 that destroyed his flat and drove him from a neighbourhood he had graced with his hats and trailing scarves, velvet coats and carpet slippers for the last 40 years.
