= Excelsior Hotel Gallia =

Hotel in Milan, Italy

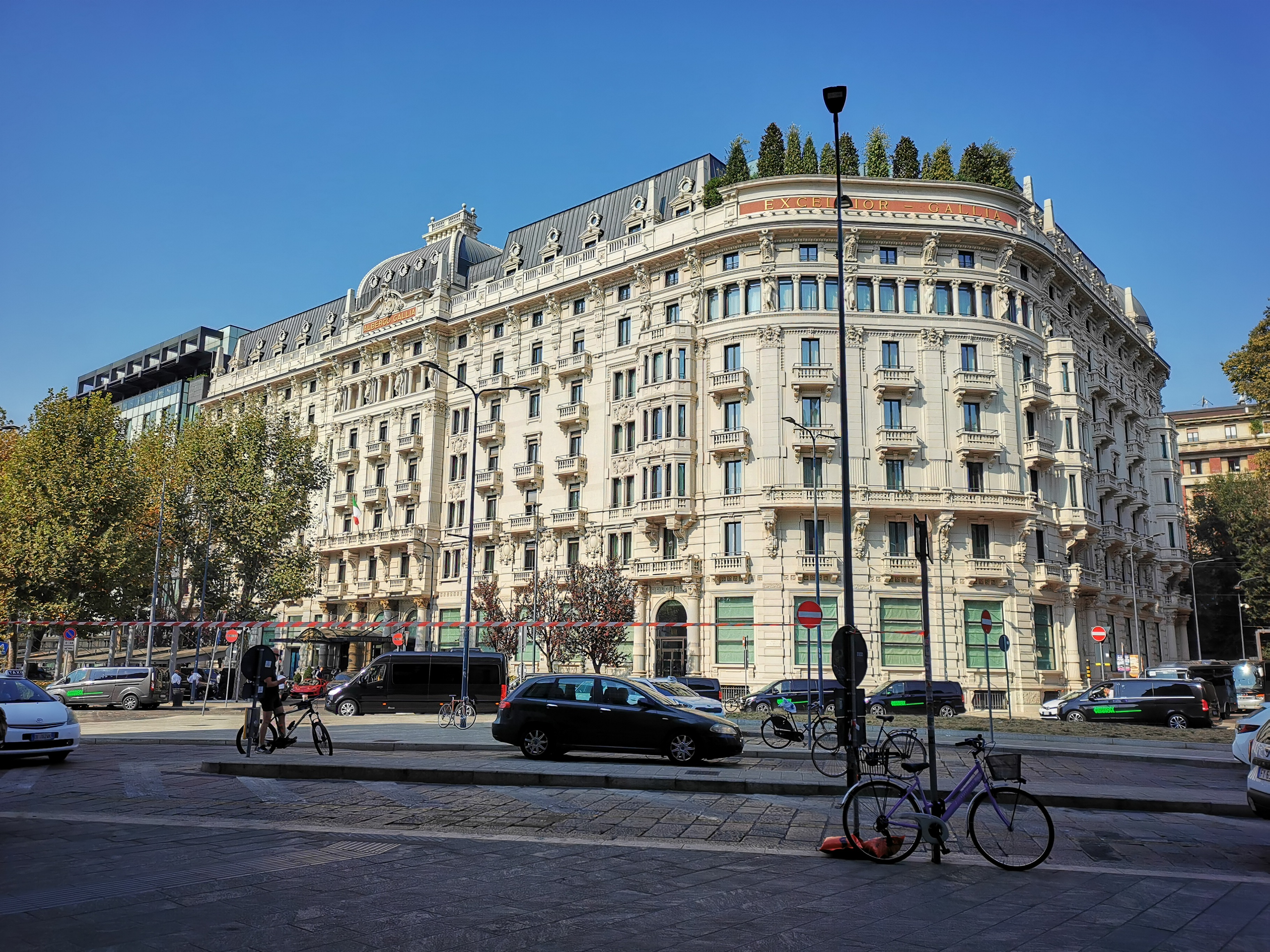
- The Excelsior Hotel Gallia in 2021
- Interactive map of the Excelsior Hotel Gallia area

General information
- Location: Milan, Italy
- Coordinates: 45°29′09.24″N 9°12′06.77″E
- Opened: 1932; 94 years ago

The Excelsior Hotel Gallia is a historic luxury hotel located in Milan, Italy.

== History ==
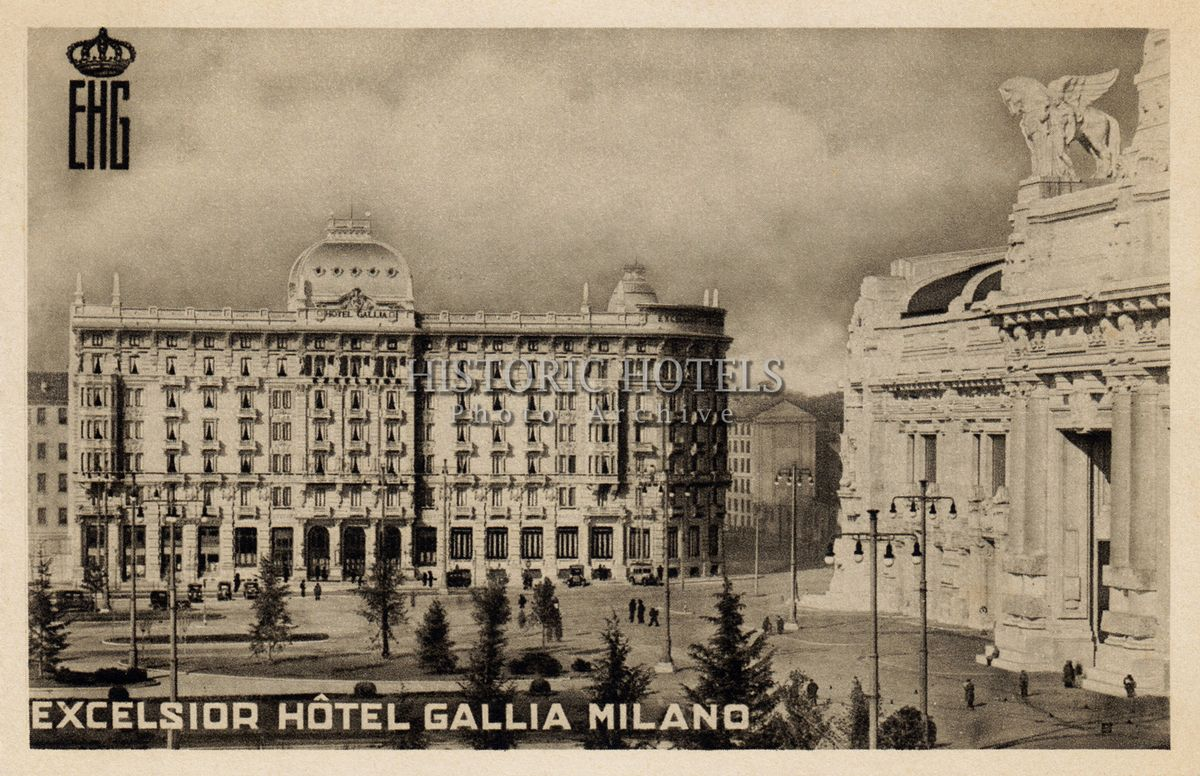
Vintage view

Created at the initiative of the Gallia family and conceived in a strategic location next to the new Milano Centrale railway station, the hotel was designed by Giuseppe Laveni and Aldo Avati. Construction was completed in 1927, but due to delays in the railway station works, the official opening took place only on 29 February 1932. From the very beginning, the hotel established itself as a landmark destination for travelers, entrepreneurs, and figures from the cultural and social elite.

In 2006, the hotel was acquired by Qatar Investment Authority for more than €100 million, becoming part of the hospitality arm of the Qatari sovereign wealth fund, Katara Hospitality, which promoted a major renovation project. The works, overseen by the architecture firm Marco Piva, were completed in 2015.

== Description ==
The hotel is located in Piazza Duca d'Aosta, next to Milano Centrale railway station. The historic building, with Art Nouveau façades, is complemented by a new wing in glass and steel.

The property features 235 rooms and suites.

== Gallery ==
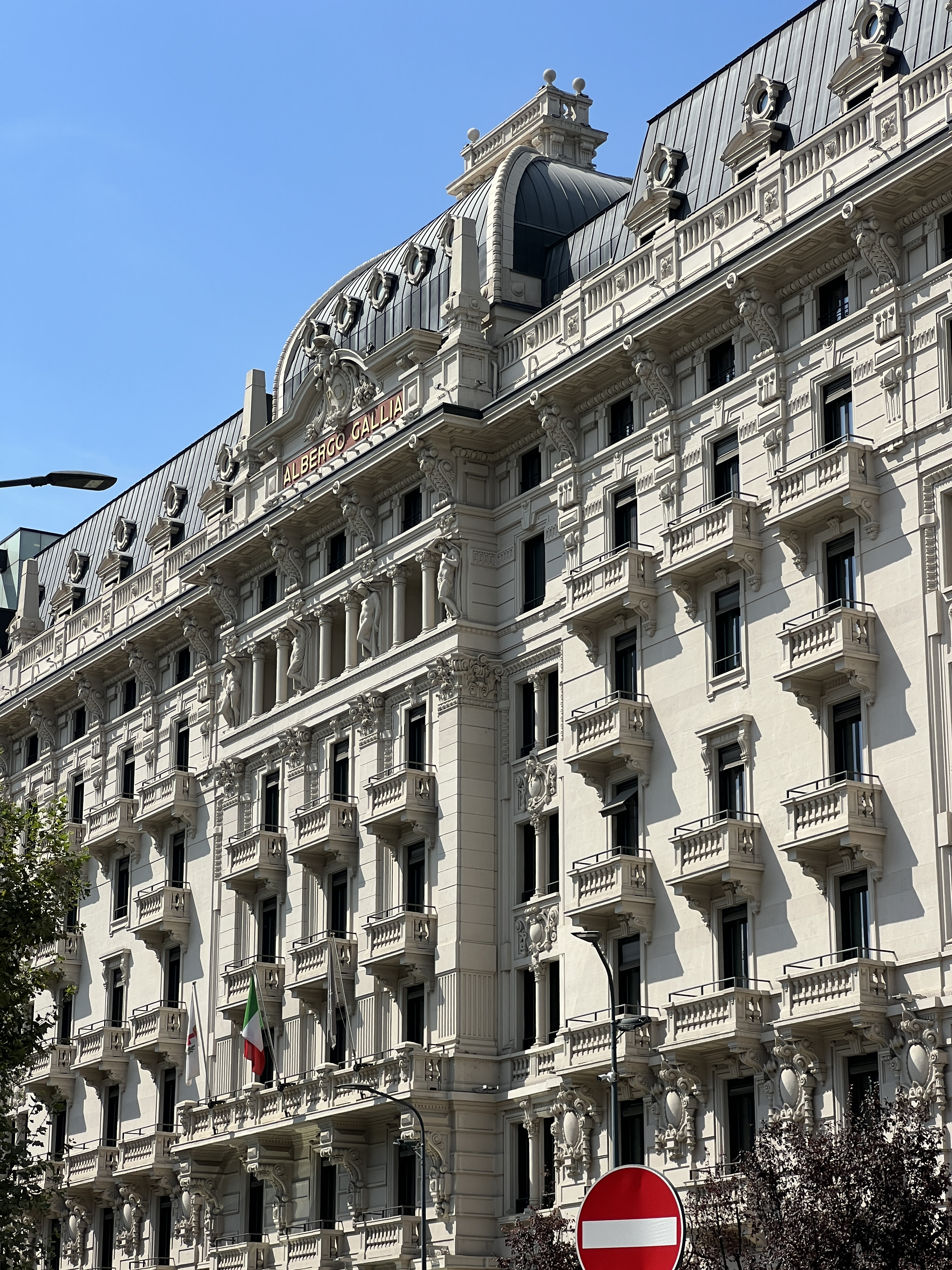

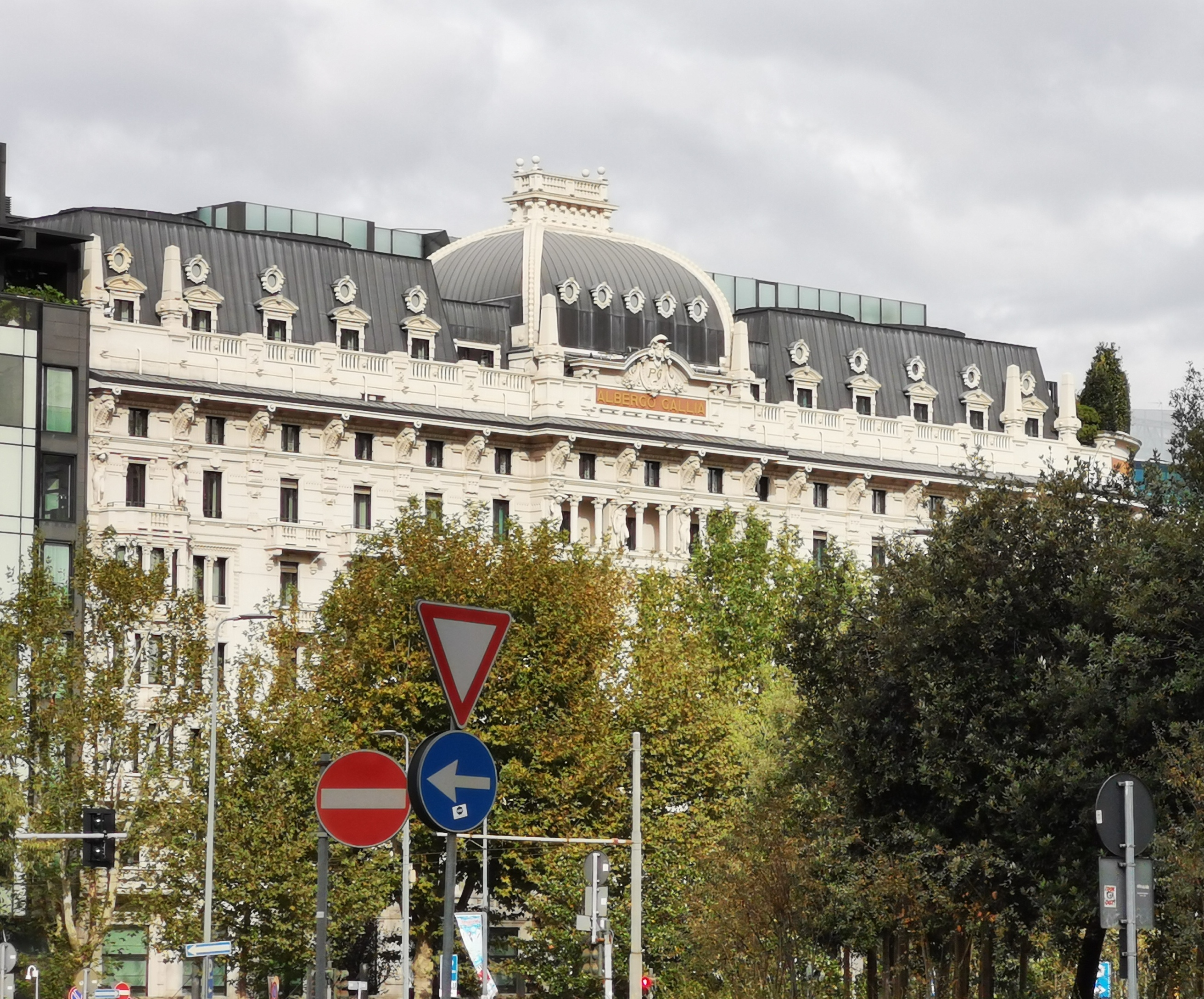

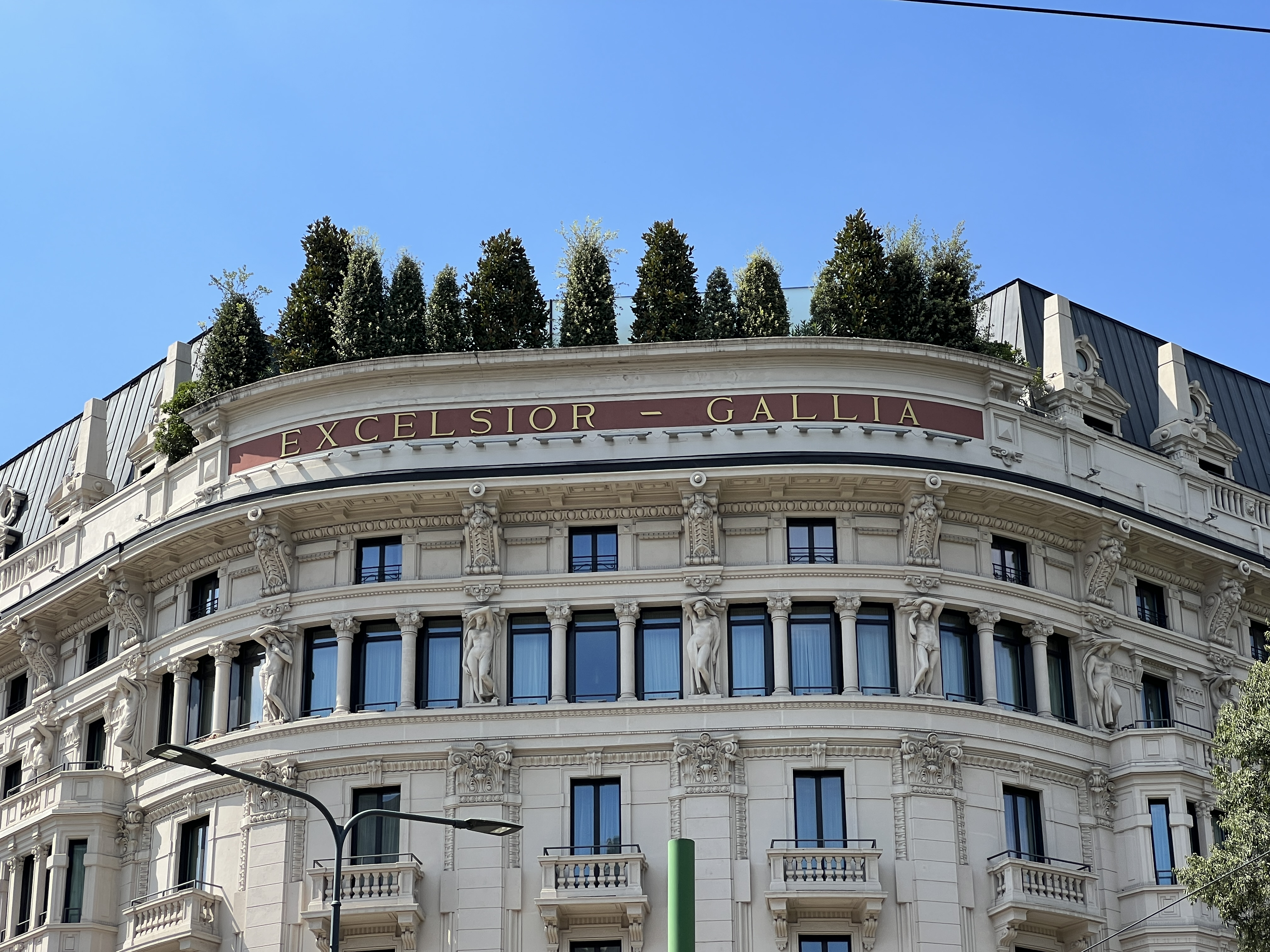
