= InterContinental Amstel Amsterdam =

Hotel in Amsterdam, Netherlands

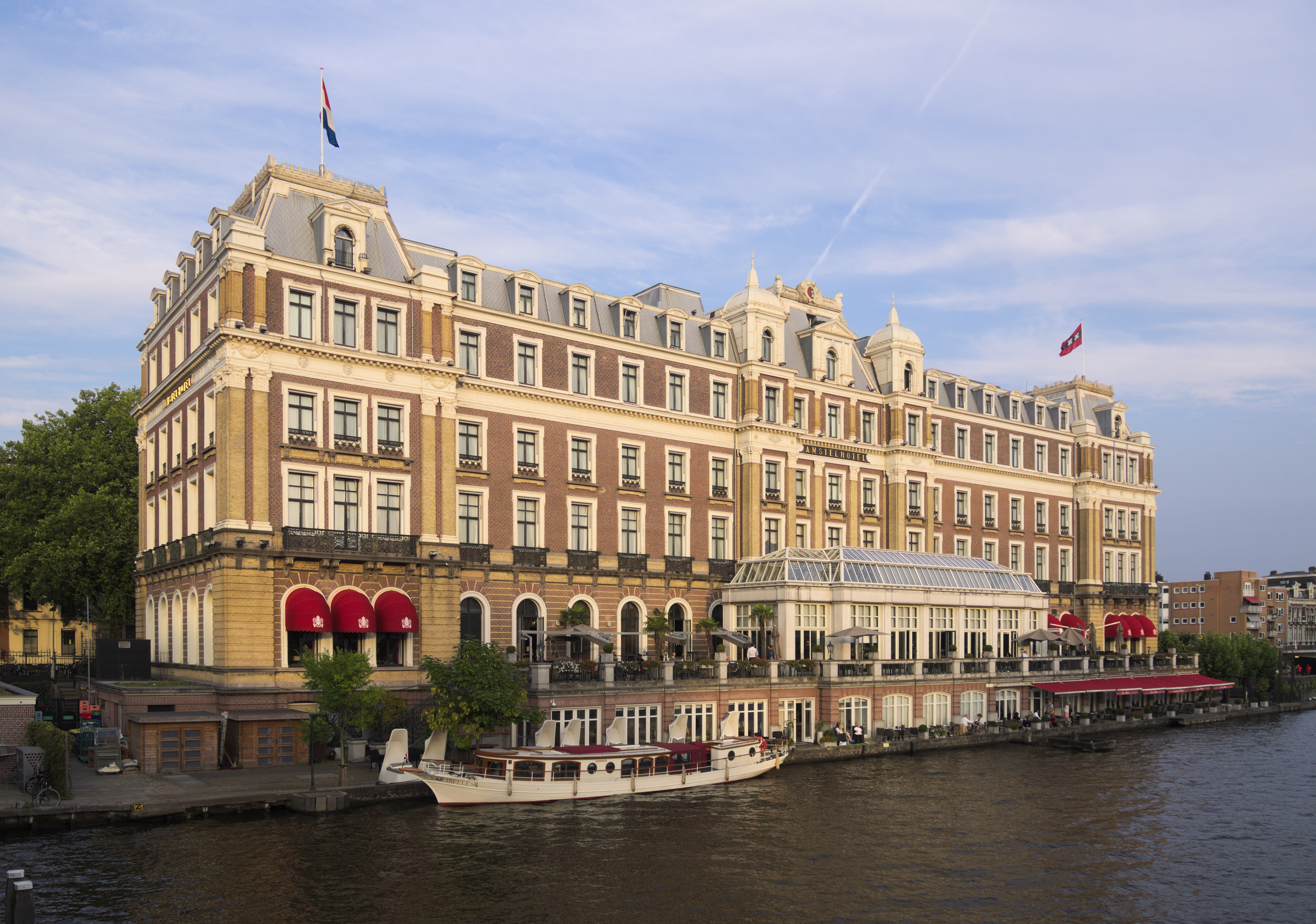
- The Amstel Hotel on the bank of the Amstel river

- Location within Amsterdam

General information
- Location: Amsterdam, Netherlands
- Coordinates: 52°21′36″N 4°54′18.5″E
- Opening: 1867
- Owner: Katara Hospitality
- Operator: InterContinental Hotels Group

Design and construction
- Architect: Cornelis Outshoorn

Other information
- Number of rooms: 55
- Number of suites: 24
- Number of restaurants: 2 (1 restaurant and 1 brasserie)

Website
- https://amsterdam.intercontinental.com

The InterContinental Amstel Amsterdam Hotel, commonly referred to as the Amstel Hotel, is a hotel in Amsterdam, capital city of the Netherlands, on the east bank of the river Amstel.

In 2007, it was the only hotel in the Netherlands on the list of World's Best Hotels, and was ranked in 90th place.

The Amstel Hotel is part of the InterContinental Hotels chain. In 2006 the building was sold to Morgan Stanley. In 2011 the Lebanese businessman Toufic Aboukhater bought the hotel. In 2014 the hotel was acquired by Qatar-based Katara Hospitality, but is still operated by the InterContinental Hotels Group

== Amenities ==
Restaurant La Rive had earned one, later two Michelin stars in the period 1993–2016.

== History ==
Samuel Sarphati, a physician and city planner, took the initiative to build the hotel, although he died in June 1866 before the hotel opened. The architect was Cornelis Outshoorn. Originally it was planned to build the front of the hotel facing the present Sarphatistraat. Due to financial problems, only the wing along the Amstel was built.

== Renovation ==
In late September 1992, the Amstel Hotel was reopened after a two-year renovation. During the closure, craftsmen, artisans and engineers restored the entire hotel, at a cost of over ƒ70 million. The former 111 rooms were changed in 55 luxury rooms and 24 suites.

In 2017–2018, there was a major renovation of the facade and roof. Beside technical and safety improvements, it was also used to reconstruct the historical looks of the hotel. Both the original colour scheme and the once disappeared lions are now (2018) present again.

In October 2004 a test revealed the presence of legionella in the water system. As a precaution the hotel was evacuated and the guests transferred to other hotels. Several measures were undertaken to prevent a repeat of the incident, including the installation of special filters.

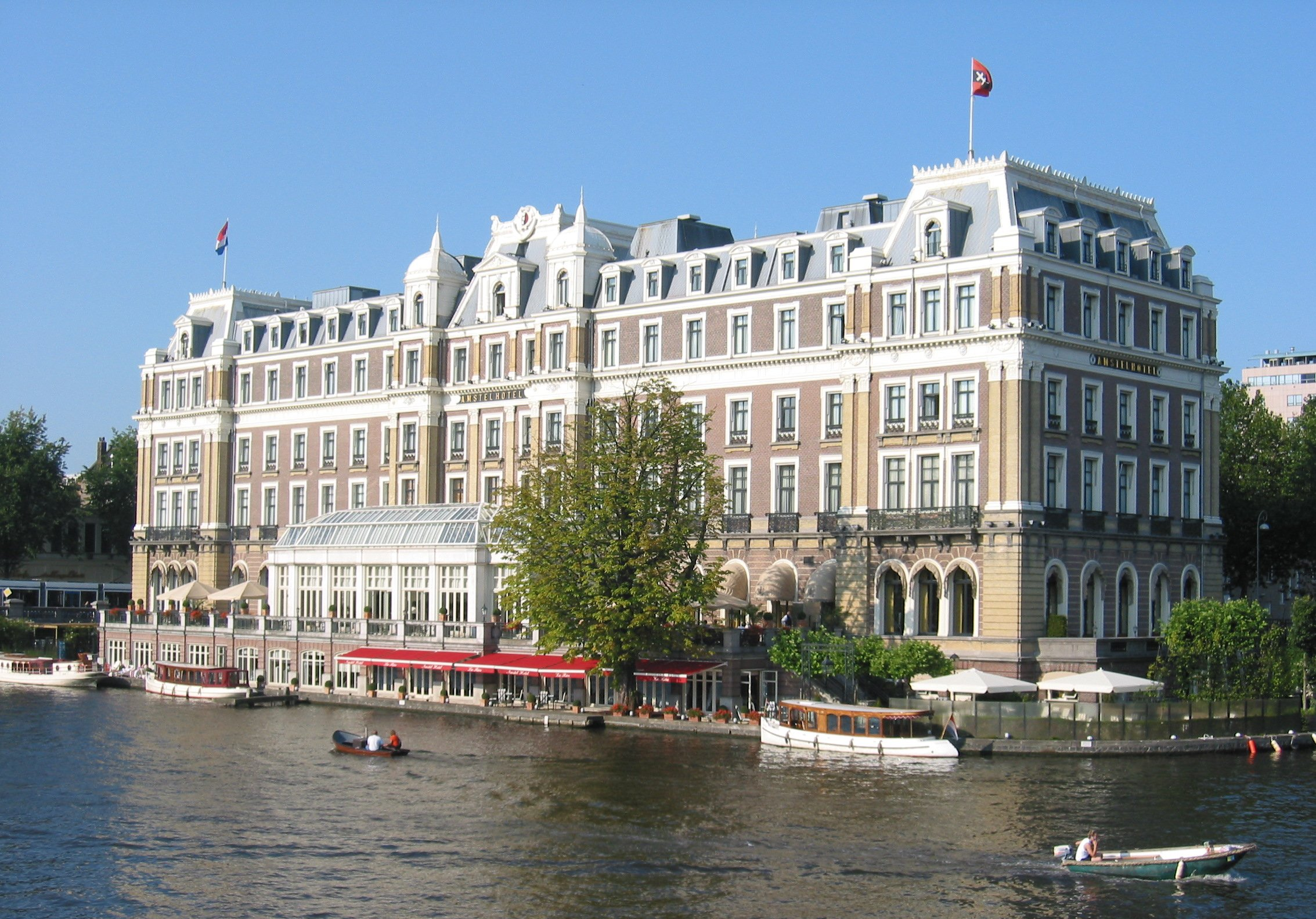
Amstel Hotel seen from the River Amstel

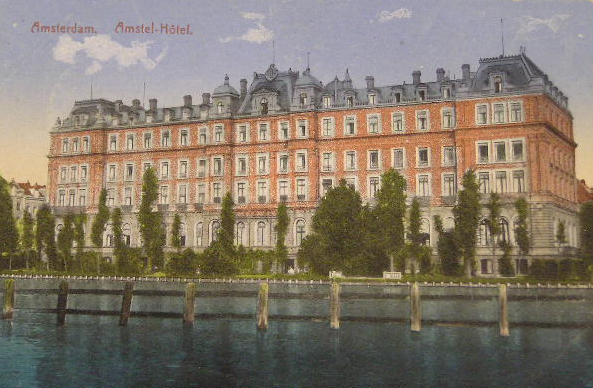
Amstel Hotel about 1923

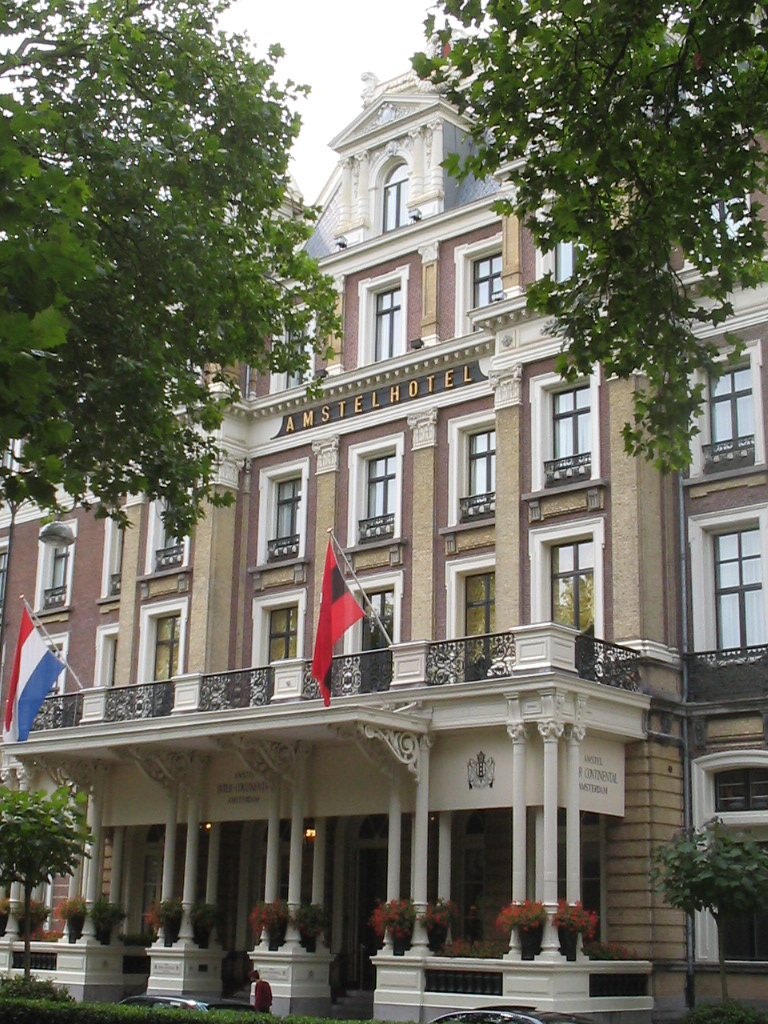
Main entrance at the Professor Tulpplein
