= L'Observateur de Monaco =

- Categories: News magazine
- Frequency: Monthly
- Founded: 2005
- First issue: November 2005
- Company: Caroli Group
- Country: Monaco
- Based in: Fontvieille
- Language: French
- Website: | lobservateurdemonaco.com

L'Observateur de Monaco (French pronunciation: [lɔpsɛʁvatœʁ də mɔnako]) is a monthly news magazine in Monaco.

== History ==
The magazine was established as a weekly magazine in 2005. Catherine Boniffassi was the first editor-in-chief.

By 2007, it became a monthly magazine.

=== Ownership ===
L'Observateur de Monaco was first owned by Enrico Braggiotti, then later by Patrice Pastor.

It was acquired by Maurice Cohen in January 2010.

By August 2010, it was acquired by Francesco Caroli through his Caroli Group.
