= Fairmont Monte Carlo =

Hotel in Monte Carlo, Monaco

Coordinates: 43°44′24″N 7°25′48″E

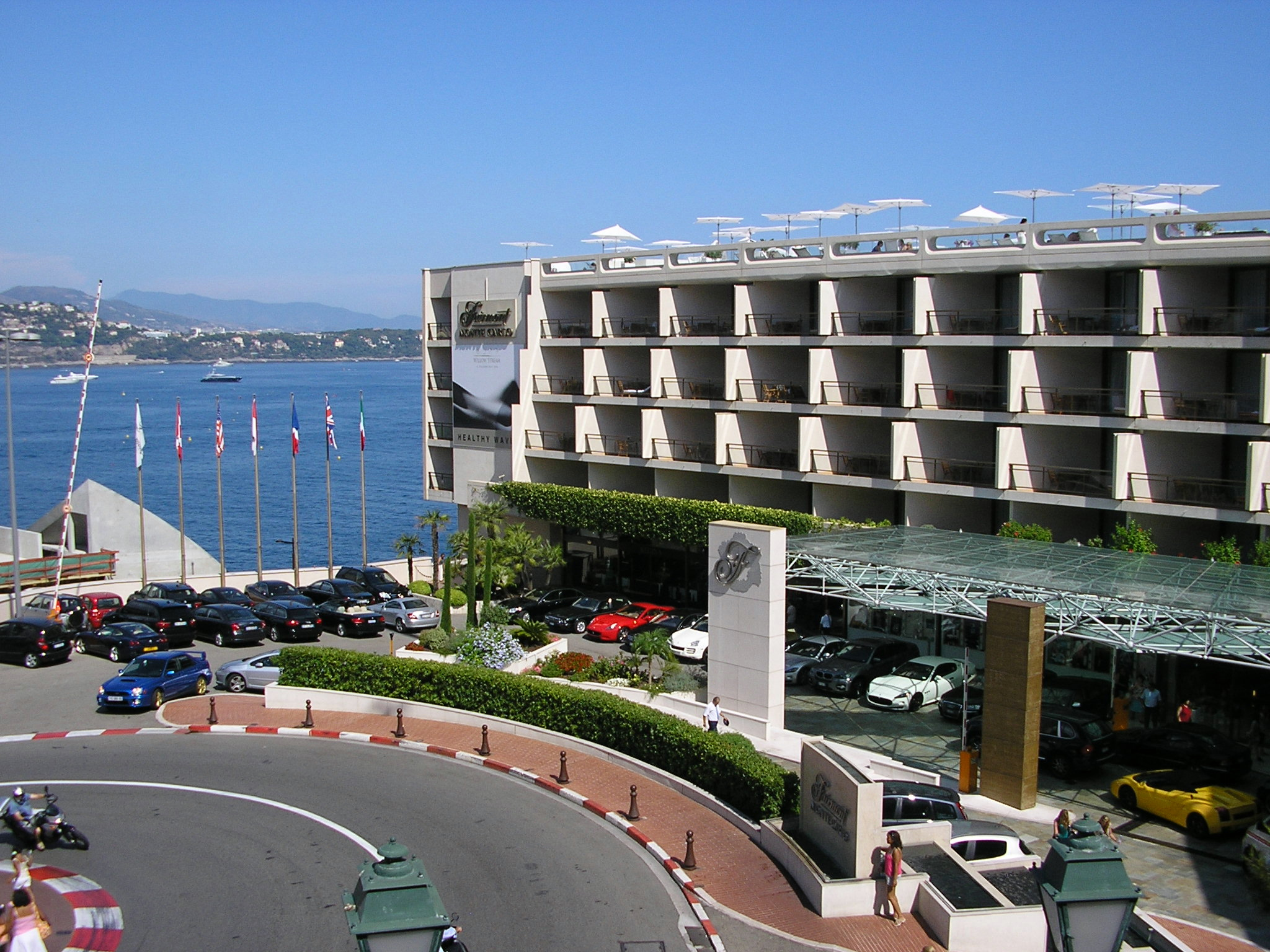
- Interactive map of the Fairmont Monte Carlo area

General information
- Type: Resort hotel
- Location: Monte Carlo, Monaco, 12 Avenue des Spélugues
- Opened: August 20, 1975; 50 years ago
- Operator: Fairmont Hotels and Resorts

Technical details
- Floor count: 7

Design and construction
- Architects: Jean Ginsberg, Jean and José Notari, and Herbert Weisskamp
- Developer: Caroli Group

Other information
- Number of rooms: 602
- Number of suites: 30
- Number of restaurants: 3

Website
- fairmont.com/monte-carlo

The Fairmont Monte Carlo, formerly Loews Monte-Carlo, is a resort hotel located in the Monte Carlo area of Monaco, at the famous hairpin turn of the Circuit de Monaco, which is the slowest corner on the Formula One racing calendar.. It is managed by Fairmont Hotels and Resorts, a subsidiary of the Accor hospitality company.

== History ==
Construction of the hotel was completed in the early 1970s. The hotel was built on the site of the first Monégasque railway station by the Caroli Group, a real estate development company. There is still a section of the original station wall hidden in one of the hotel's offices. Instead of building the hotel up the rocks, the structure is partially built into the Mediterranean coast.

The hotel opened in August 1975 – managed by Loews Hotels – as the Loews Monte-Carlo. In 1998, Toufic Aboukhater bought the hotel from Loews Hotels Holding Corporation for an undisclosed amount and renamed it the Monte Carlo Grand Hotel.

In 2004, the hotel was acquired by Fairmont Hotels and Resorts for 215 million euros and renamed as the Fairmont Monte Carlo. It was the first purchase by a joint venture between Fairmont, Kingdom Hotels International and Bank of Scotland Corporate. The hotel was renovated in 2005, 2009 and again in 2024.

During the annual Monaco Grand Prix at the Circuit de Monaco, the drivers make use of the "tunnel" under the hotel.

== See also ==
- Société des Bains de Mer de Monaco
