= Éric Chavot =

French chef

Éric Chavot (French: [eʁik ʃavo]; born 1967) is a French Michelin starred chef. He was working the head chef at the Bob Bob Cité and Bob Bob Ricard restaurants in London until January 2020, as well as the consultant chef at the Royal Albert Hall's Coda restaurant. Born in Arcachon, Gironde, Chavot was trained at the Boucanier, then at the Patio.

== In Britain ==
Chavot trained in France before moving to London to continue his culinary pursuits. He worked as sous chef under Raymond Blanc at Le Manoir aux Quat' Saisons in Great Milton, Oxfordshire; and then London's La Tante Claire and Harvey's. He then worked as Head Chef at Marco Pierre White's "The Restaurant", the Hyde Park Hotel and Chez Nico at Ninety, Park Lane, London. He then started his own restaurant Interlude de Chavot and later Chavot on the Fulham Road.

=== The Capital ===
Chavot was appointed Head Chef of The Capital Restaurant in August 1999, with the menu based around French cuisine-inspired dishes. His flavourful and creatively presented dishes earned him two Michelin stars. The Guardian's critic Jay Rayner judged:

The point here is the food, which is the sort of brilliant faux paysanne stuff you get when you put a culinary aristocrat in the kitchen.

Marco Pierre White describes Chavot as "The best in London without a doubt." In 2008, Chavot represented the United Kingdom at the 25th anniversary celebration of the International Academy of Gastronomy, held at the Hotel Le Bristol in Paris.

=== Selfridges and the Weston Family ===
Chavot left the Capital in 2009 and worked with French chef Pierre Koffman at a special Pop Up restaurant on Selfridges London. The Capital lost both its Michelin stars when he left. Chavot is an occasional columnist in The Observer, and was a guest chef on Saturday Kitchen with James Martin. He caused controversy when accidentally swearing on the programme broadcast on 23 May 2009.

After his stint at Selfridges he spent two seasons at the exclusive Weston estate in Florida troubleshooting their restaurants and implementing processes and methods for delivering his food to the residents.

=== Other restaurants ===
At the start of 2013 the eponymous Brasserie Chavot in Conduit Street was launched, next to and part of the Westbury hotel. It received a Michelin star the following year, but closed in 2015. Chavot worked as the head chef of Bob Bob Cité, previously Bob Bob Ricard when he joined, from August 2017 to January 2020, citing "private, family reasons".
