= Le Mirabeau =

- Interactive map of the Le Mirabeau area

General information
- Status: Completed
- Architectural style: Modernist
- Location: 1, Avenue Princesse Grace, Monte-Carlo, Monaco
- Coordinates: 43.74°N 7.43°E
- Completed: 1973
- Owner: David and Frederick Barclay

Technical details
- Floor count: 26

Design and construction
- Developer: Caroli Group

Le Mirabeau is a high-rise building in Monaco. Formerly a luxury hotel, it is now a residential building.

== Location ==
It is located at number 1 on the Avenue Princesse Grace in Monte-Carlo, Monaco.

== History ==
It was built by the Caroli Group with concrete in the modernist architectural style in 1973. It is eighty-one metres high, with twenty-six storeys. It is the twelfth-tallest building in Monaco.

It was formerly a luxury hotel managed by Société des bains de mer de Monaco (SBM). The owners were David and Frederick Barclay, through their holding company called Ellerman Investments. It was home to La Coupole, a restaurant run by chef Didier Aniès, which received one star in the Michelin Guide. In 2004, the building was renovated by architects Ivan Brico and Ange Pecoraro. In December 2007, the hotel closed down. In May 2008, 1,000 SBM employees stopped outside the former hotel during their demonstration to express their discontent at their allegedly poor working conditions.

It was renovated by the construction firm J.B. Pastor & Fils from 2007 to 2010, and turned into a residential building. A green wall was added.

The Club des Résidents Etrangers de Monaco (CREM) is headquartered in this building.
