= La Réserve de Beaulieu & Spa =

- Interactive map of the La Réserve de Beaulieu & Spa area

General information
- Location: Beaulieu-sur-Mer
- Coordinates: 43.70562°N 7.33532°E
- Opening: 1880
- Owner: Jean-Claude Delion

Website
- reservebeaulieu.com

La Réserve de Beaulieu & Spa is a five-star hotel and spa in Beaulieu-sur-Mer, France. It is a member of The Leading Hotels of the World. It was bought in 1997 by Nicole and Jean-Claude Delion. The Delions also own La Résidence de la Pinède hotel in Saint-Tropez.

Historic guests have included Winston Churchill and Pablo Picasso.
