= Modern sculpture =

Era of sculpture beginning with Auguste Rodin

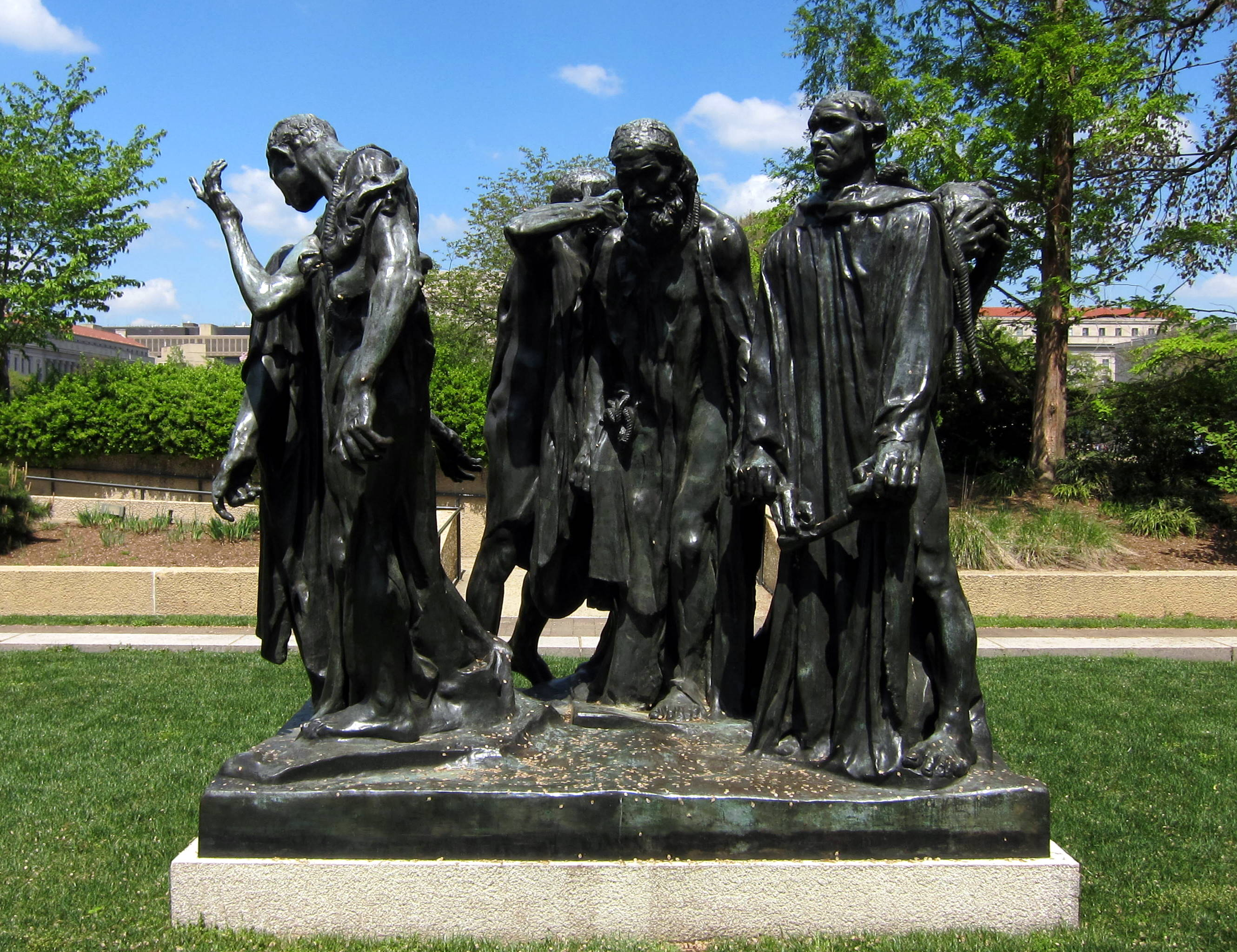
Auguste Rodin, The Burghers of Calais, 1889, Hirshhorn Museum and Sculpture Garden, Washington, D.C., cast 1943.

Modern sculpture is generally considered to have begun with the work of Auguste Rodin, who is seen as the progenitor of modern sculpture. While Rodin did not set out to rebel against the past, he created a new way of building his works. He "dissolved the hard outline of contemporary Neo-Greek academicism, and thereby created a vital synthesis of opacity and transparency, volume and void". Along with a few other artists in the late 19th century who experimented with new artistic visions in sculpture like Edgar Degas and Paul Gauguin, Rodin invented a radical new approach in the creation of sculpture. Modern sculpture, along with all modern art, "arose as part of Western society's attempt to come to terms with the urban, industrial and secular society that emerged during the nineteenth century".

Modernist sculpture movements include Art Nouveau, Cubism, Geometric abstraction, De Stijl, Suprematism, Constructivism, Dadaism, Surrealism, Futurism, Formalism, Abstract expressionism, Pop-Art, Minimalism, Postminimalism, Land art, Conceptual art, and Installation art among others.

== Modernism ==
Alberto Giacometti, Cat, 1954, Metropolitan Museum of Art

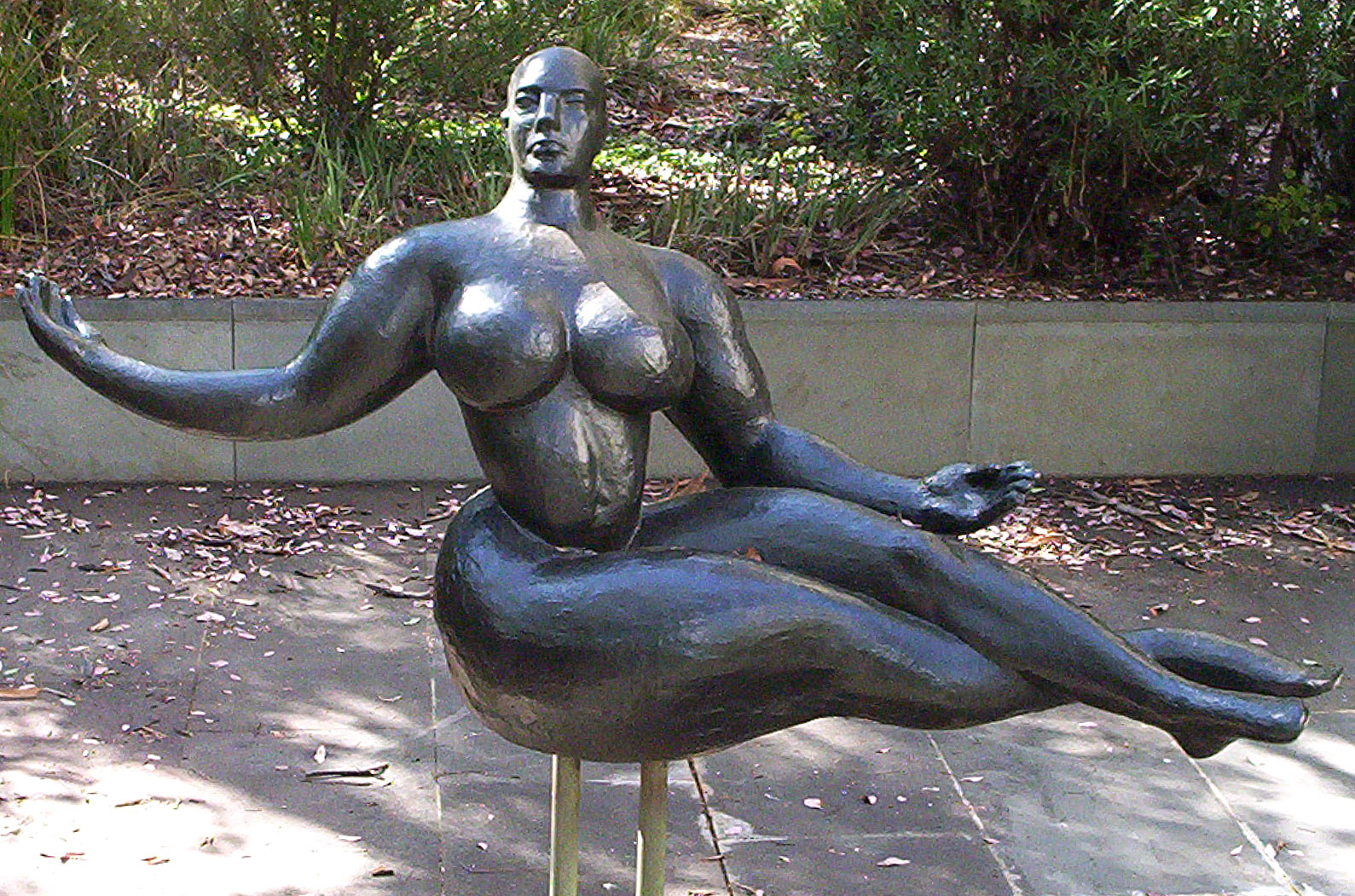
Gaston Lachaise, Floating Figure 1927, bronze, no. 5 from an edition of 7, National Gallery of Australia

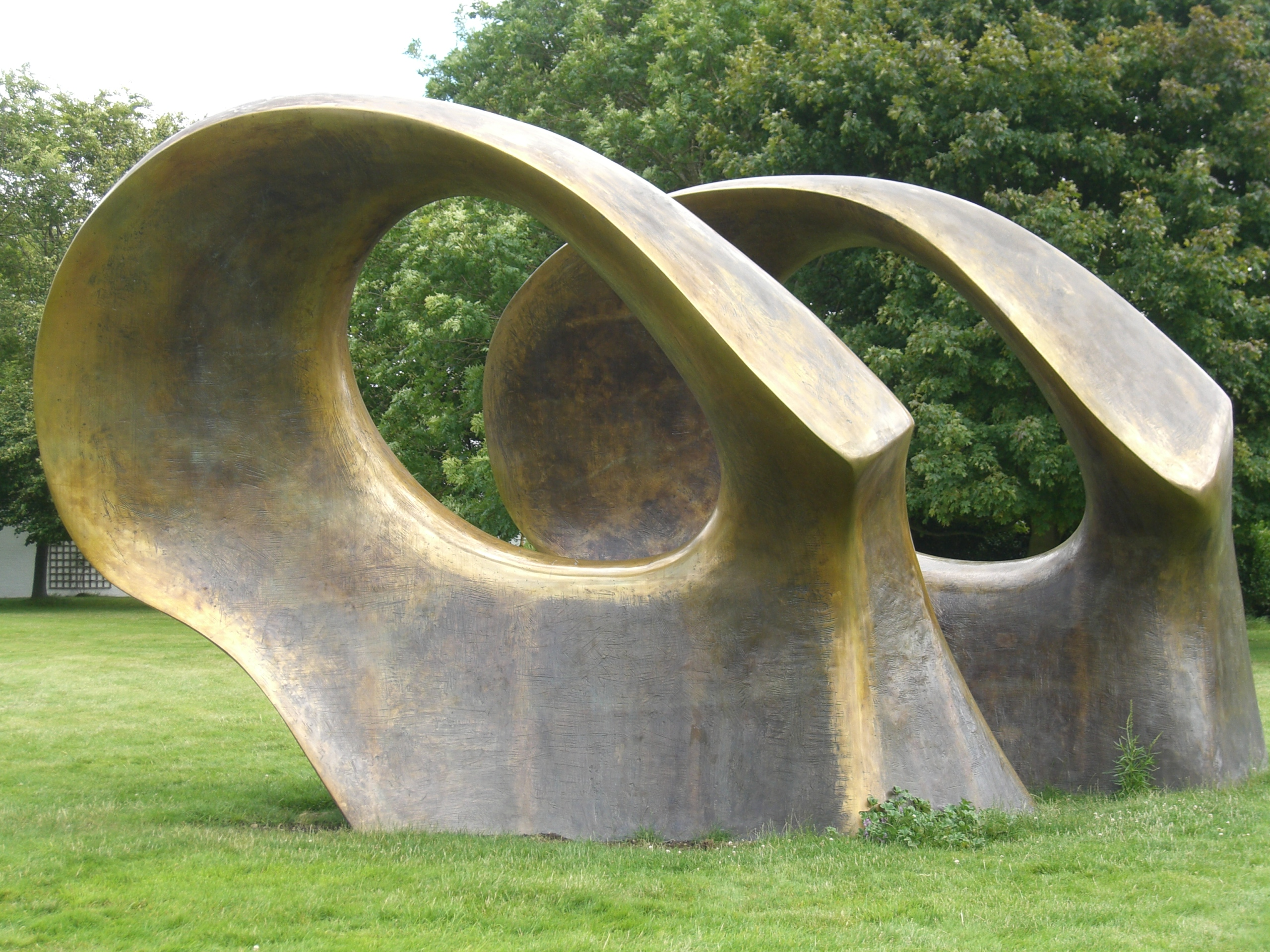
Henry Moore, Double Oval (1966), Henry Moore Foundation

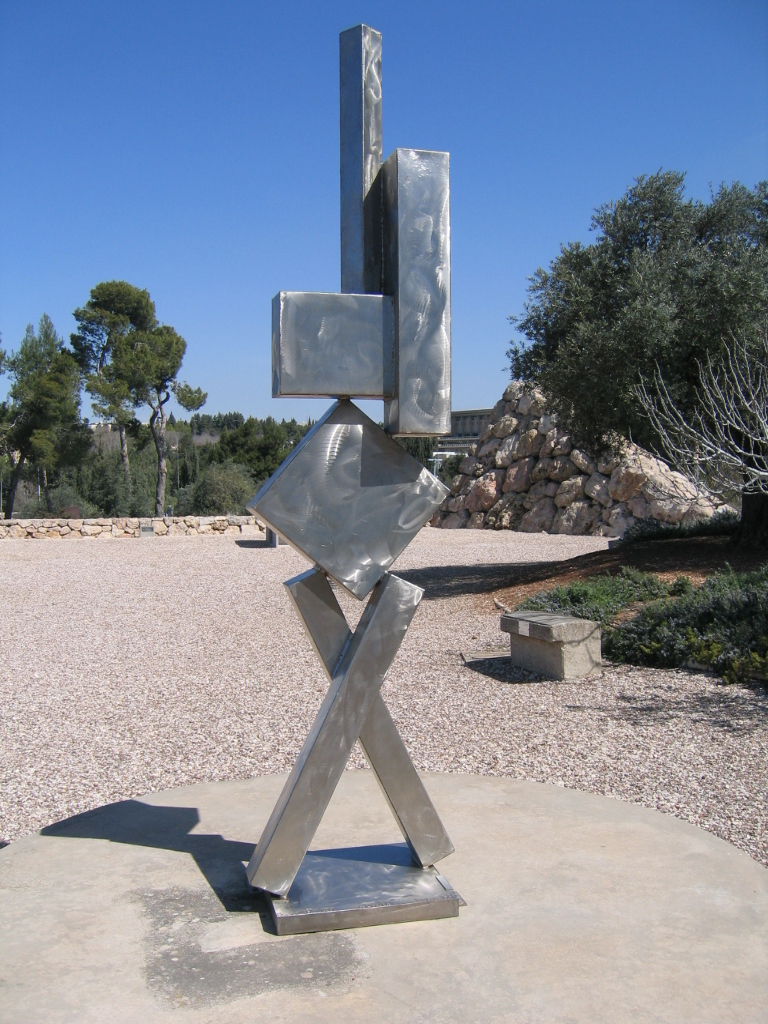
David Smith, CUBI VI (1963) at the Israel Museum in Jerusalem

The modern sculpture movement can be said to begin at the Rodin exhibit at the Universal Exhibition held in Paris in 1900. At this event Rodin showed his Burghers of Calais, Balzac, Victor Hugo statues, and the exhibition included the first public showing of his Gates of Hell which included The Thinker.

Cubist sculpture, in the early 20th century, was a style that developed in parallel with cubist painting, and the formal experiments of Georges Braque and Pablo Picasso. Beginning around 1909 and evolving through the early 1920s cubist artists developed new means of constructing works of art using collage, sculptural assemblage using disparate materials and traditional sculpture making from plaster and clay molds. Some sources name Picasso's 1909 bronze Head of a Woman as the first cubist sculpture.

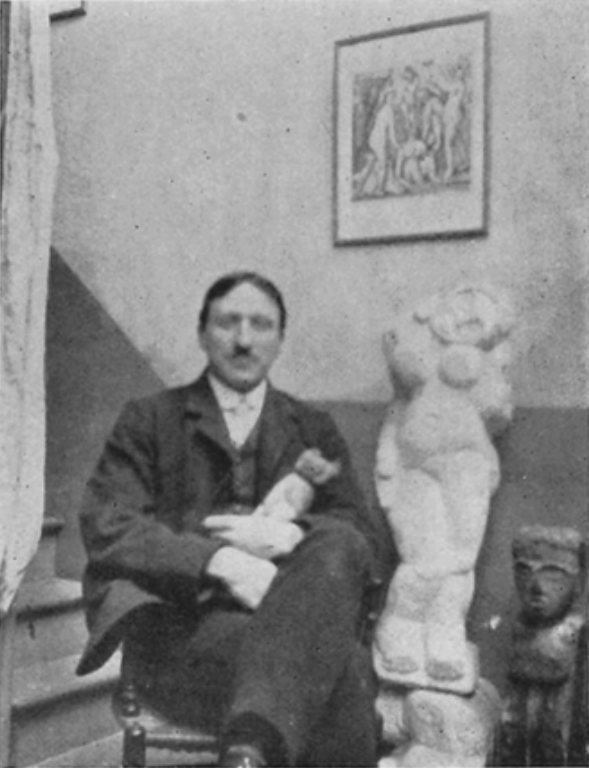
André Derain, 1908, photograph published in Gelett Burgess, "The Wild Men of Paris", Architectural Record, May 1910. Sculpture: Nu debout (Standing Woman), 1907

Artists like Raymond Duchamp-Villon (1876-1918), whose career was cut short by his death in military service, and Alexander Archipenko, who'd arrived in Paris in 1908 and whose 1912 Walking Woman were very quick to follow Braque and Picasso's lead. Joseph Csaky, a sculptor from Hungary, exhibited his first cubist sculptures in Paris in 1911. Duchamp-Villon, Jacques Lipchitz, Henri Laurens and Ossip Zadkine and others joined the earlier cubist sculptors.

In the early 20th century, during his period of cubist innovation, Pablo Picasso revolutionized the art of sculpture when he began creating his constructions fashioned by combining disparate objects and materials into one constructed piece of sculpture; Picasso reinvented the art of sculpture with his innovative use of constructing a work in three dimensions with disparate material, the sculptural equivalent of the collage in two-dimensional art. Just as collage was a radical development in two-dimensional art; so was construction a radical development in three-dimensional sculpture. The advent of Surrealism led to things occasionally being described as "sculpture" that would not have been so previously, such as "involuntary sculpture" in several senses, including coulage. In later years Picasso became a prolific potter, leading, with interest in historic pottery from around the world, to a revival of ceramic art, with figures such as George E. Ohr and subsequently Peter Voulkos, Kenneth Price, and Robert Arneson. Marcel Duchamp originated the use of the "found object" (French: objet trouvé) or readymade with pieces such as Fountain (1917).

Similarly, the work of Constantin Brâncuși at the beginning of the century paved the way for later abstract sculpture. In revolt against the naturalism of Rodin and his late 19th-century contemporaries, Brâncuși distilled subjects down to their essences as illustrated by the elegantly refined forms of his Bird in Space series (1924). These elegantly refined forms became synonymous with 20th-century sculpture. In 1927, Brâncuși won a lawsuit against the U.S. customs authorities who attempted to value his sculpture as raw metal. The suit led to legal changes permitting the importation of abstract art free of duty.

Brâncuși's impact, with his vocabulary of reduction and abstraction, is seen throughout the 1930s and 1940s, and exemplified by artists such as Gaston Lachaise, Sir Jacob Epstein, Henry Moore, Alberto Giacometti, Joan Miró, Ásmundur Sveinsson, Julio González, Pablo Serrano, Jacques Lipchitz and also by the 1940s abstract sculpture was impacted and expanded by Alexander Calder, Len Lye, Jean Tinguely, and Frederick Kiesler who were pioneers of Kinetic art.

== Post-1950s ==
Since the 1950s Modernist trends in sculpture both abstract and figurative have dominated the public imagination and the popularity of Modernist sculpture had sidelined the traditional approach. Picasso was commissioned to make a maquette for a huge, 50-foot (15 m)-high public sculpture to be built in Chicago, known usually as the Chicago Picasso. He approached the project with a great deal of enthusiasm, designing a sculpture which was ambiguous and somewhat controversial. What the figure represents is not known; it could be a bird, a horse, a woman, or a totally abstract shape. The sculpture, one of the most recognizable landmarks in downtown Chicago, was unveiled in 1967. Picasso refused to be paid $100,000 for it, donating it to the people of the city.

In the late 1950s and the 1960s, abstract sculptors began experimenting with a wide array of new materials and different approaches to creating their work. Surrealist imagery, anthropomorphic abstraction, new materials and combinations of new energy sources and varied surfaces and objects became characteristic of much new modernist sculpture. Collaborative projects with landscape designers, architects, and landscape architects expanded the outdoor site and contextual integration. Artists such as Isamu Noguchi, David Smith, Alexander Calder, Jean Tinguely, Richard Lippold, George Rickey, Louise Bourgeois, and Louise Nevelson came to characterize the look of modern sculpture.

By the 1960s Abstract expressionism, Geometric abstraction and Minimalism, which reduces sculpture to its most essential and fundamental features, predominated. Some works of the period are: the Cubi works of David Smith, and the welded steel works of Sir Anthony Caro, as well as welded sculpture by a large variety of sculptors, the large scale work of John Chamberlain, and environmental installation scale works by Mark di Suvero. Other Minimalists and Postminimalists include Tony Smith, Donald Judd, Robert Morris, Anne Truitt, Ronald Bladen, Giacomo Benevelli, Arnaldo Pomodoro, Richard Serra, Carl Andre, Dan Flavin, Eva Hesse, Christo, Walter De Maria, Robert Smithson, and others like John Safer who added motion and monumentality to the theme of purity of line, led contemporary abstract sculpture in new directions. During the 1960s and 1970s figurative sculpture by pop artists and modernist artists in stylized forms by artists such as: George Segal, Claes Oldenburg, Arman, Leonard Baskin, Ernest Trova, Marisol Escobar, Paul Thek, Manuel Neri and others became popular. In the 1980s several artists, among others, exploring figurative sculpture were Robert Graham in a classic articulated style and Fernando Botero bringing his painting's "oversized figures" into monumental sculptures. Ceramic sculpture as practiced by Pablo Picasso, Peter Voulkos, Stephen De Staebler, Kenneth Price, and others became an important idiom of modern sculpture in the 20th century.

=== Gallery of modern sculpture ===
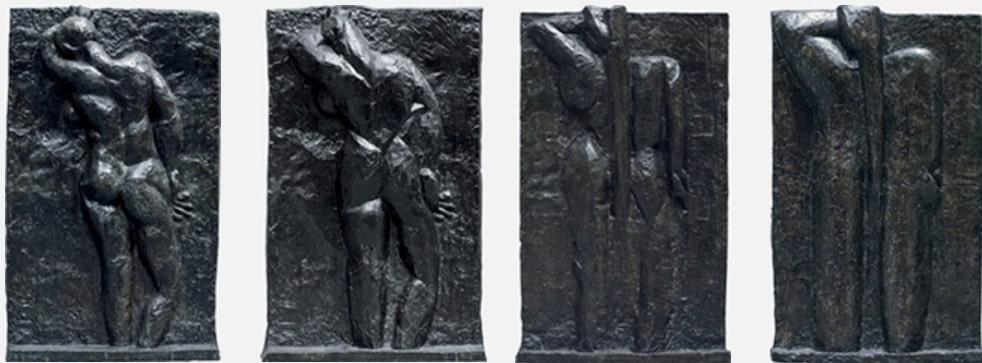
Henri Matisse, The Back Series, bronze, left to right: The Back I, 1908–09, The Back II, 1913, The Back III 1916, The Back IV, c. 1931, all Museum of Modern Art, New York

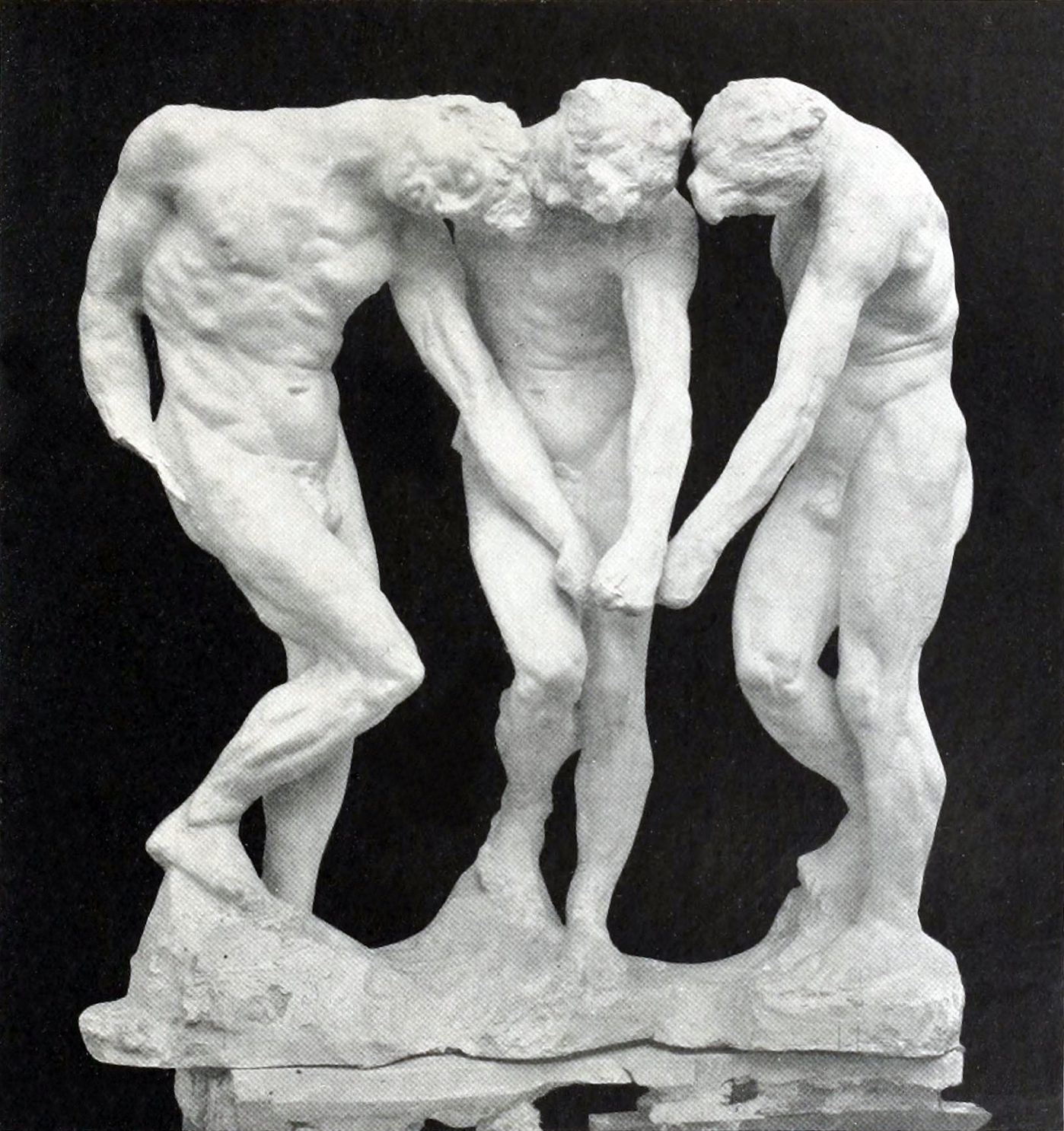
Auguste Rodin, The Three Shades, before 1886, plaster, 97 x 91.3 x 54.3 cm. In Dante's Divine Comedy, the shades, i.e. the souls of the damned, stand at the entrance to The Gates of Hell, pointing to an unequivocal inscription, “Abandon hope, all ye who enter here”. Rodin assembled three identical figures that seem to be turning around the same point.

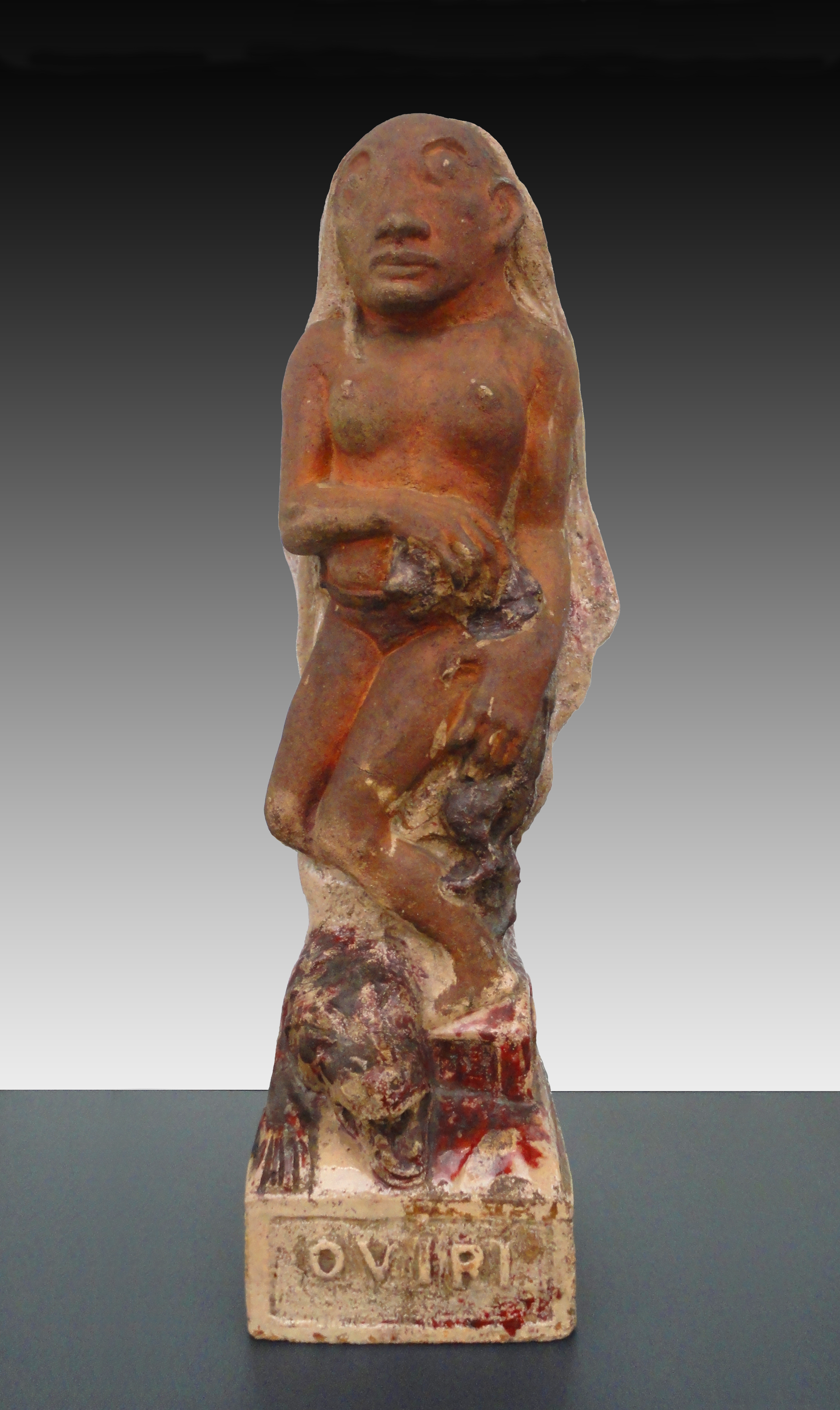
Paul Gauguin, 1894, Oviri (Sauvage), partially glazed stoneware, 75 x 19 x 27 cm, Musée d'Orsay, Paris

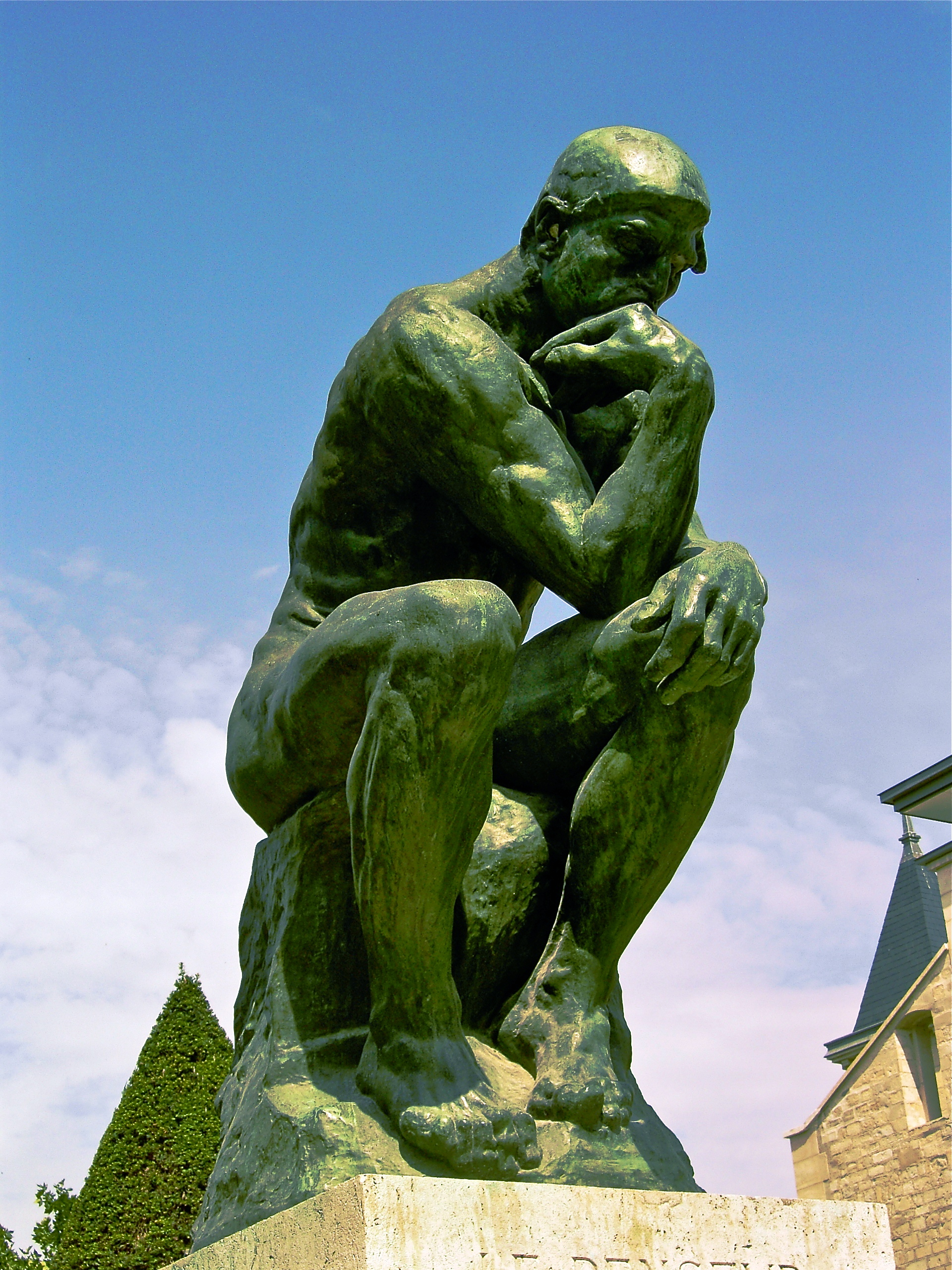
Auguste Rodin, The Thinker, 1902, Musée Rodin, Paris

Constantin Brâncuși, 1907–08, The Kiss, Exhibited at the Armory Show and published in the Chicago Tribune, 25 March 1913

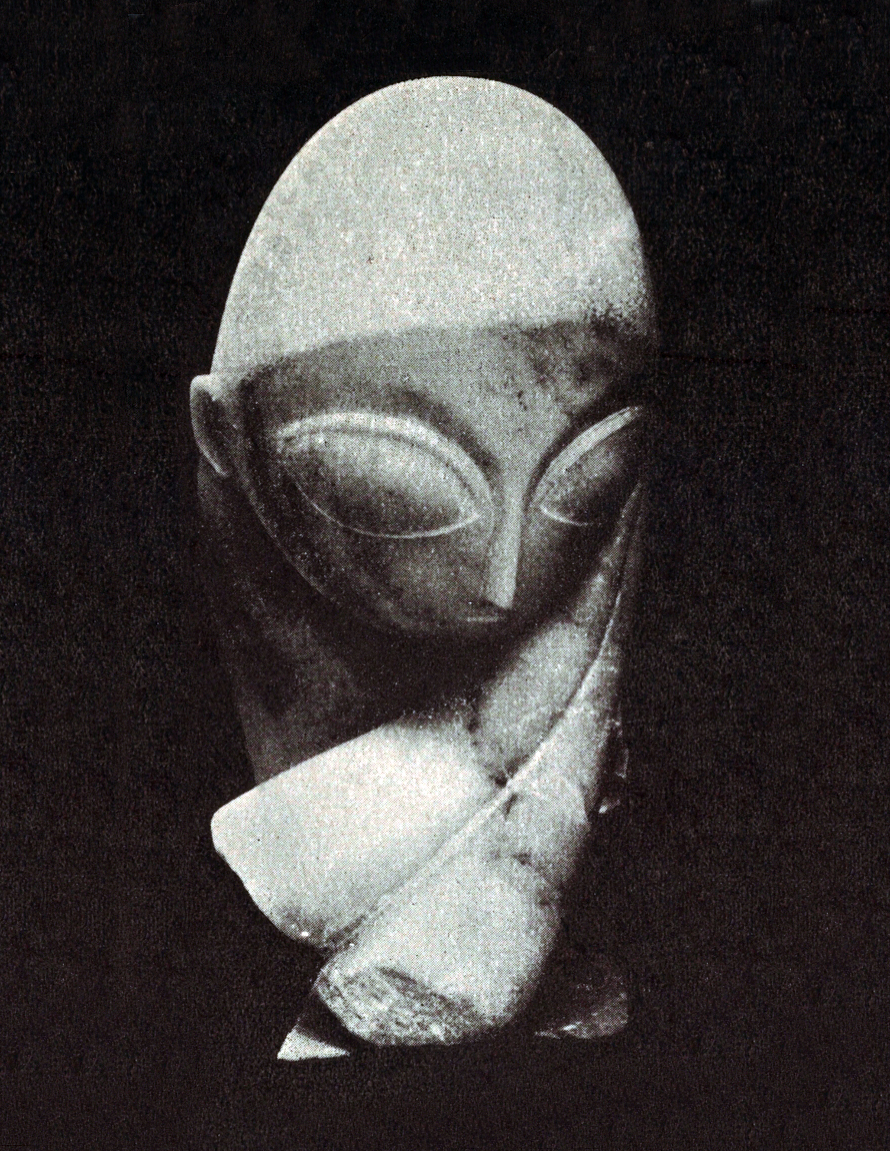
Constantin Brâncuși, Portrait of Mademoiselle Pogany, 1912, White marble; limestone block, Philadelphia Museum of Art, exhibited at the 1913 Armory Show

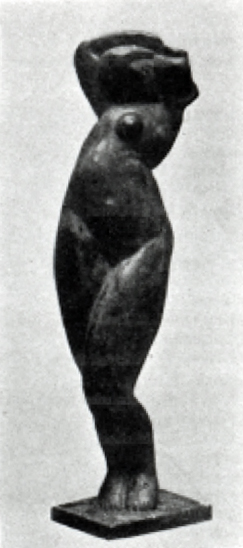
Alexander Archipenko, 1910–11, Negress (La Negresse), Armory Show catalogue photo

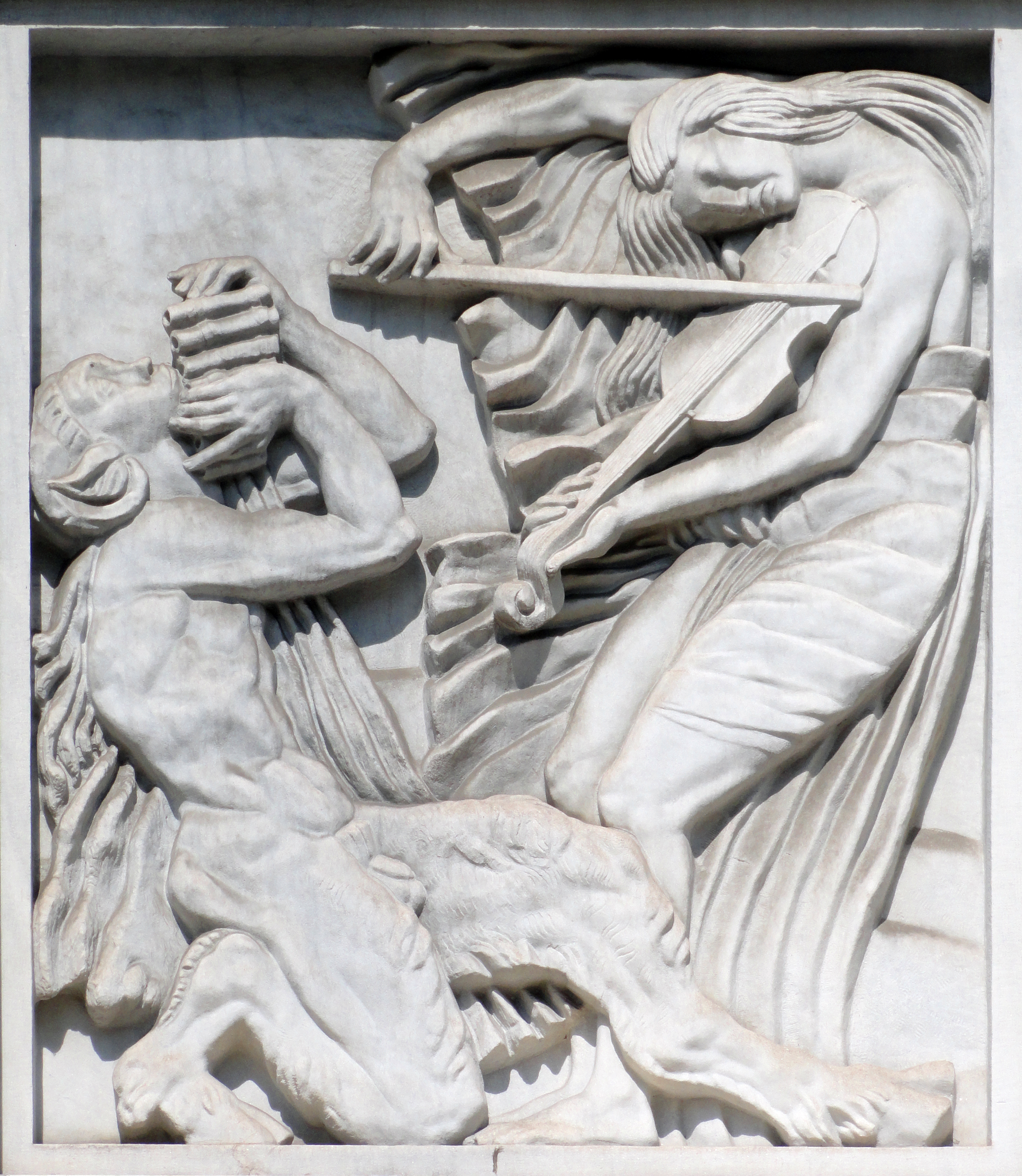
Antoine Bourdelle, 1910–12, La Musique, bas-relief, Théâtre des Champs-Élysées, Paris

Joseph Csaky, 1911–1912, Groupe de femmes (Groupe de trois femmes, Groupe de trois personnages), plaster lost, Exhibited at the 1912 Salon d'Automne, and Salon des Indépendants, 1913, Paris

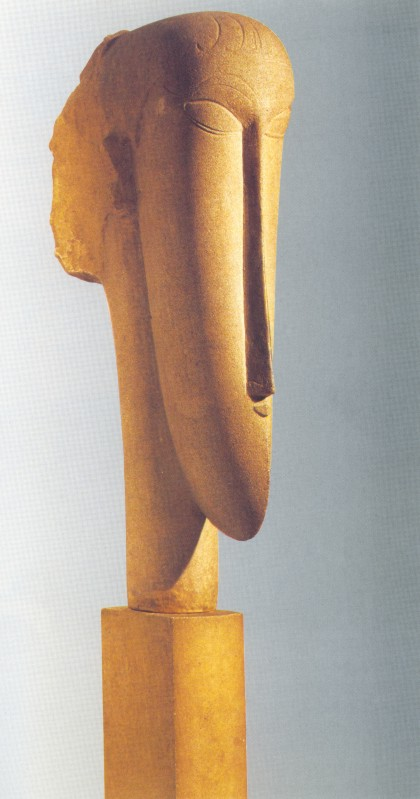
Amedeo Modigliani, Female Head, 1911/1912, Tate. Paul Guillaume, introduced Modigliani to Constantin Brâncuși. He was Brâncuși's disciple for a year.

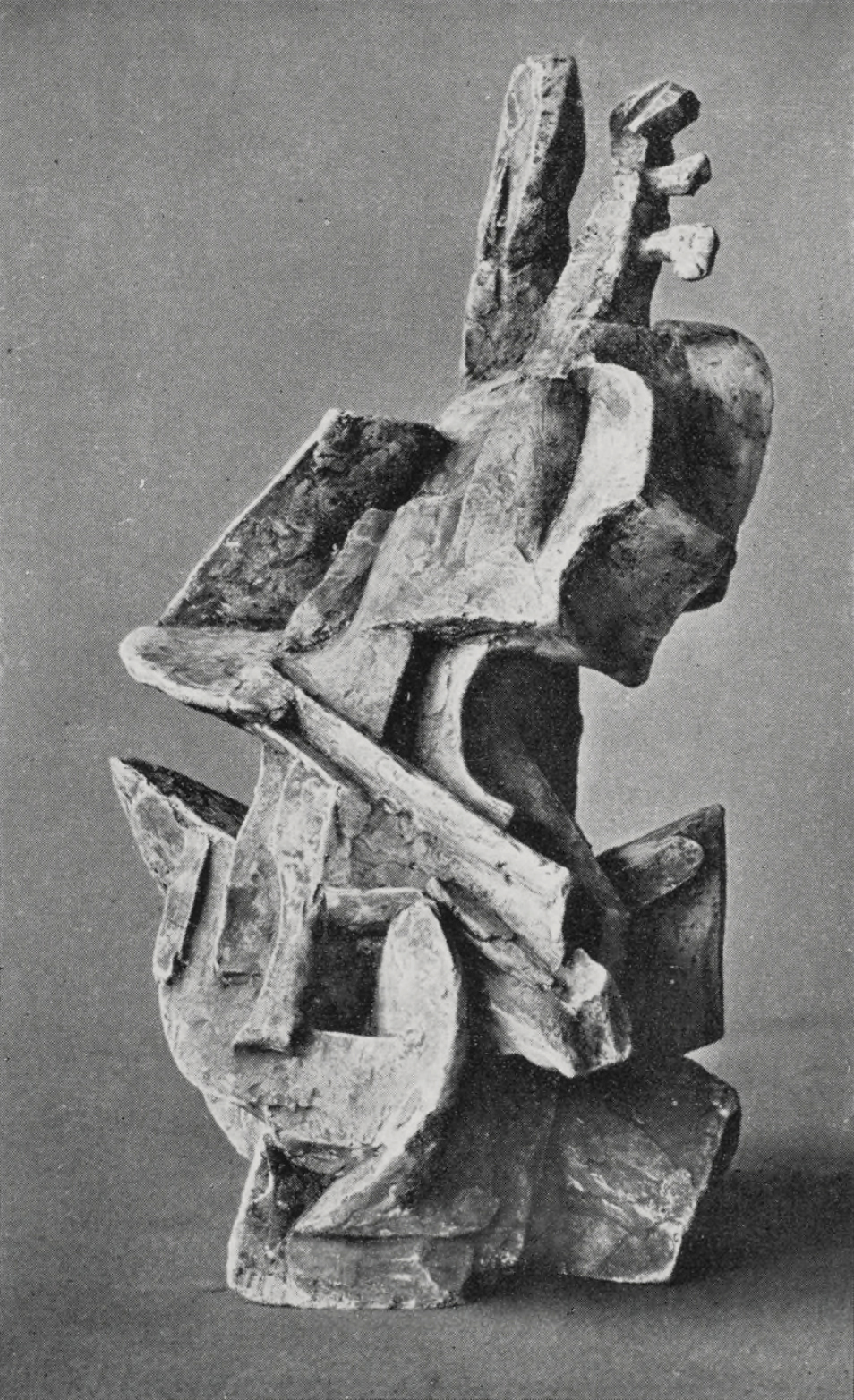
Otto Gutfreund, Violoncelliste (Cellist), 1912–13

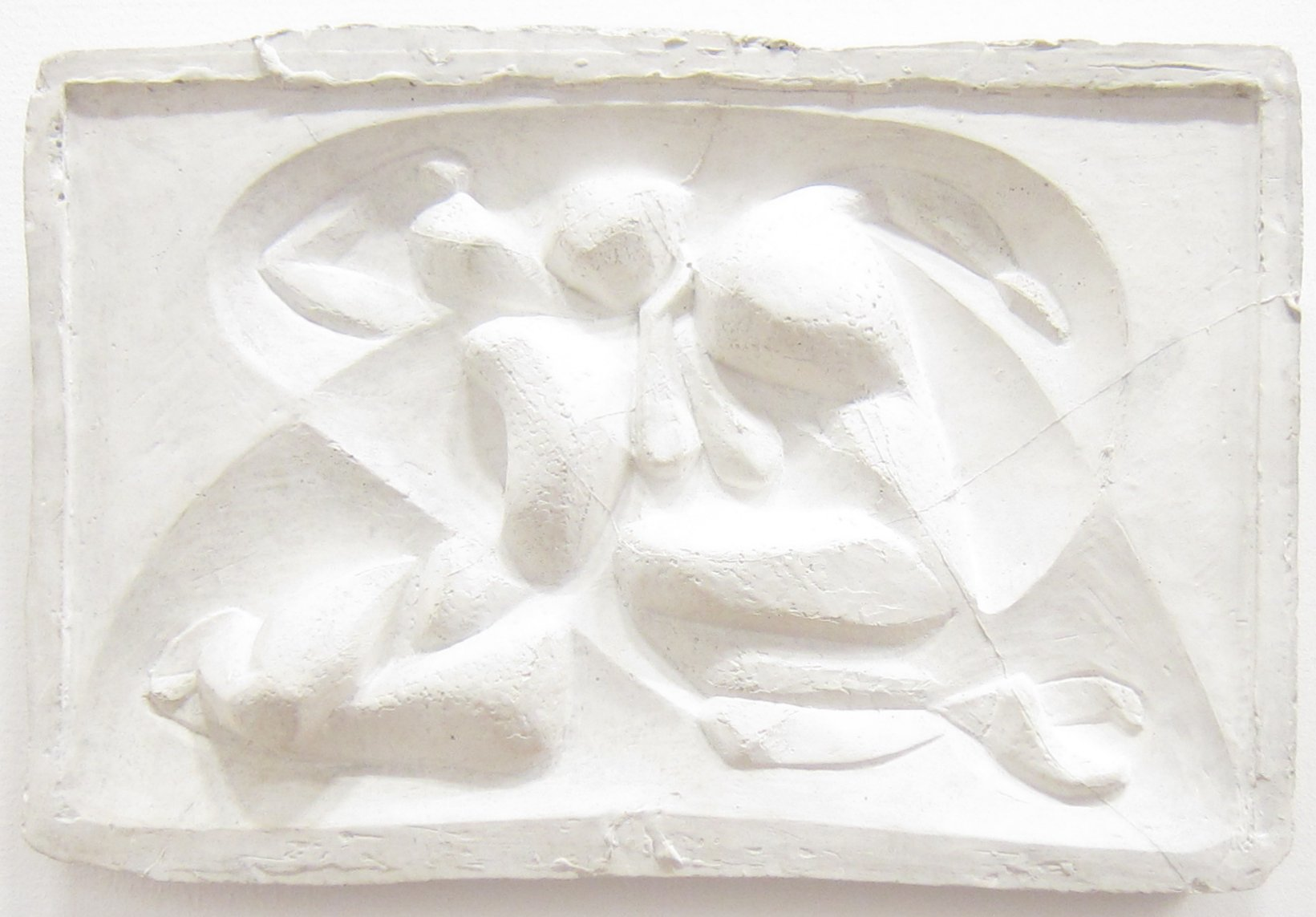
Raymond Duchamp-Villon, 1913, Les amants II, Musée national d'art moderne, Paris

Henri Gaudier-Brzeska, 1914, Boy with a Coney (Boy with a rabbit), marble

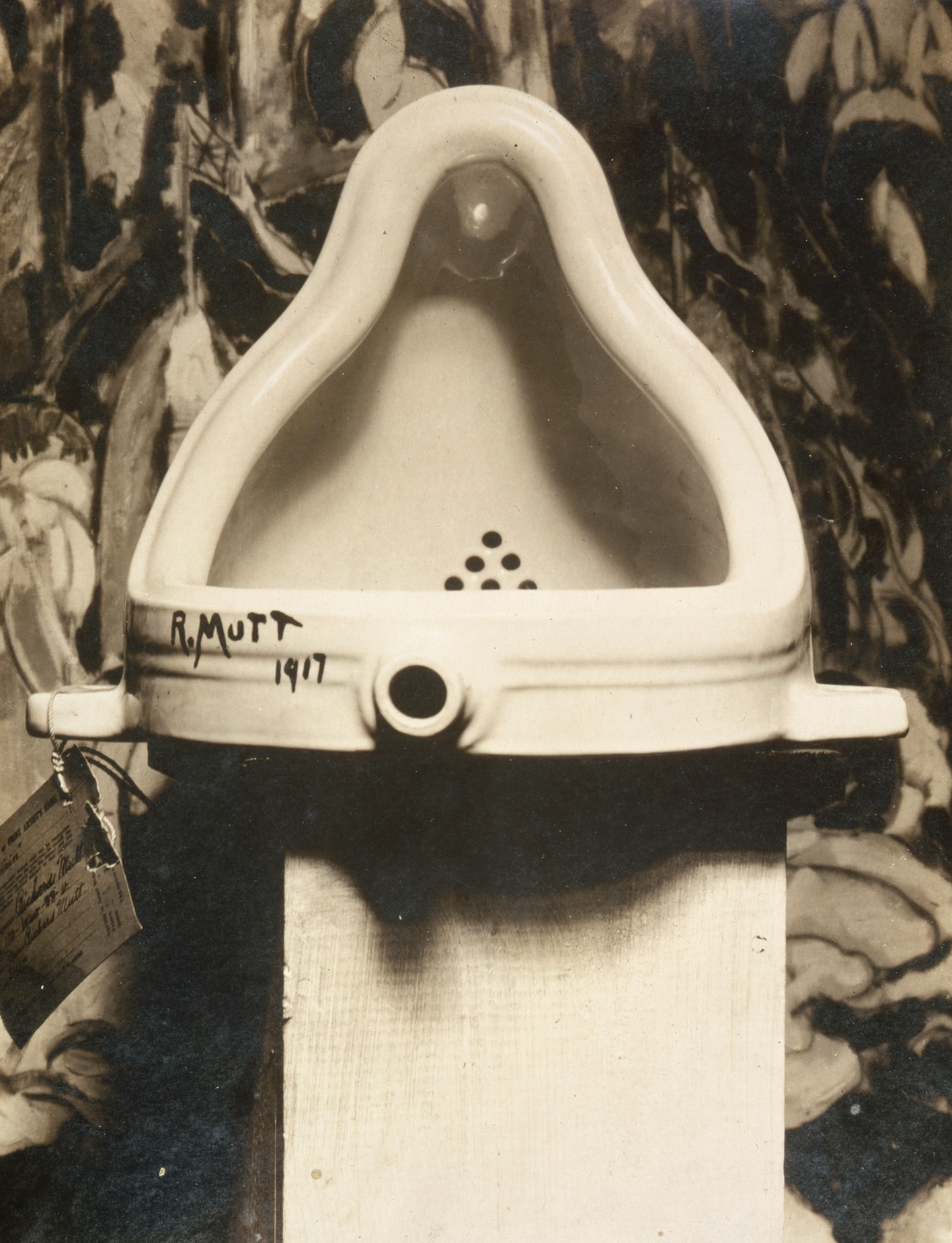
Marcel Duchamp, Fountain, 1917, photograph by Alfred Stieglitz

Joseph Csaky, Tête, ca.1920 (front and side view), limestone, 60 cm, Kröller-Müller Museum, Otterlo, Netherlands

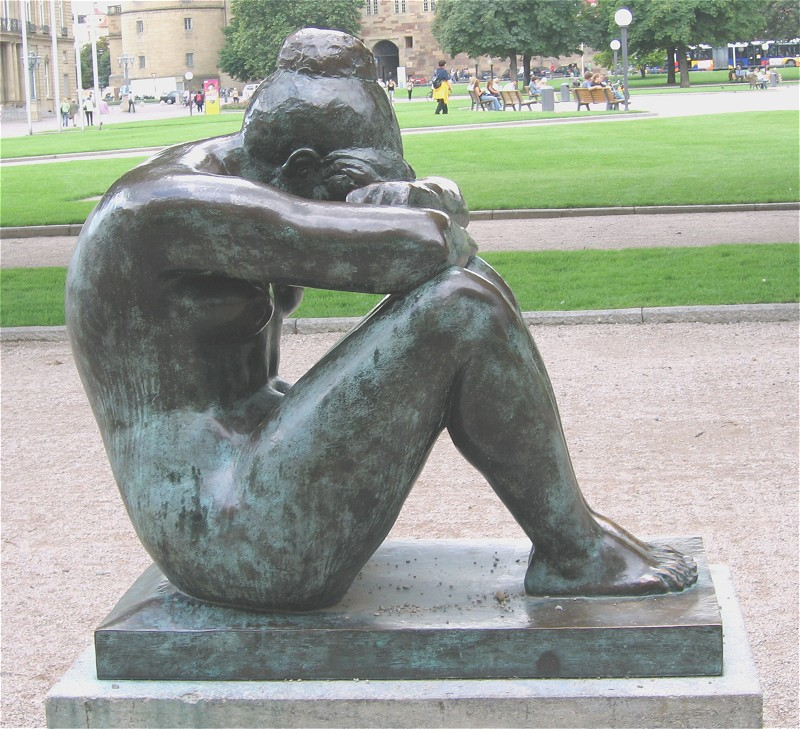
Aristide Maillol, The Night, 1920, Stuttgart

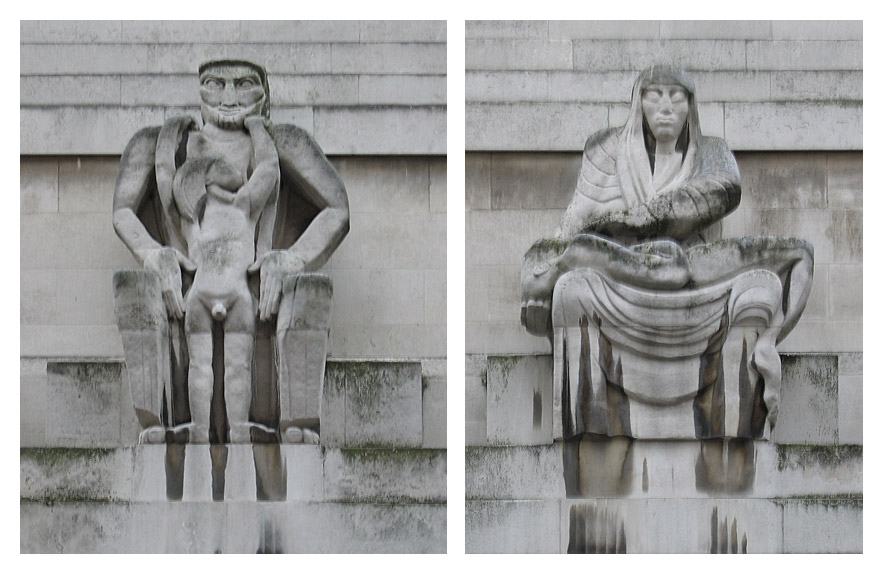
Jacob Epstein, Day and Night, carved for the London Underground's headquarters, 1928.

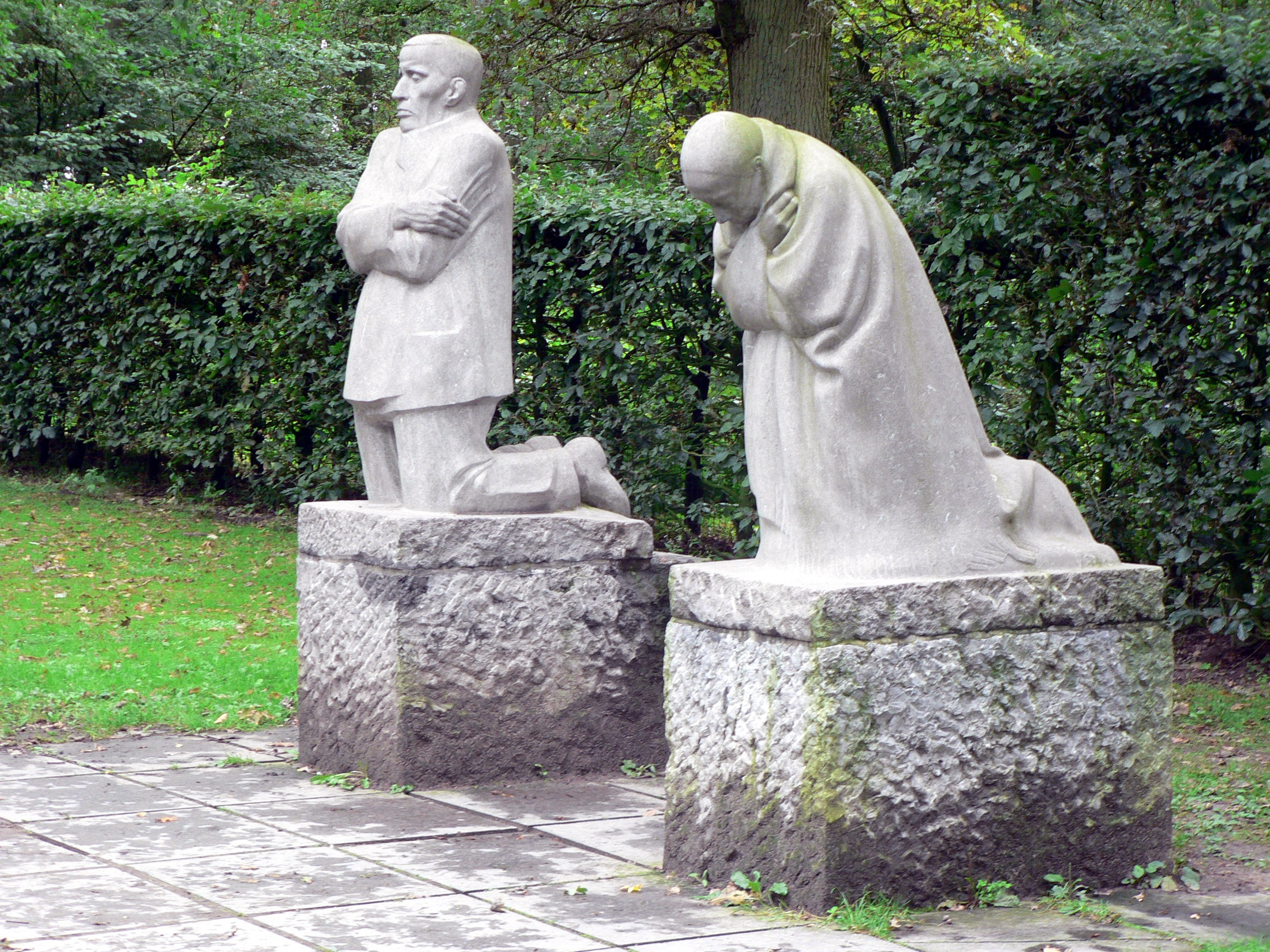
Käthe Kollwitz, The Grieving Parents, 1932, World War I memorial (for her son Peter), Vladslo German war cemetery

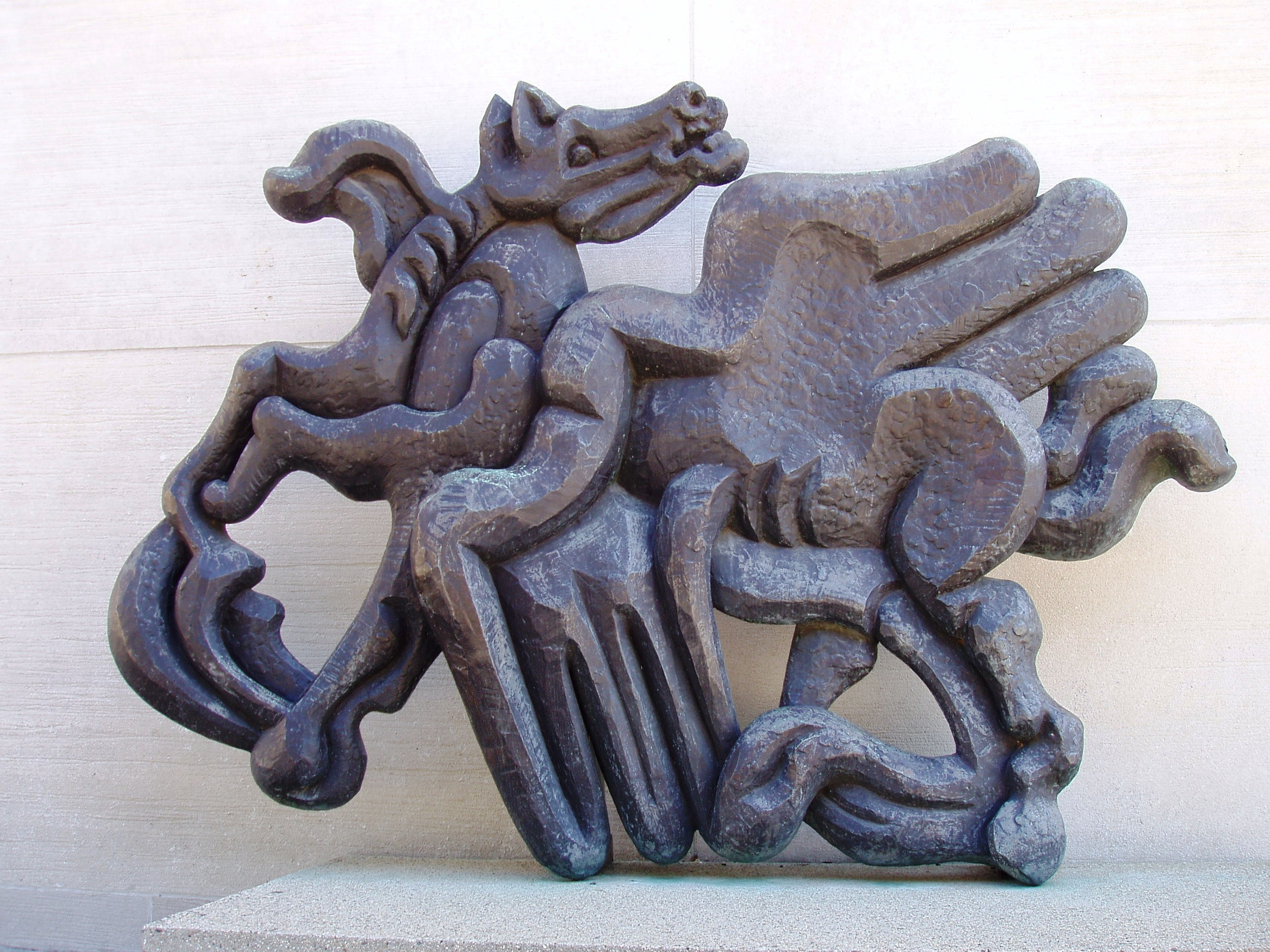
Jacques Lipchitz, Birth of the Muses, (1944–1950)

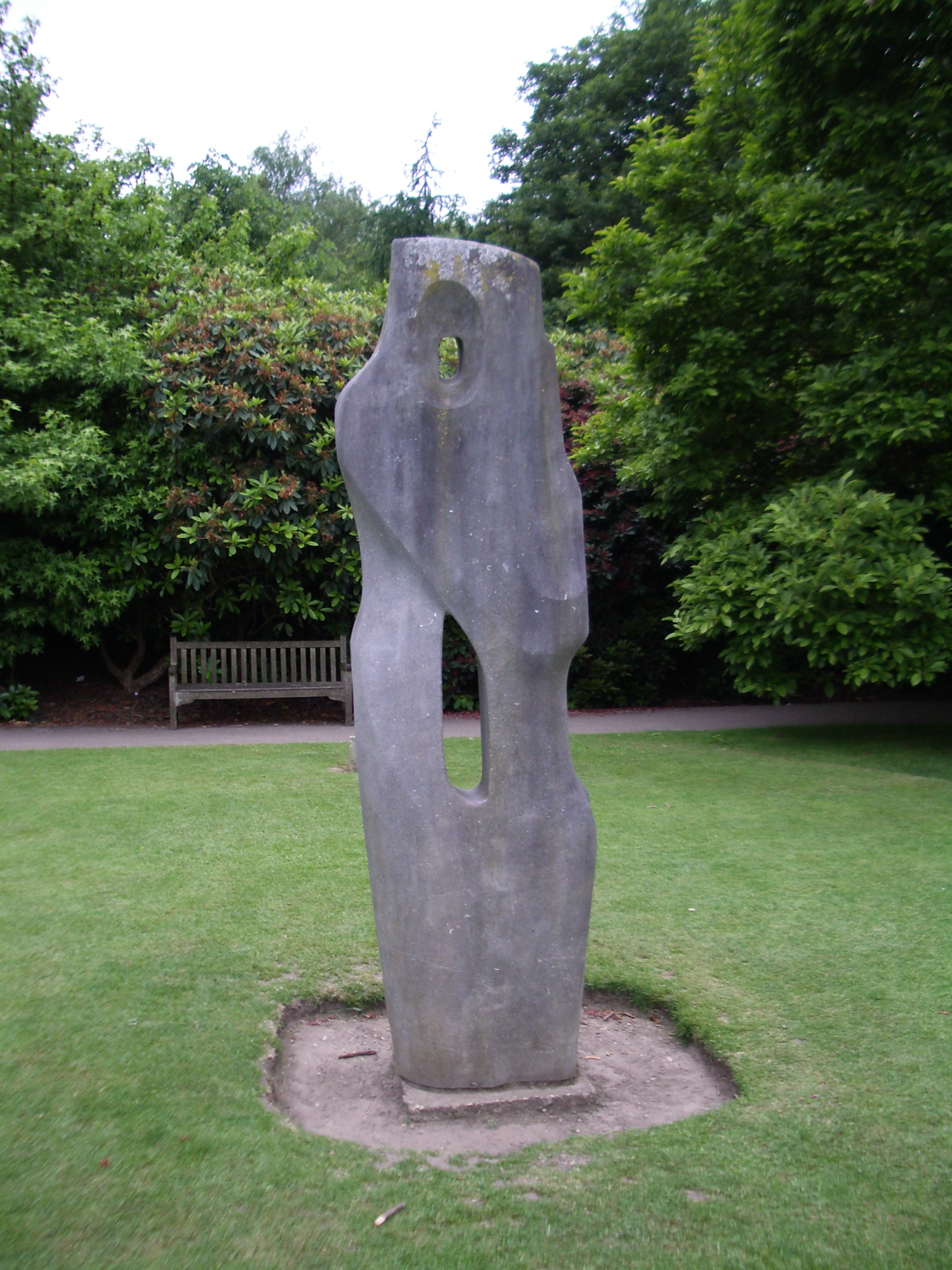
Barbara Hepworth, Monolith-Empyrean, 1953

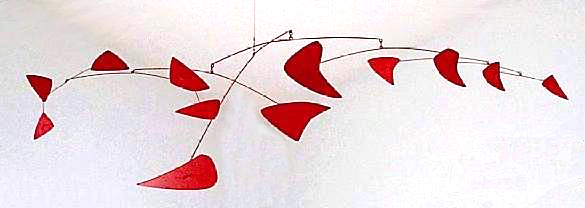
Alexander Calder, Red Mobile, 1956, Painted sheet metal and metal rods, Montreal Museum of Fine Arts

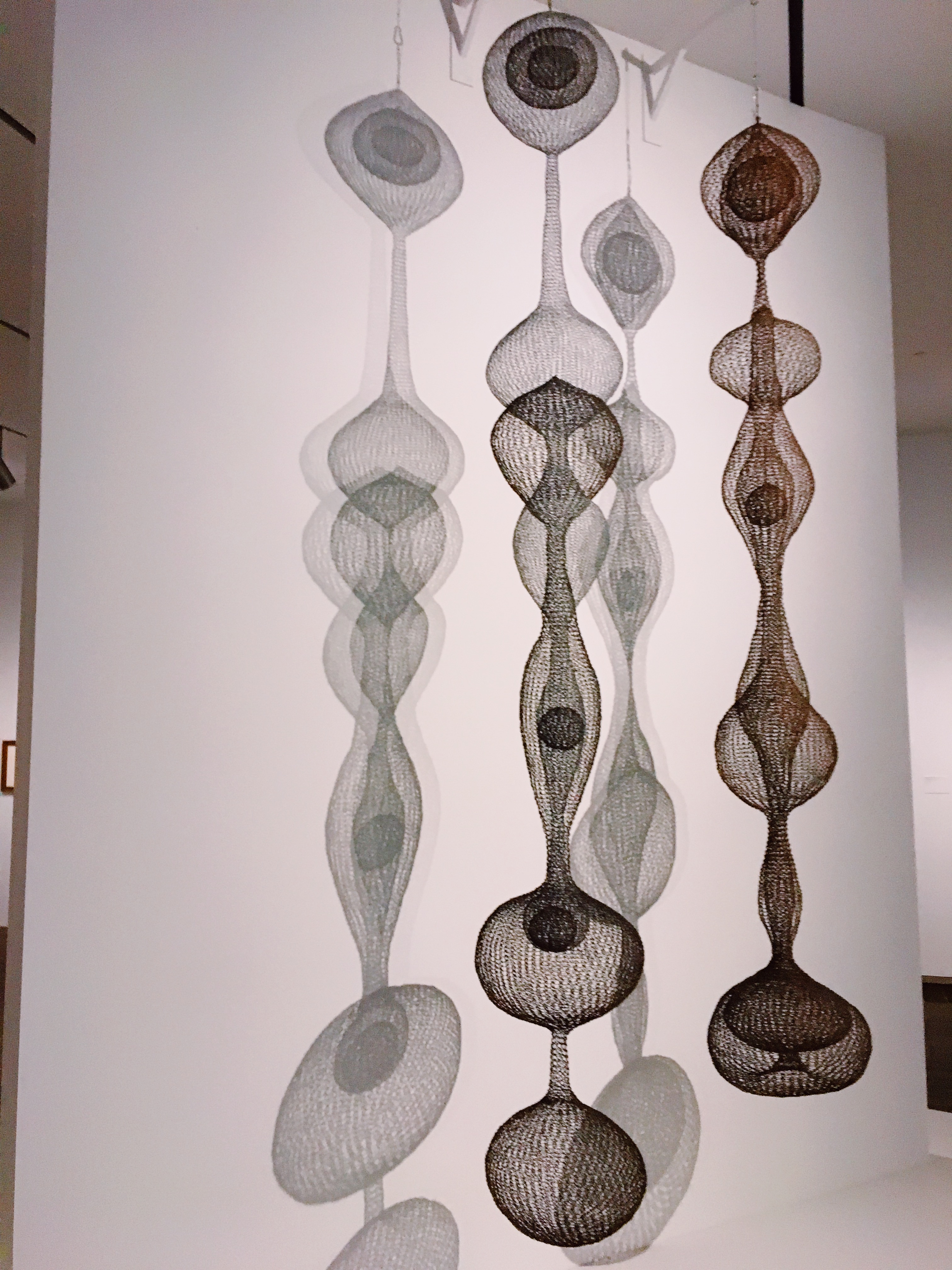
Ruth Asawa, Untitled (1950s-60s; exact date unknown) at the DeYoung Museum in San Francisco.

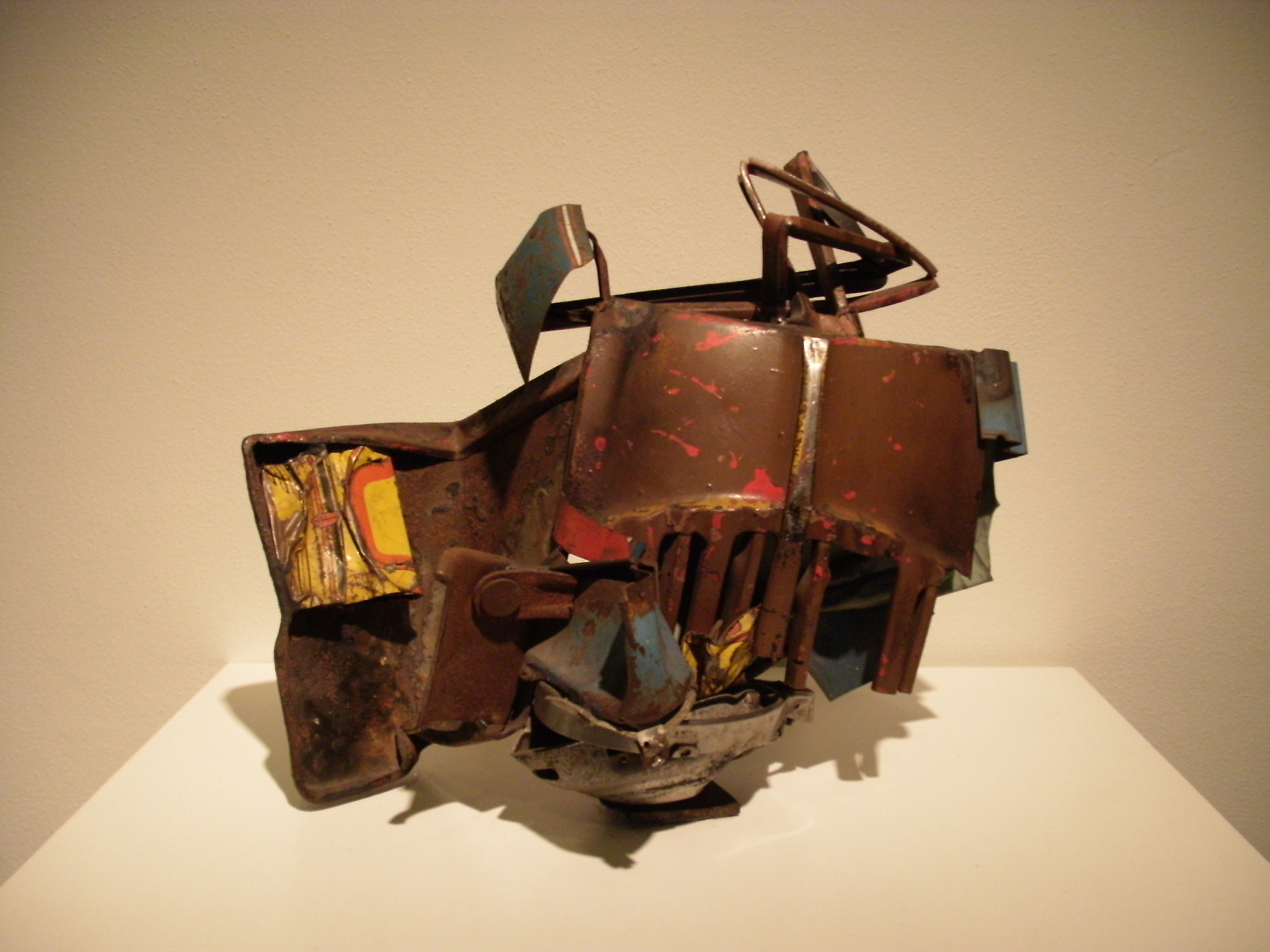
John Chamberlain, S, 1959, Hirshhorn Museum and Sculpture Garden, Washington, DC.

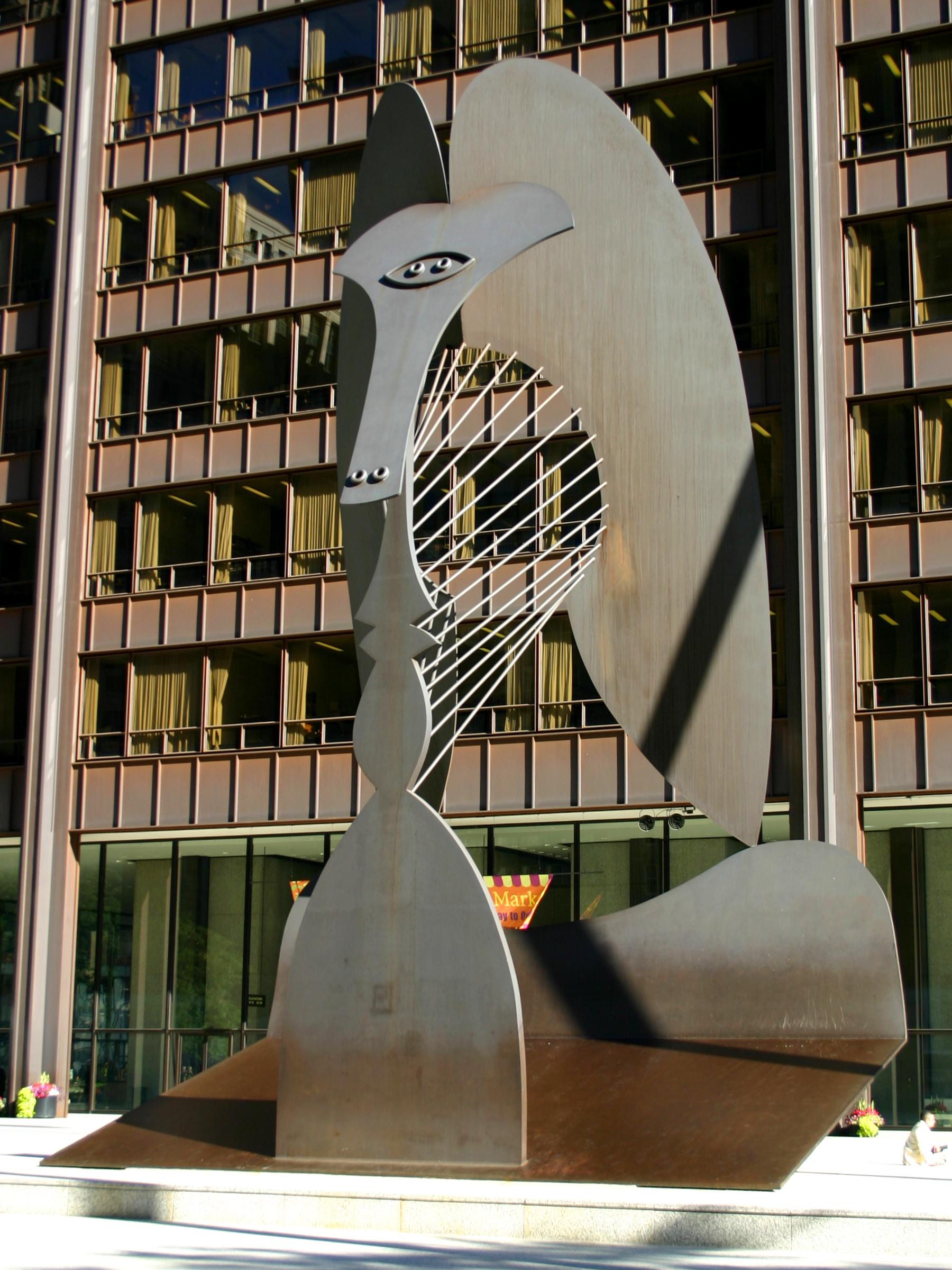
Pablo Picasso, Public Sculpture, 1967, Chicago, Illinois

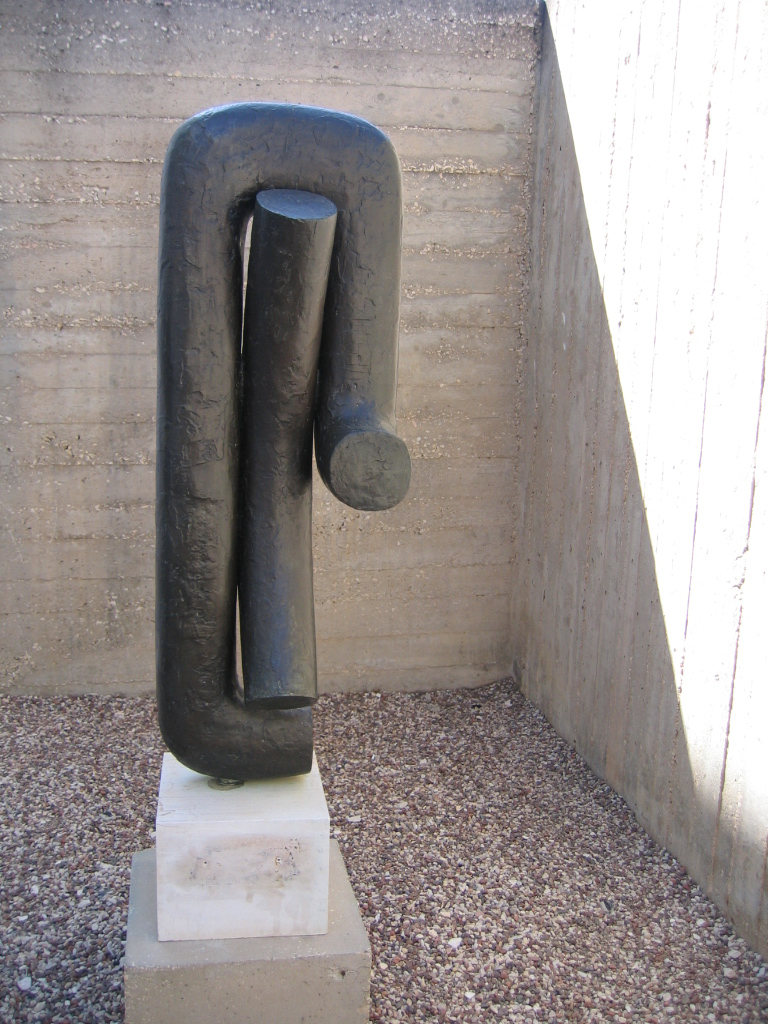
Isamu Noguchi, Heimar, 1968, at the Billy Rose Sculpture Garden, Israel Museum, Jerusalem, Israel

George Rickey, Four Squares in Geviert, 1969, terrace of the New National Gallery, Berlin, Germany, Rickey is considered a Kinetic sculptor

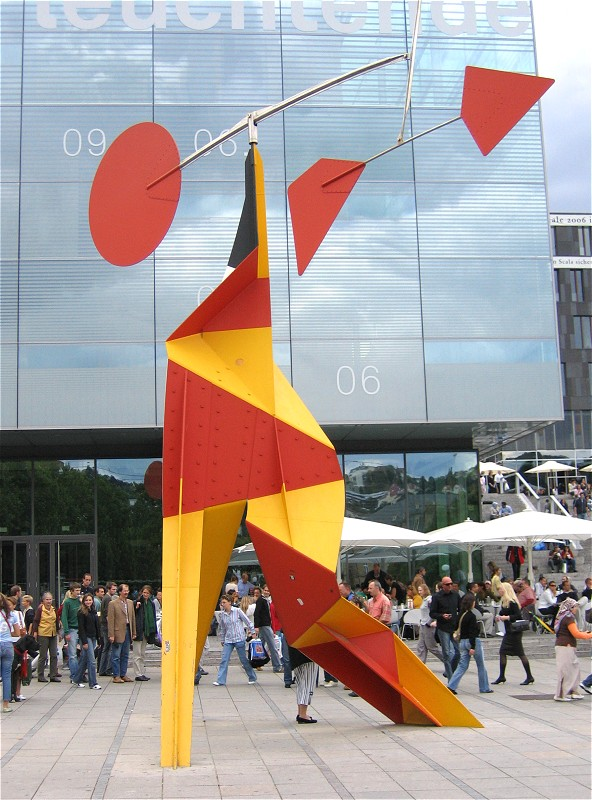
Alexander Calder, Crinkly avec disc rouge, 1973, Schlossplatz, Stuttgart

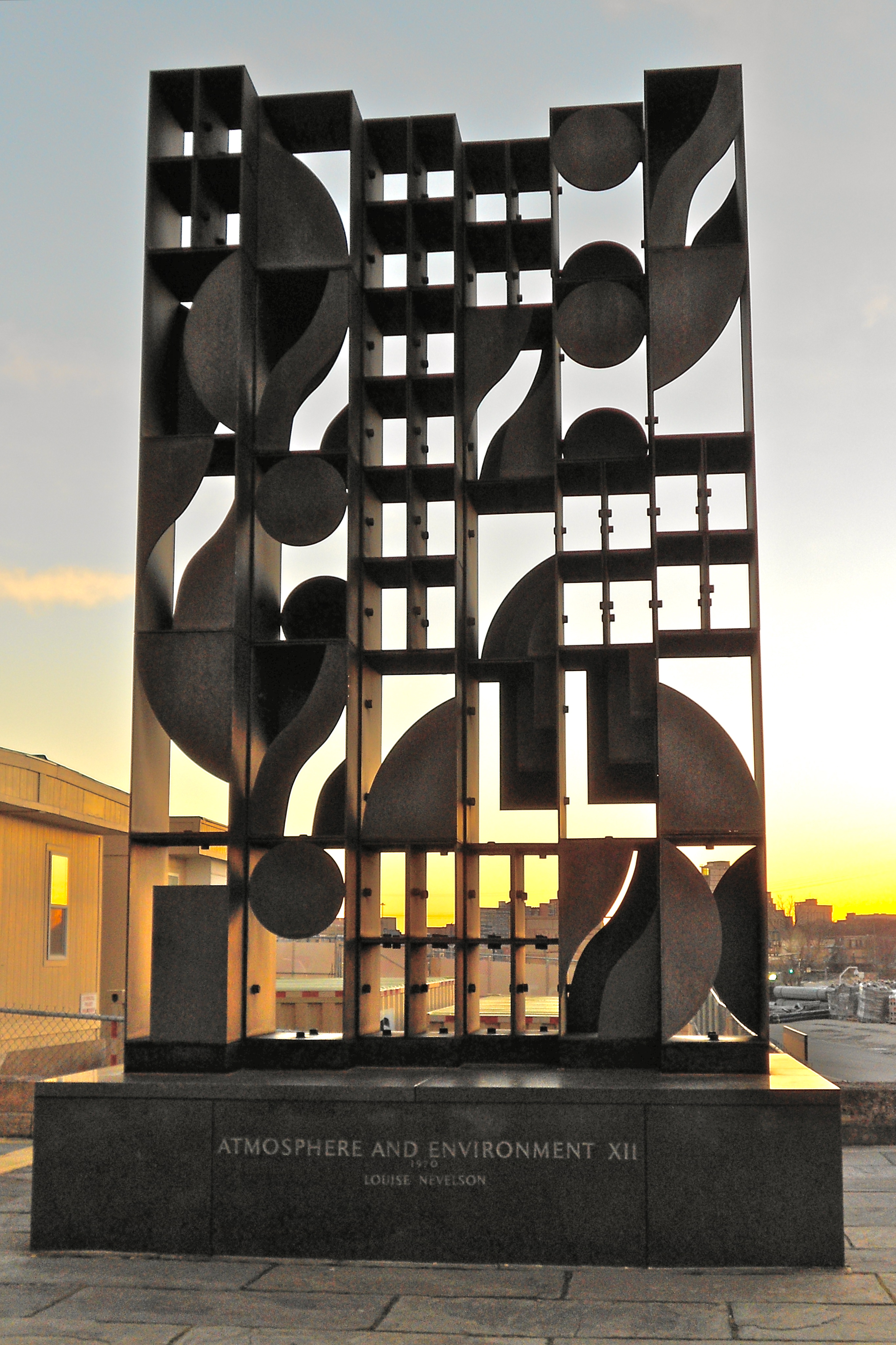
Louise Nevelson, Atmosphere and Environment XII, 1970–1973, Philadelphia Museum of Art

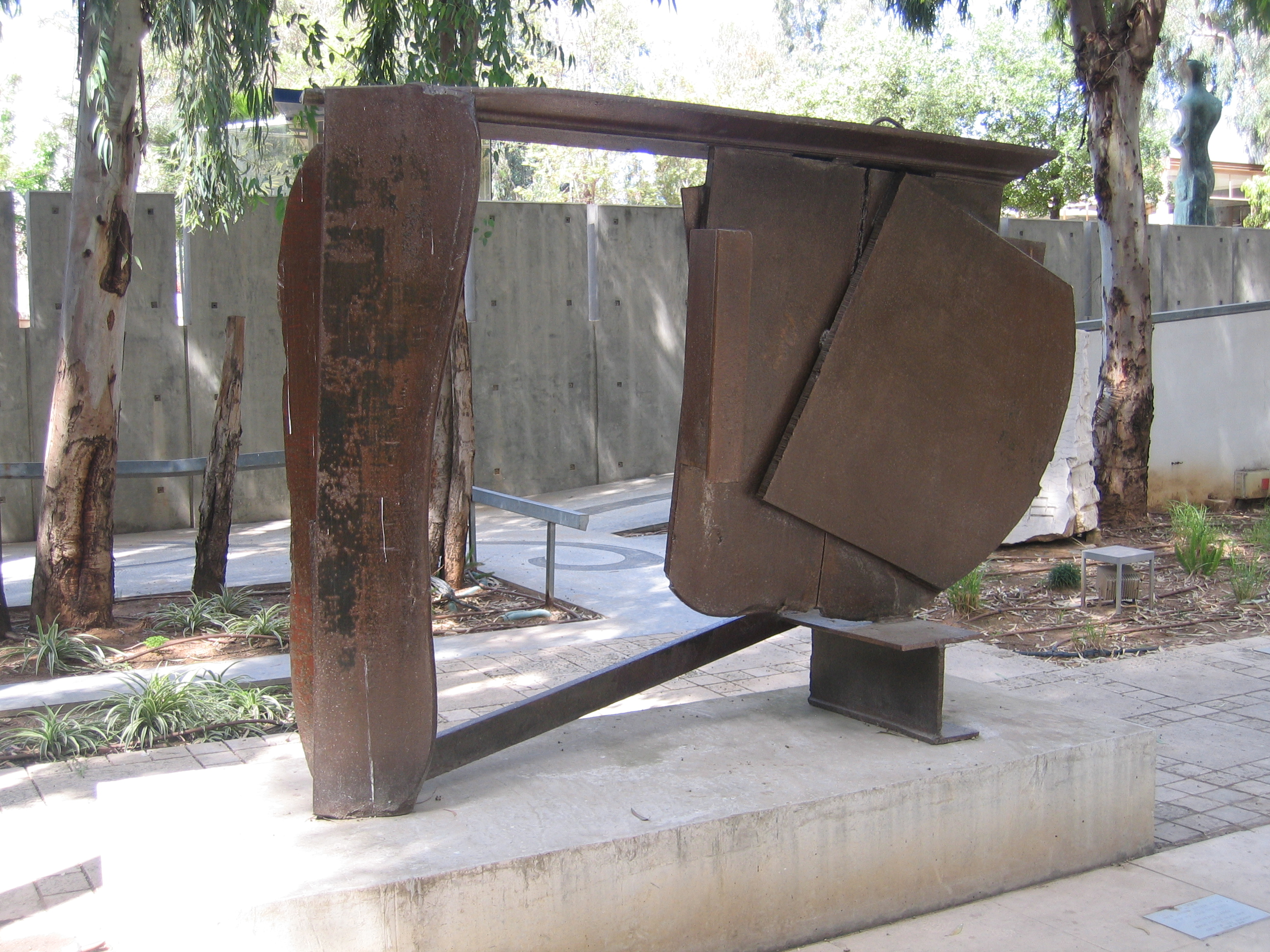
Sir Anthony Caro, Black Cover Flat, 1974, steel, Tel Aviv Museum of Art

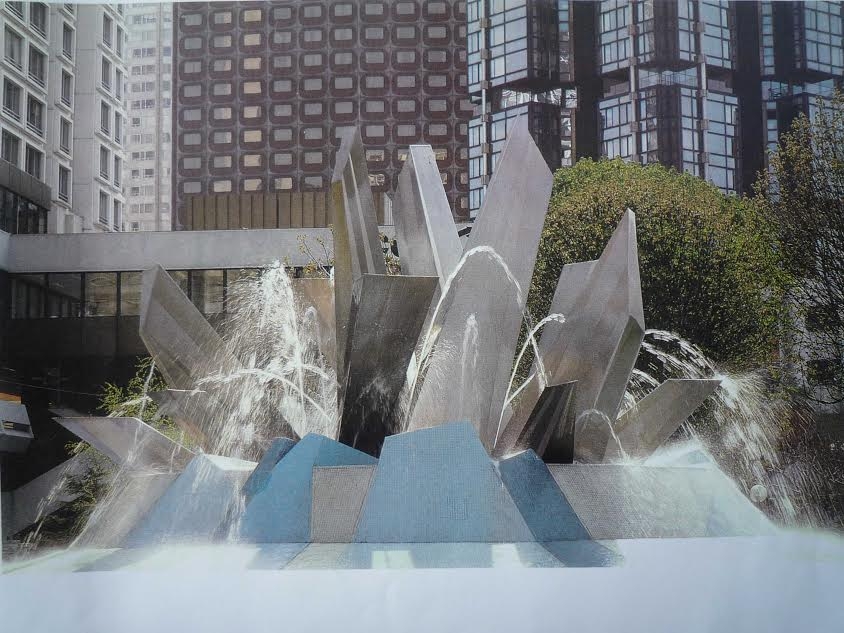
Jean-Yves Lechevallier, Cristaux, Homage to Béla Bartók, Paris, 1980

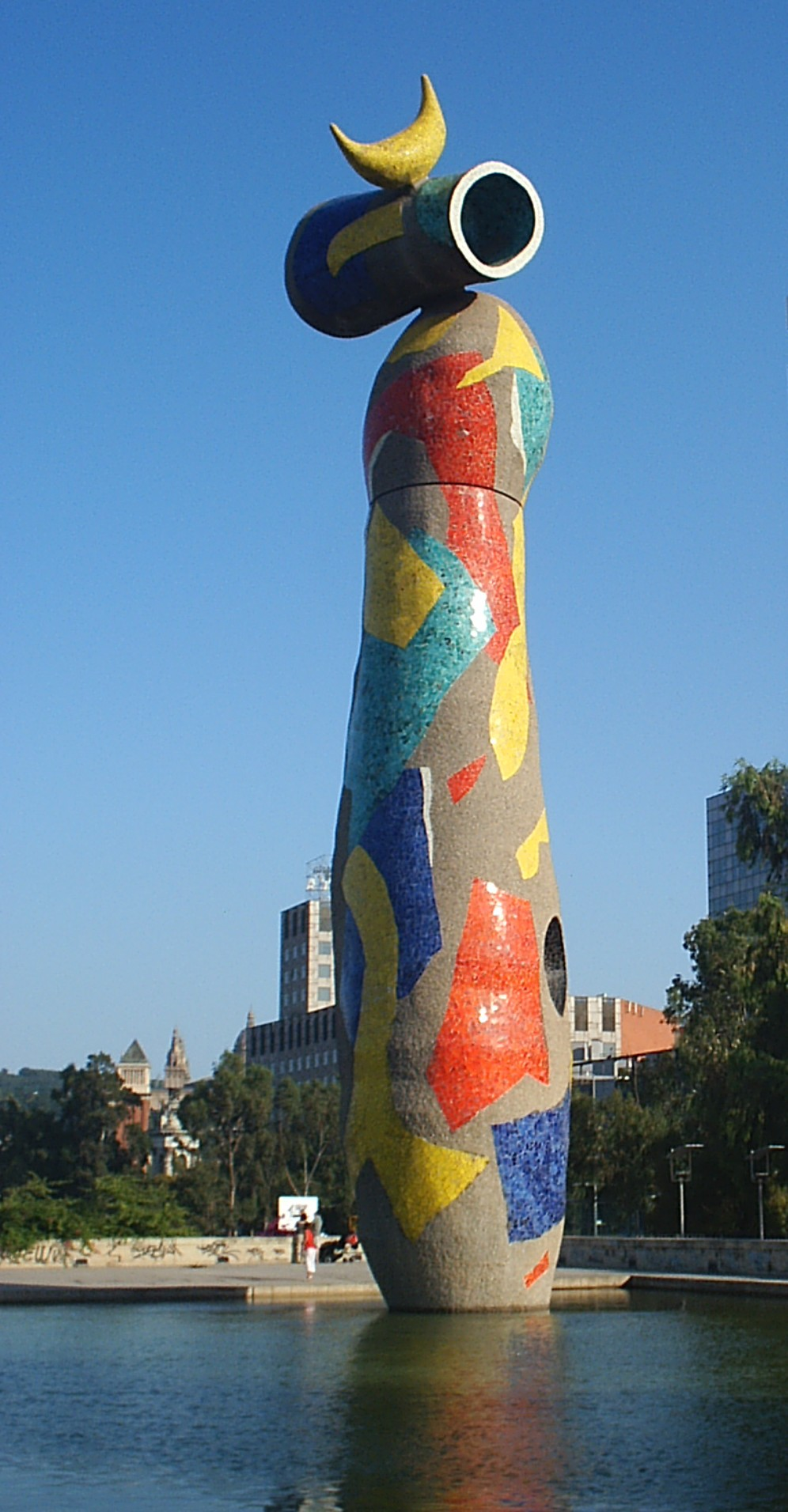
Joan Miró, Woman and Bird, 1982, Barcelona, Spain

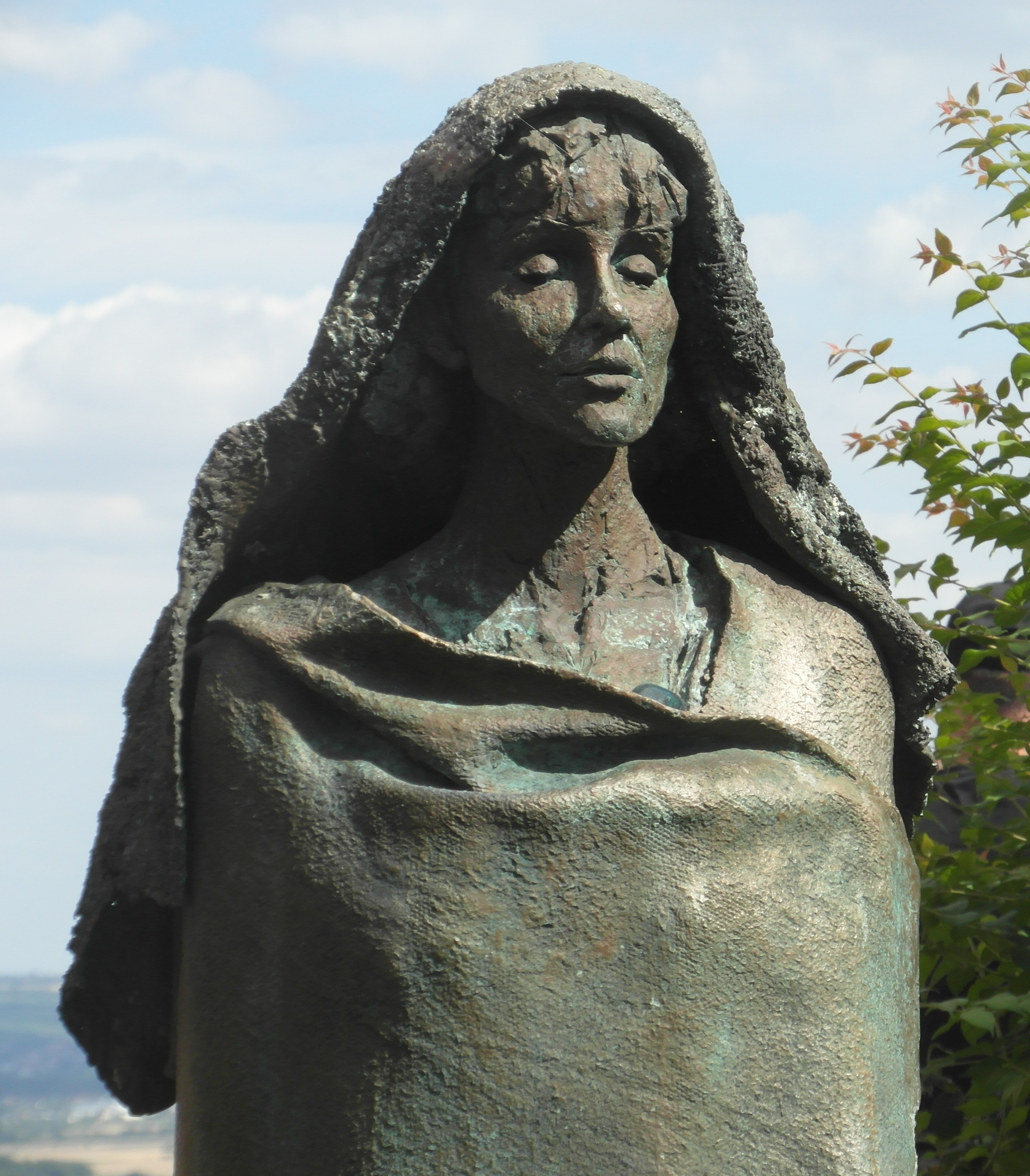
Karlheinz Oswald, Hildegard of Bingen, 1998, bronze, in front of Eibingen Abbey

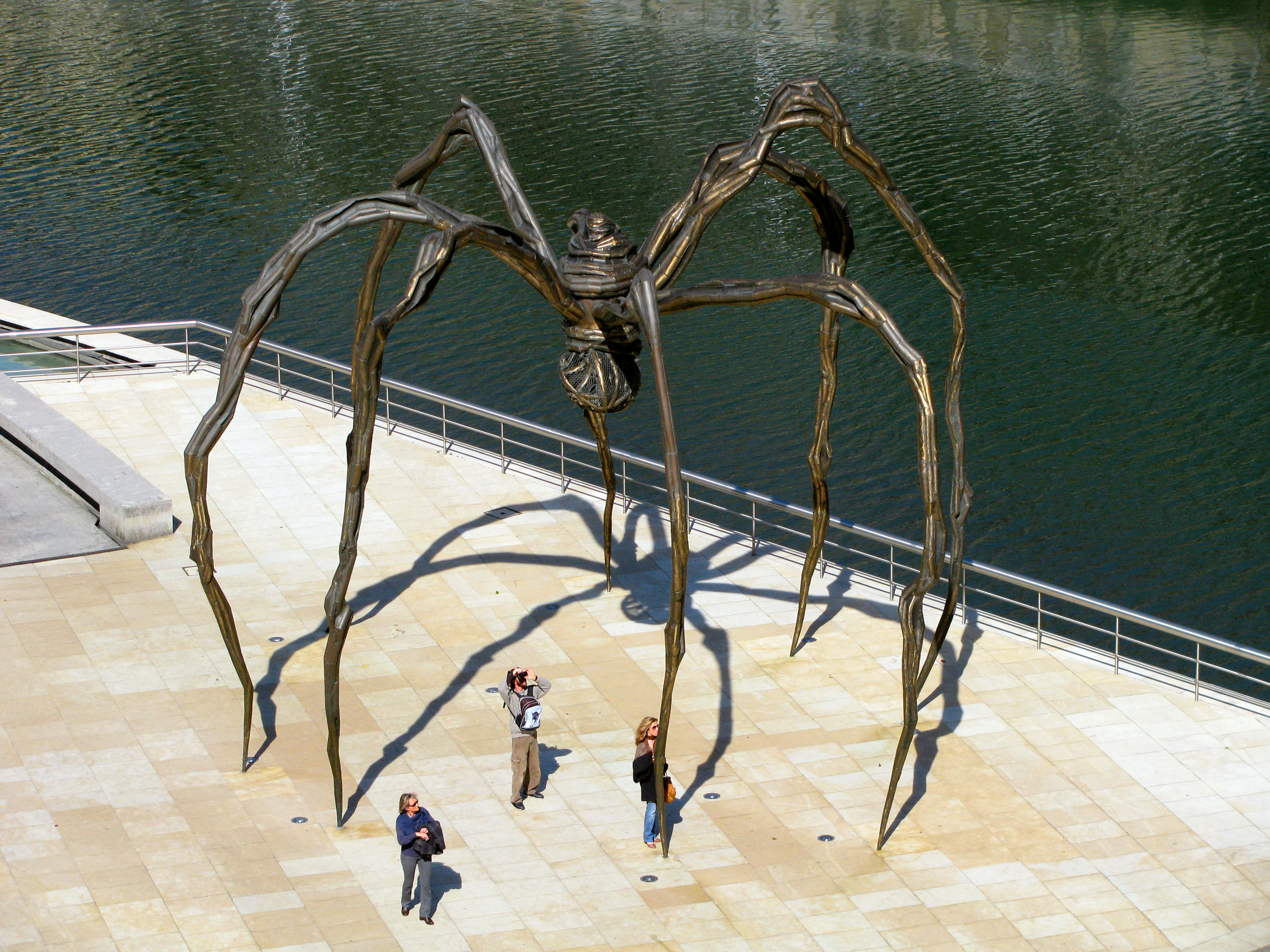
Louise Bourgeois, Maman, 1999, outside Museo Guggenheim

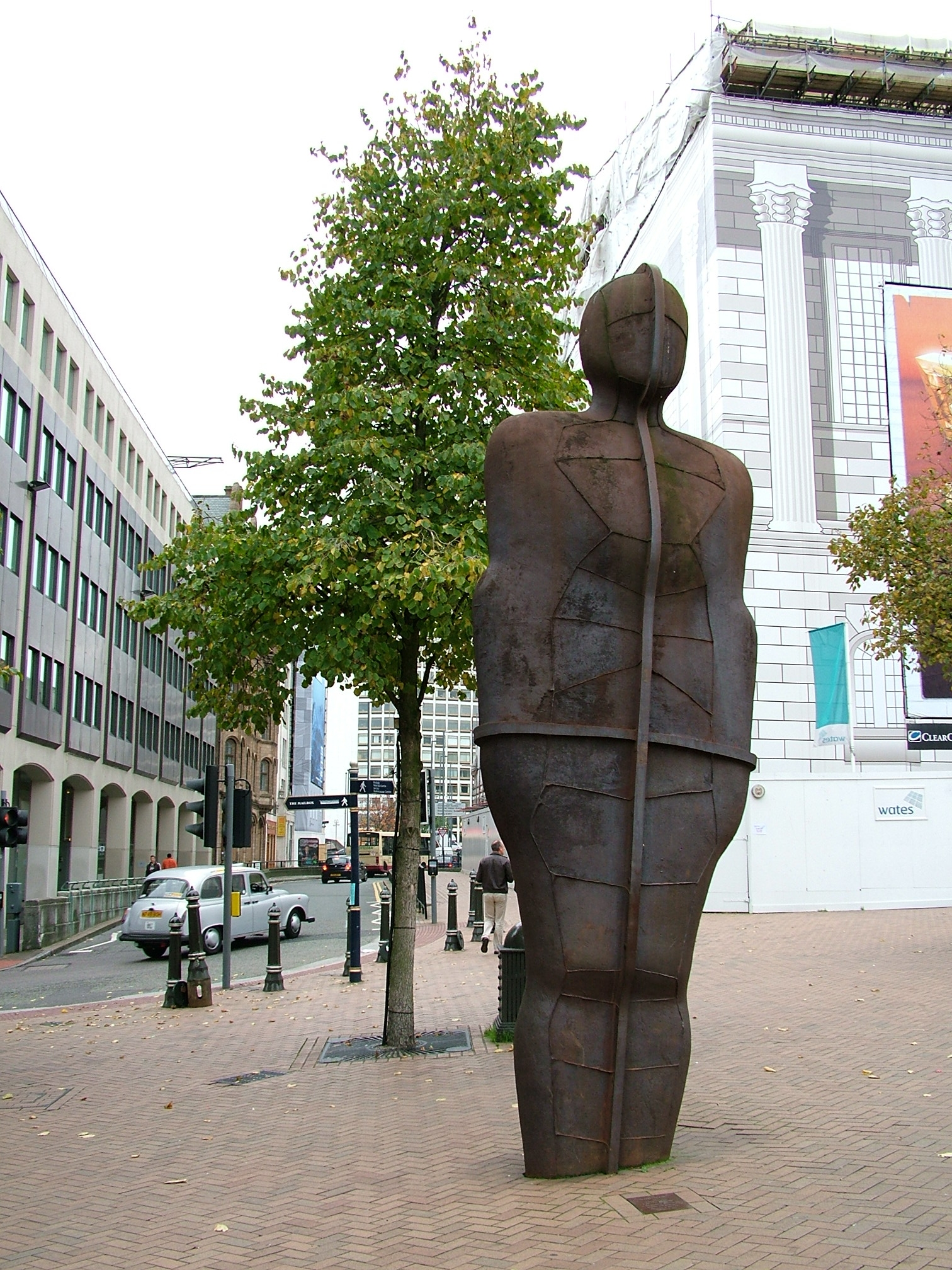
Antony Gormley, Iron: Man, 2005, in Victoria Square, Birmingham

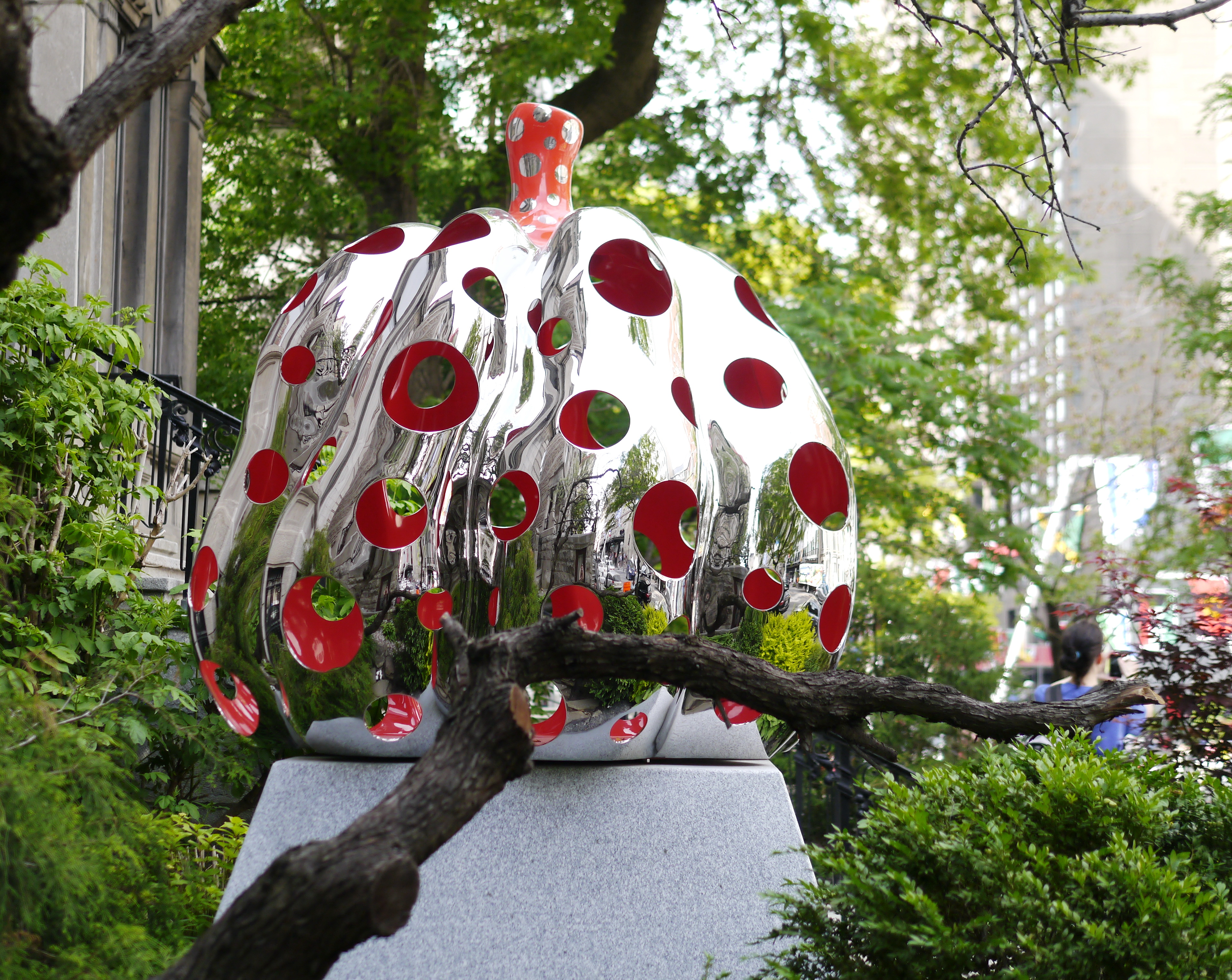
Yayoi Kusama, Pumpkin, 2015, in Montreal.

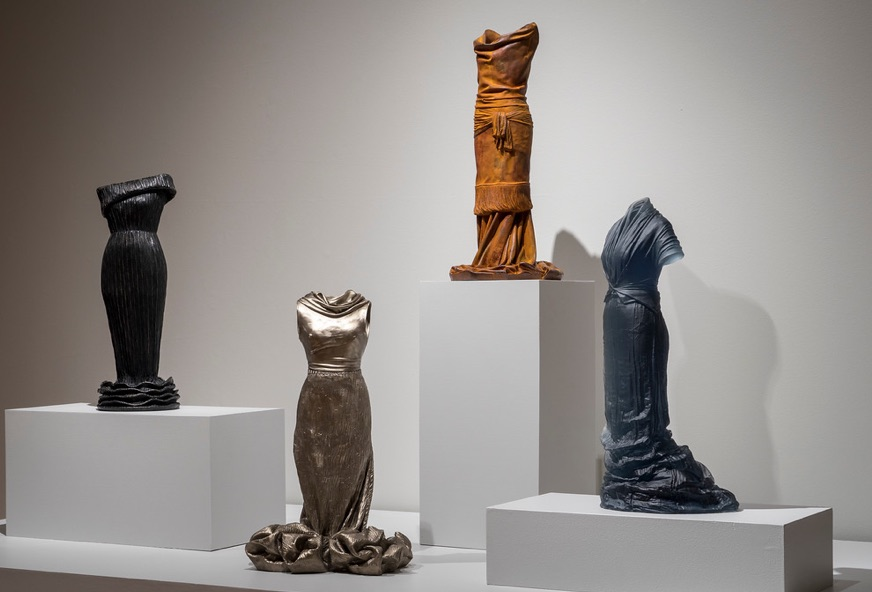
Karen LaMonte, Etudes, 2017, at the Hunter Museum of Art in Tennessee.

=== Contemporary movements ===
Site specific and environmental art works are represented by artists: Andy Goldsworthy, Walter De Maria, Richard Long, Richard Serra, Robert Irwin, George Rickey, and Christo and Jeanne-Claude-led contemporary abstract sculpture in new directions. Artists created environmental sculpture on expansive sites in the "land art in the American West" group of projects. These land art or "earth art" environmental scale sculpture works exemplified by artists such as Robert Smithson, Michael Heizer, James Turrell (Roden Crater). Eva Hesse, Sol LeWitt, Jackie Winsor, Keith Sonnier, and Bruce Nauman, among others were pioneers of Postminimalist sculpture.

Also during the 1960s and 1970s artists as diverse as Eduardo Paolozzi, Chryssa, Walter De Maria, Claes Oldenburg, George Segal, Edward Kienholz, Nam June Paik, Wolf Vostell, Duane Hanson, and John DeAndrea explored abstraction, imagery, and figuration through video art, environment, light sculpture, and installation art in new ways.

Conceptual art is art in which the concept(s) or idea(s) involved in the work take precedence over traditional aesthetic and material concerns. Works include One and Three Chairs, 1965, by Joseph Kosuth, and An Oak Tree, 1973, by Michael Craig-Martin, and those of Joseph Beuys and James Turrell among others.

Postmodern sculpture occupies a broader field of activities than Modernist sculpture. Rosalind Krauss identified sculpture in the expanded field, a series of oppositions around the work's relationship to its environment that describe the various sculpture-like activities that are postmodern sculpture, creating a theoretical explanation that could adequately fit the developments of Land art, Minimalist sculpture, and site-specific art into the category of "sculpture":

- Site-Construction: the intersection of landscape and architecture
- Axiomatic Structures: the combination of architecture and not-architecture
- Marked sites: the combination of landscape and not-landscape
- Sculpture: intersection of not-landscape and not-architecture
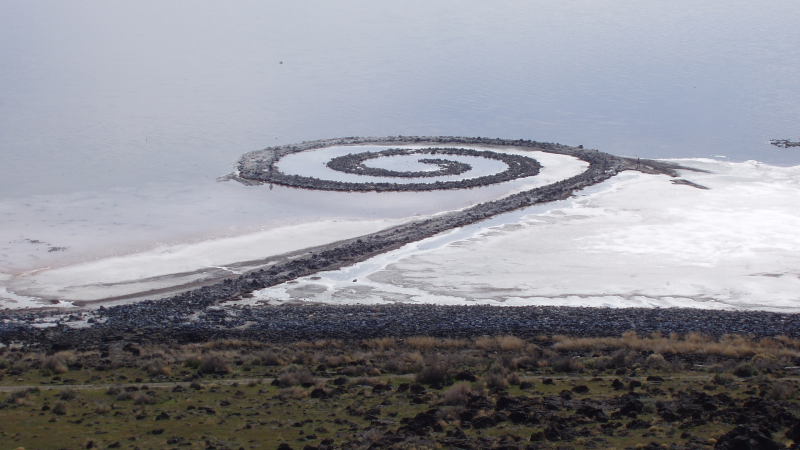
Spiral Jetty by Robert Smithson from atop Rozel Point, in mid-April 2005

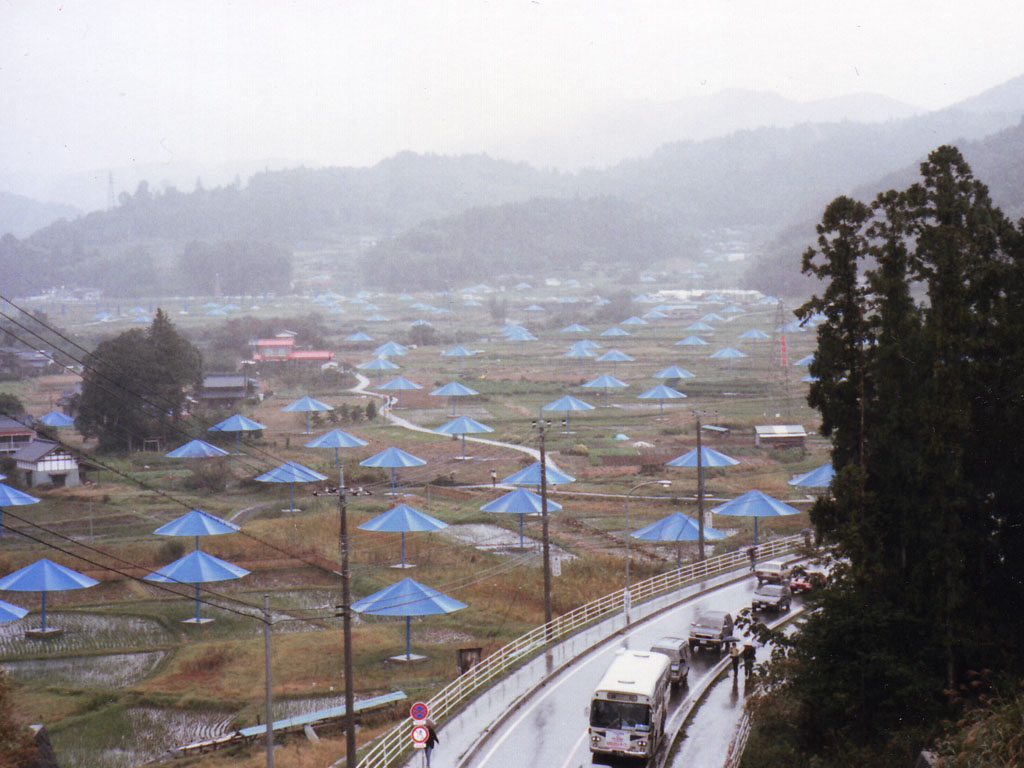
Christo and Jeanne-Claude, Umbrellas 1991, (Japan)

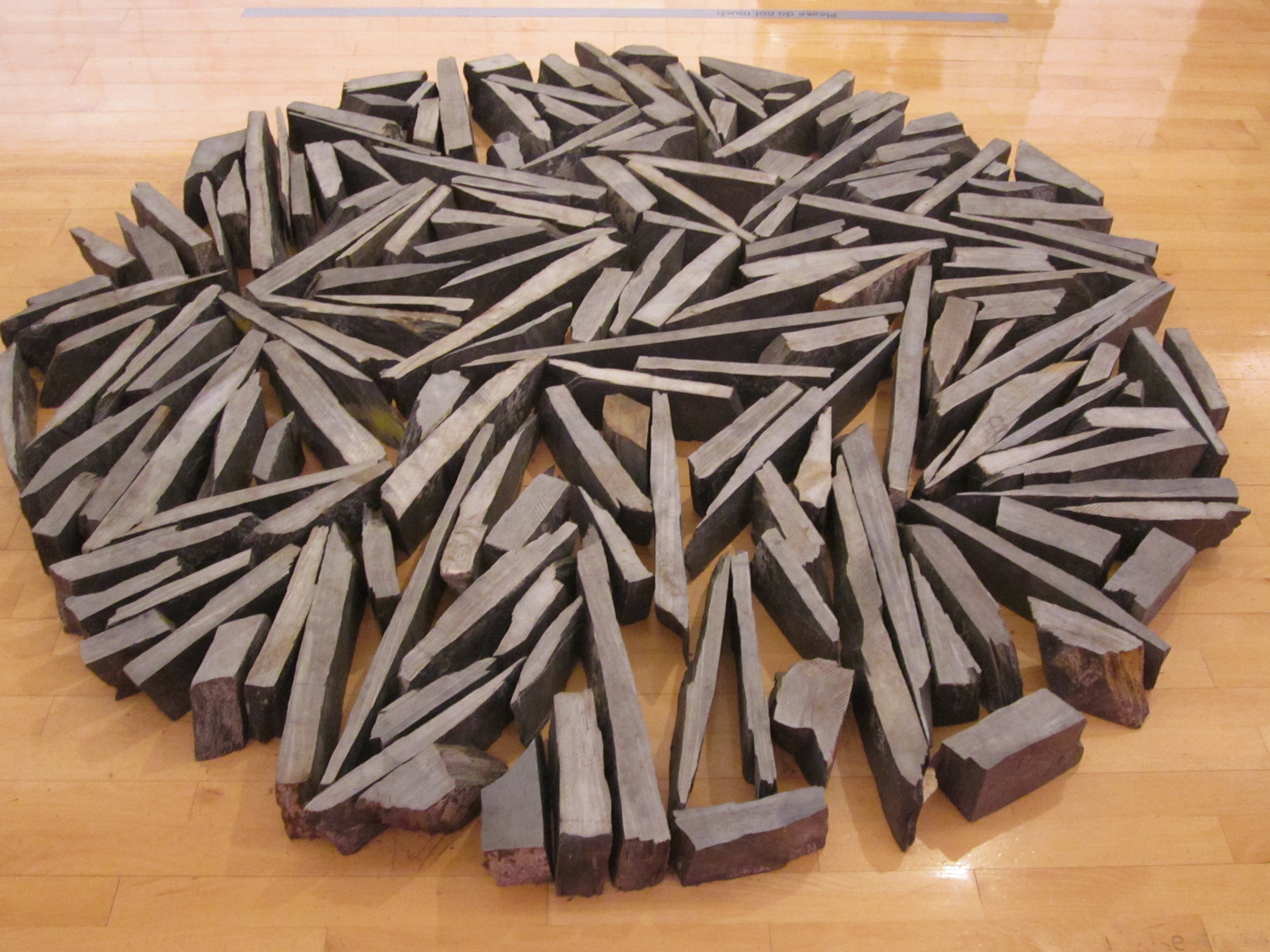
Richard Long, South Bank Circle, 1991 Tate Liverpool, England

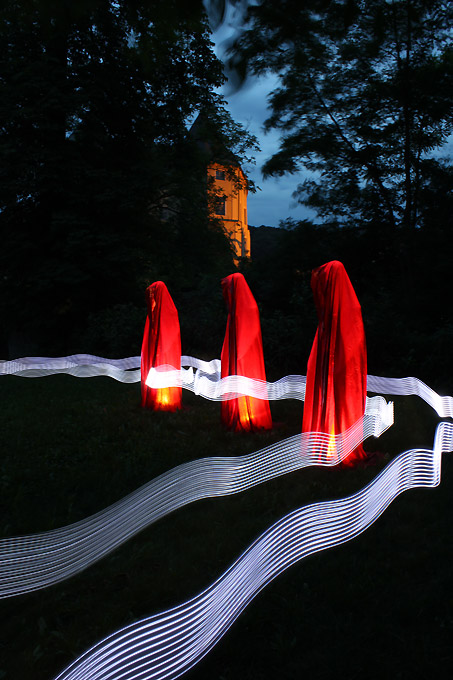
Time guards / Madonna, light sculpture by Manfred Kielnhofer at the Light Art Biennale Austria 2010

=== Minimalism ===
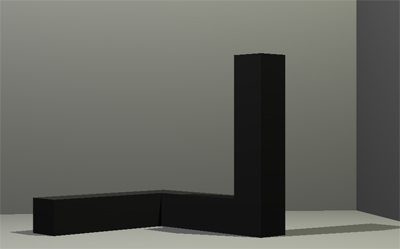
Tony Smith, Free Ride, 1962, Museum of Modern Art

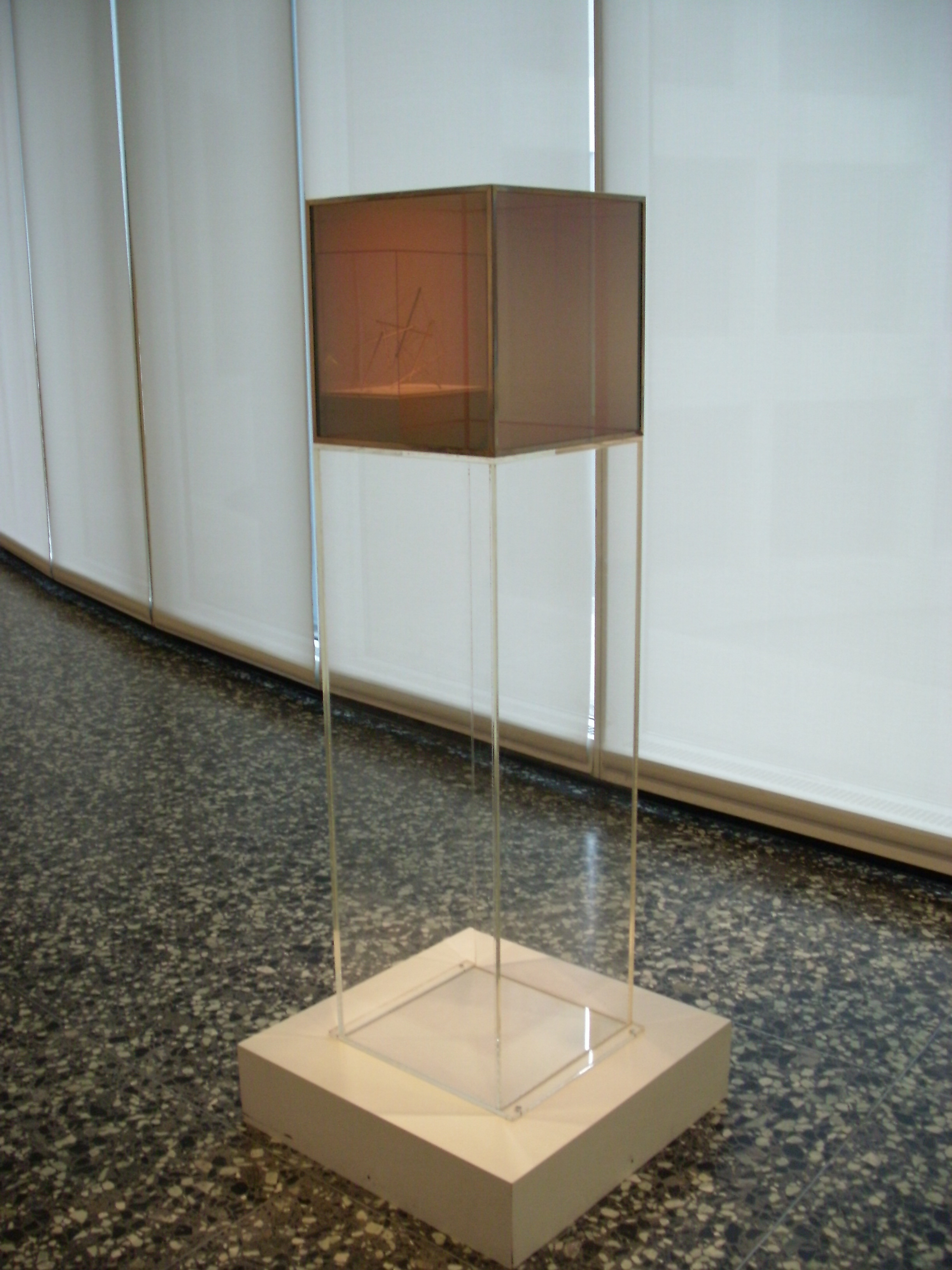
Larry Bell, Untitled 1964, bismuth, chromium, gold, and rhodium on gold-plated brass; Hirshhorn Museum and Sculpture Garden

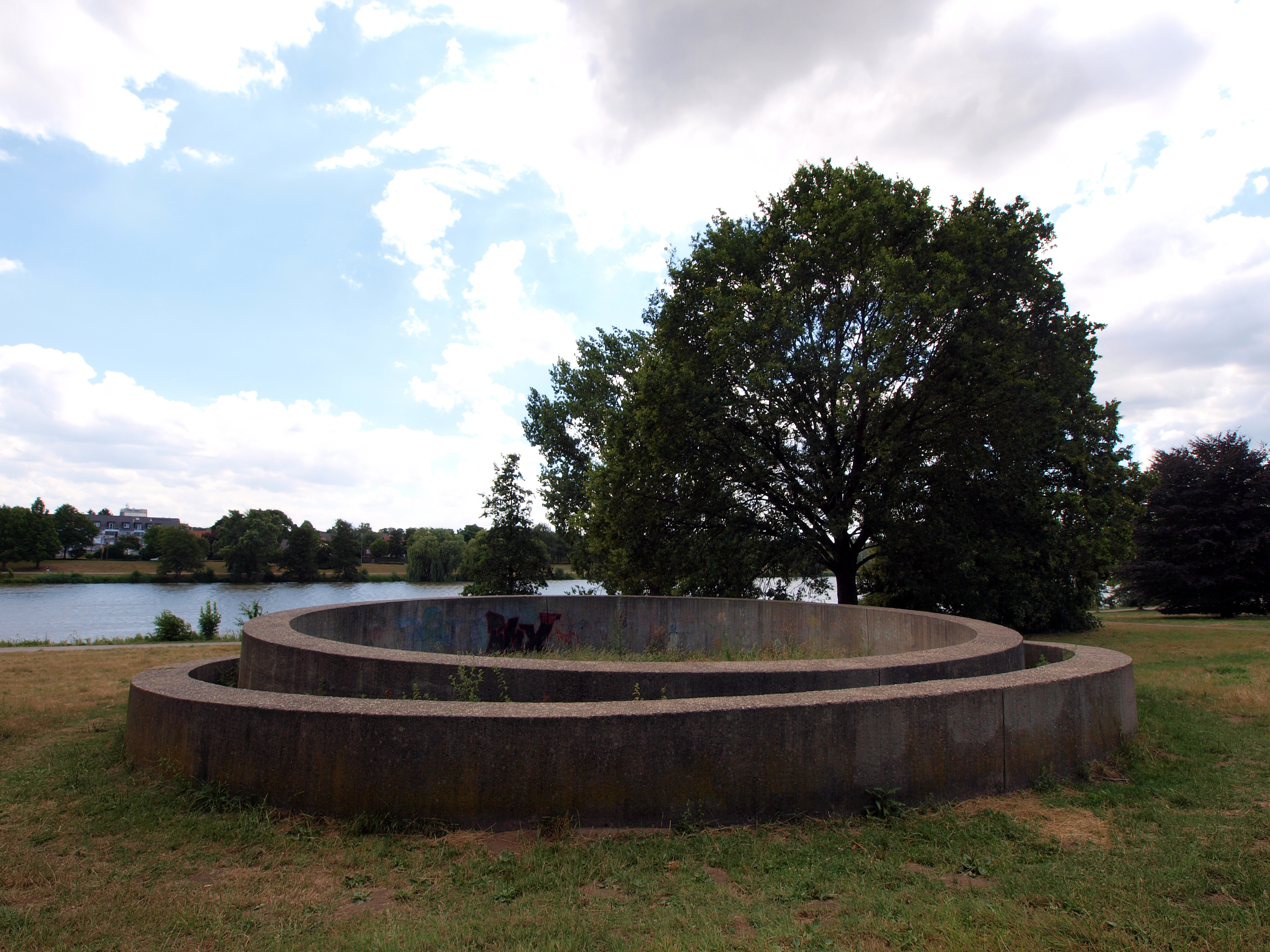
Donald Judd, Untitled 1977, Münster

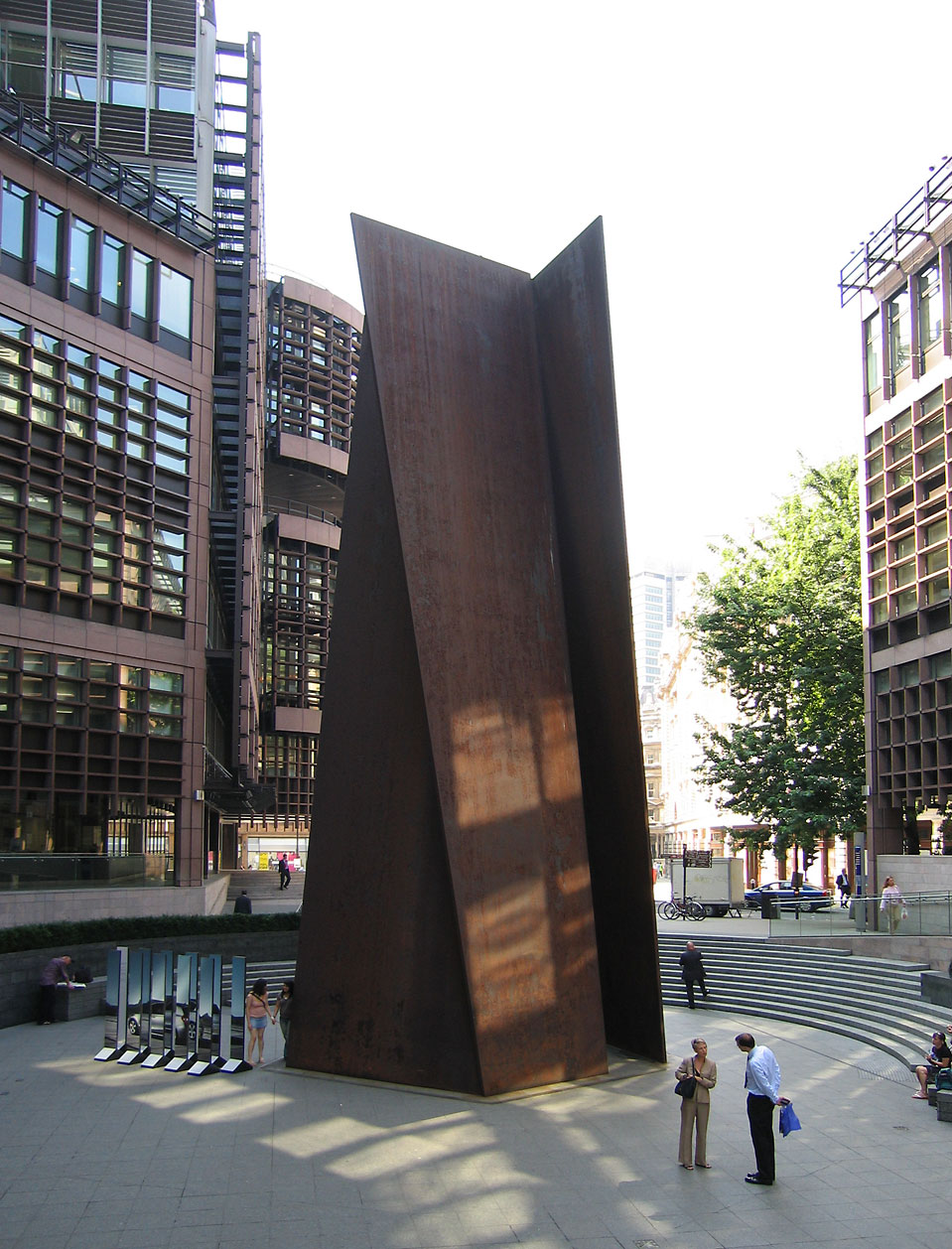
Richard Serra, Fulcrum 1987, 55-ft-high freestanding sculpture of Cor-ten steel near Liverpool Street station

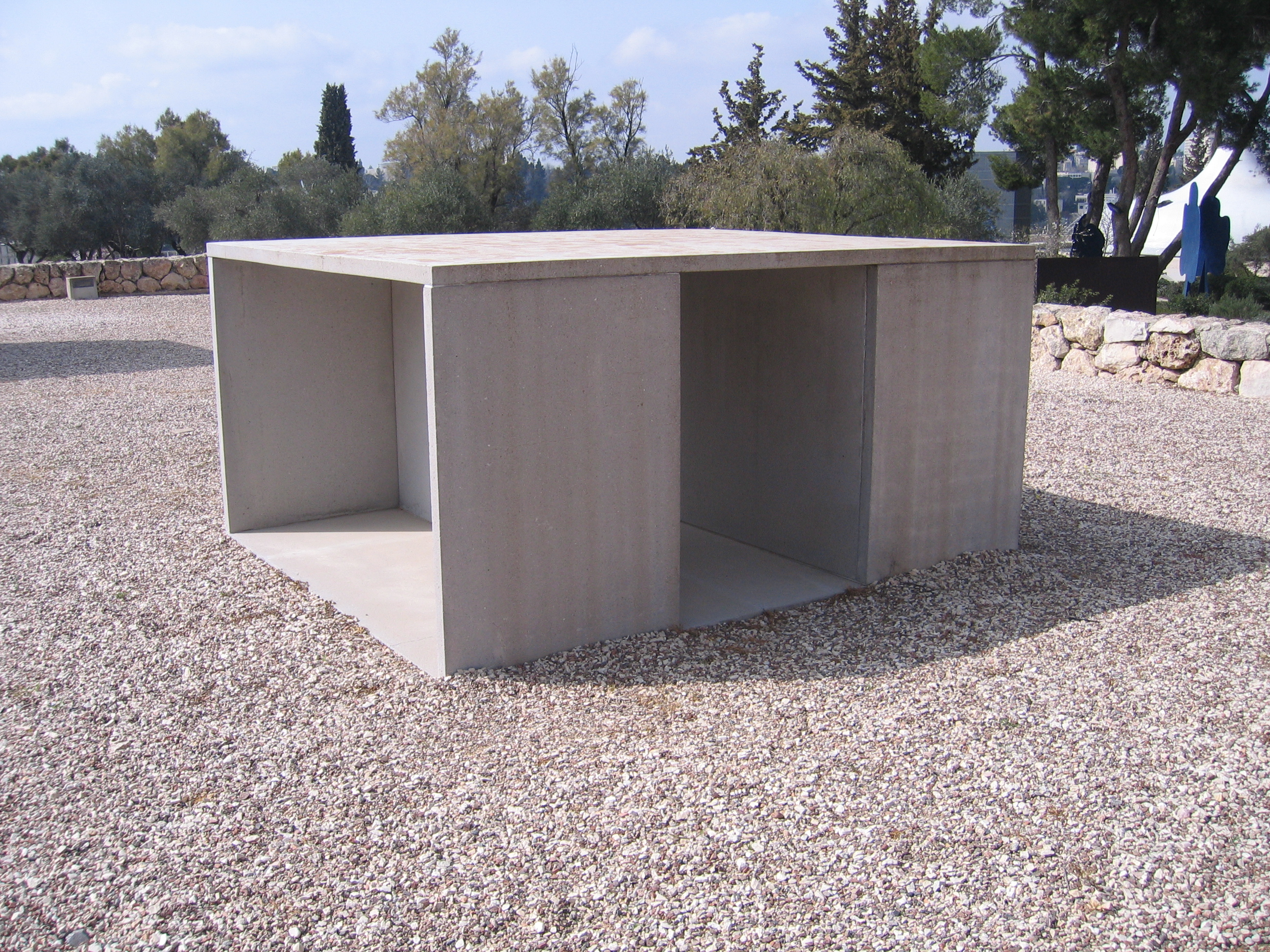
Donald Judd, Untitled, 1991, Israel Museum Art Garden

==== Postminimalism ====
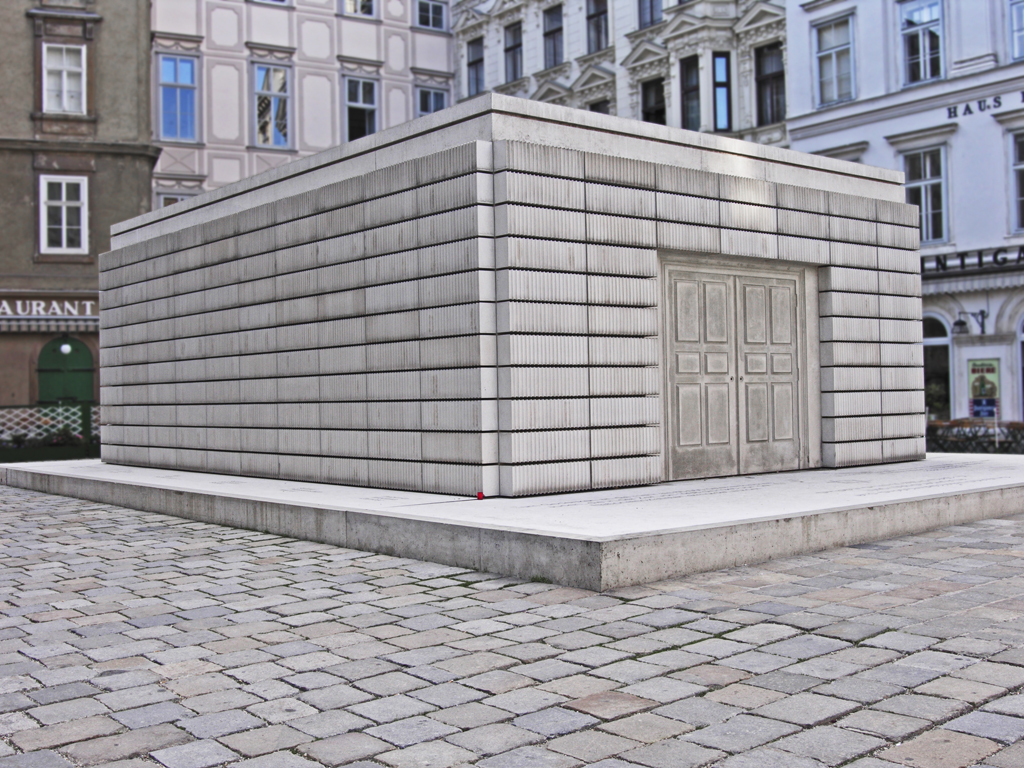
Rachel Whiteread, Holocaust Monument 2000 Judenplatz, Vienna

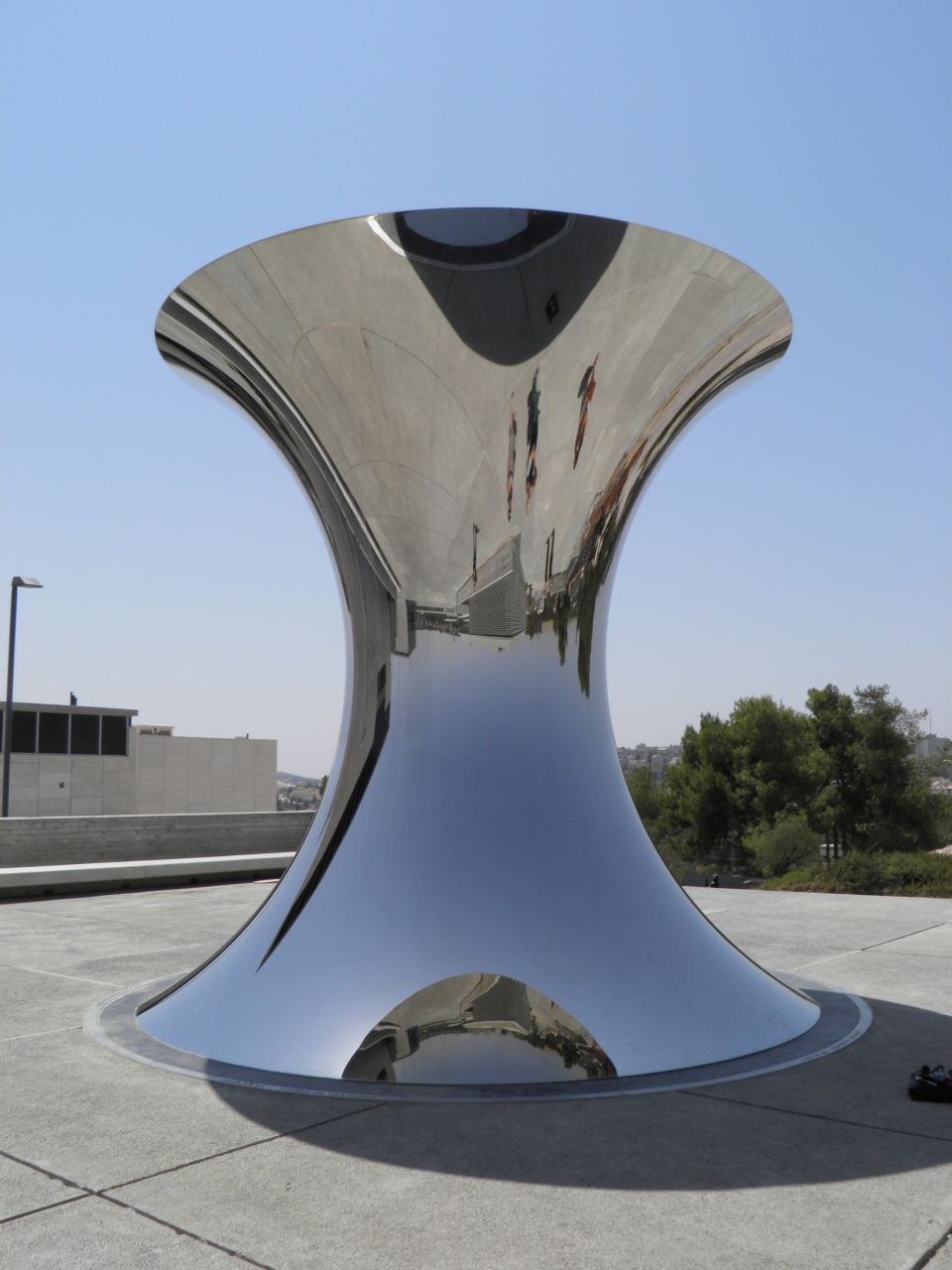
Anish Kapoor, Turning the World Upside Down, Israel Museum, 2010

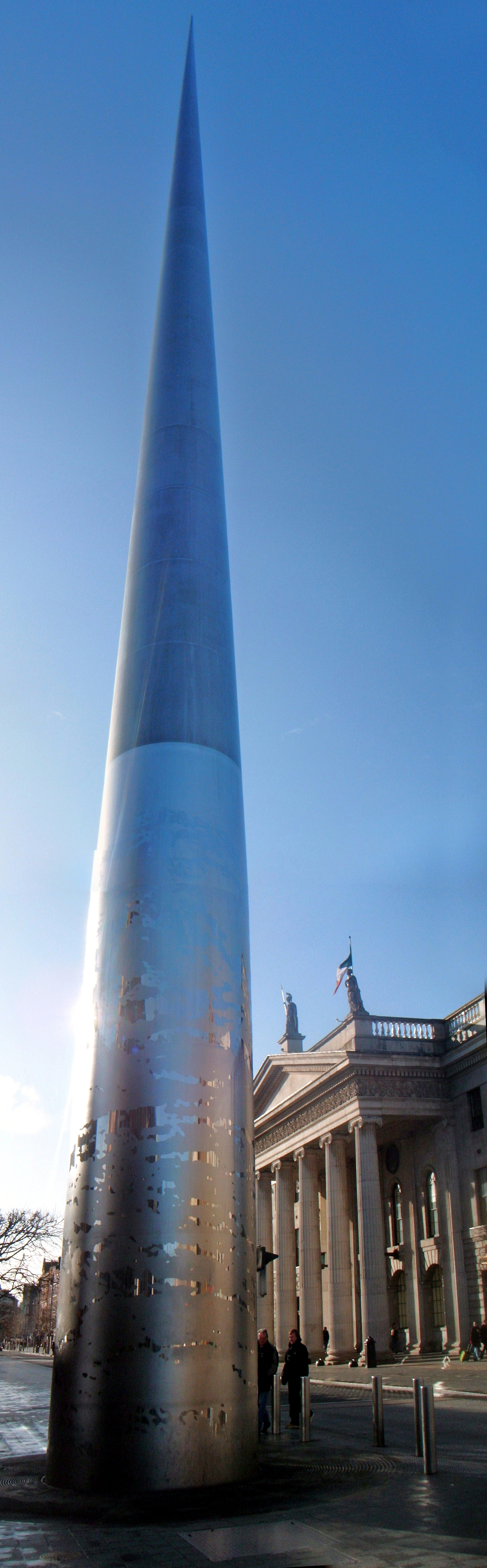
The Spire of Dublin officially titled the Monument of Light, stainless steel, 121.2 metres (398 ft), the world's tallest sculpture

==== Contemporary genres ====
Modern sculpture is often created outdoors, as in environmental art and environmental sculpture, often in full view of spectators. Light sculpture and site-specific art also often make use of the environment. Site-specific artwork is intentionally created for a specific place. The term was first used in the mid-1970s by sculptors Patricia Johanson, Dennis Oppenheim, Athena Tacha, and others. Site specific environmental art was described as a movement by architectural critic Catherine Howett and art critic Lucy Lippard. Land art, Earthworks, (Earth art) is an art movement that makes specific use of the real landscape to form works of sculpture that are located in and make use of nature generally in altered form. It is a form of sculpture created in nature, from nature, using materials found in nature like dirt, soil, rocks, logs, branches, leaves, and water, as well as man made materials like Chain-link fencing, barbed wire, rope, rubber, glass, concrete, metal, asphalt, and mineral pigments. Ice sculpture is a form of ephemeral sculpture that uses ice as the raw material. It is popular in China, Japan, Canada, Sweden, and Russia. Ice sculptures feature decoratively in some cuisines, especially in Asia. Kinetic sculptures are sculptures that are designed to move, which include mobiles. Snow sculptures are usually carved out of a single block of snow about 6 to 15 feet (4.6 m) on each side and weighing about 20–30 tons. The snow is densely packed into a form after having been produced by artificial means or collected from the ground after a snowfall.

Sound sculptures take the form of indoor sound installations, outdoor installations such as aeolian harps, automatons, or be more or less near conventional musical instruments. Sound sculpture is often site-specific. Art toys have become another format for contemporary artists since the late 1990s, such as those produced by Takashi Murakami and Kid Robot, designed by Michael Lau, or hand-made by Michael Leavitt.

== See also ==
- List of female sculptors
- List of sculptors
- Outline of sculpture
- List of most expensive sculptures
- National Gallery of Art Sculpture Garden
- Arborsculpture
- Assemblage
- Butter sculpture
- Bricolage
- California Clay Movement
- Collage
- Cubist sculpture
- Decollage
- Environmental art
- Earthworks (art)
- Electrotyping
- Floral design (Ikebana)
- Garden sculpture
- Gas sculpture
- Glassblowing
- Hologram
- Kinetic sculpture
- Land art (Earth art)
- Light sculpture
- Living sculpture
- Mask
- Mobiles
- Neon lighting and artists in light
- Origami
- Plaster cast
- Site-specific art
- Sustainable art
- Wax sculpture
- Welded sculpture
- Welding
