= Abernethy (surname) =

Abernethy is a surname whose origins link to a Scottish clan that descends from Orm de Abernethy, a grandson of Gille Míchéil, Earl of Fife that presumably settled at Abernethy, Perth and Kinross.

The name is of non-Gaelic Pictish origin, from a period when the Caledonian Welsh or Brytons controlled these lands. 'Aber' is modern Welsh for 'estuary' or 'confluence of rivers'.

Notable people who have this surname include:

- Alan Abernethy (born 1957), Irish bishop
- Alexander Abernethy, 6th Lord Saltoun (d. 1587), Scottish landowner and courtier
- Alexander de Abernethy (died ca. 1315), Scottish magnate
- Alister Abernethy (1920–2003), New Zealand politician
- Arthur Talmage Abernethy (1872–1956), journalist, theologian, poet; first North Carolina Poet Laureate
- Bob Abernethy (1927–2021), American television journalist
- Bob Abernethy (footballer) (1900–1969), Australian rules footballer
- Bruce Abernethy (born 1962), Australian rules football player
- Bruce Abernethy (cricketer) (born 1958), New Zealand former cricketer
- Charles Laban Abernethy (1872–1955), American politician
- Darrell Abernethy (1949–2017), American Associate Director for Drug Safety at the Food and Drug Administration
- George Abernethy (1807–1877), American politician
- Georgina Abernethy (1859–1906), New Zealand suffragist and leader of Wesleyan women
- Glen Abernethy (born 1971), American politician
- Hugh Abernethy (born 1967), Scottish former professional snooker player
- Haymitch Abernathy, fictional character in the Hunger Games series of books and novels
- James Abernethy (1814–1896), British civil engineer
- Jim Abernethy (1902–1974), Australian rules footballer
- John Abernethy (judge) (born 1947), former State Coroner of New South Wales
- John Abernethy (minister) (1680–1740), Irish Presbyterian minister and church leader
- John Abernethy (surgeon) FRS (1764–1831), English surgeon
- LeRoy Abernethy (1885–1959), American college football player
- Liam Abernethy (1929–1980), Irish hurler
- Lord Abernethy, hereditary title in the Peerage of Scotland
- John Cameron, Lord Abernethy (born 1938), a Senator of the College of Justice of Scotland
- Meg of Abernethy (1355–1405), Scottish musician
- Milton A. Abernethy (died 1991), American journalist, magazine editor, business owner, and stockbroker
- Moira Abernethy (born 1939), South African swimmer
- Ralph Abernathy (1926–1990), American civil rights activist and minister
- Robert Abernethy (born 1971), Australian swimmer
- Robert J. Abernethy (born 1940), American entrepreneur and philanthropist
- Rod Abernethy, American video game music composer
- Roy Abernethy (1906–1977), American businessman
- Ruth Abernethy (born 1960), Canadian sculptor
- Terence Abernethy (1930–1995), South African cricketer
- Thomas Abernethy (disambiguation), several people
- Tom Abernethy (born 1954), American basketball player
- Virginia Abernethy (born 1934), American professor of psychiatry and anthropology
- William de Abernethy, 2nd Baron of Saltoun (fl. 13th-14th century), Scottish nobleman.

Some notable people use Abernethy as their middle name:

- William Abernethy Drummond (1719–1809), bishop of Edinburgh
- Ralph Abernethy Gamble (1885–1959), American politician
- William Abernethy Ogilvie (1901–1989), Canadian painter and war artist

== See also ==
- Abernethy (disambiguation)
- Abernathy (disambiguation)
