= Abernathy (surname) =

Abernathy, a chiefly North American variation of the surname Abernethy, may refer to:

- Anne Abernathy (born 1953), American luger
- Ben Abernathy, American editor
- Bob Abernathy (1928–2021), American journalist
- Brent Abernathy (born 1977), American baseball player
- Charles F. Abernathy (born 1946), American law professor
- Constance Abernathy (1931–1994), American architect and jeweller
- Donzaleigh Abernathy (born 1967), American actress
- Frankie Abernathy (1981–2007), American castmate on MTV's The Real World: San Diego
- Irvin Abernathy (1852–1925), American politician from Mississippi
- Jack Abernathy (1876–1941), United States Marshall
- Juanita Abernathy (1931–2019), American civil rights activist
- Kathleen Q. Abernathy (born 1956), American commissioner
- Louis and Temple Abernathy, children of Jack Abernathy
- Micah Abernathy (born 1997), American football player
- Ralph Abernathy (1926–1990), American civil rights leader
- Ralph David Abernathy III (1959–2016), American politician
- Robert Abernathy (1917–1997), American baseball player
- Robert Abernathy (1924–1990), American science fiction writer
- Ted Abernathy (1933–2004), American baseball player
- William J. Abernathy (1933–1983), American business professor
- Woody Abernathy (1908–1961), American baseball player
- Woody Abernathy (1915–1994), American baseball player

== See also ==
- Abernethy (surname)
- Abernathyite
