= Robert Abernethy =

Robert or Bob Abernethy may refer to:

- Bob Abernethy (footballer) (1900–1969), Australian VFL player
- Bob Abernethy (1927–2021), American television news personality
- Robert J. Abernethy (born 1940), American businessman and philanthropist
- Robert Abernethy (swimmer) (born 1971), Australian swimmer

== See also ==
- Robert Abernathy (baseball) (1917–1997), American outfielder in Negro leagues, a/k/a James Abernathy
- Robert Abernathy (1924–1990), American science fiction author
