= Abernathy =

Abernathy may refer to:

== Places in the United States ==
- Abernathy, Alabama, an unincorporated community
- Abernathy, Texas, a city

== Other uses ==
- Abernathy (surname)
- Abernathy High School, Abernathy, Texas
- Abernathy Municipal Airport, Hale County, Texas
- Abernathy Field Station, Pennsylvania, an outdoor classroom for Washington & Jefferson College

== See also ==
- Abernethy (disambiguation)
