= John Abernethy =

John Abernethy may refer to:

- John Abernethy (bishop) (c. 1570–1639), Scottish bishop
- John Abernethy (judge) (born 1947), Australian judge
- John Abernethy (minister) (1680–1740), Presbyterian minister in Ireland
- John Abernethy (surgeon) (1764–1831), English surgeon and grandson of the above, and originator of the Abernethy biscuit
- Jack Abernathy (1876–1941), United States marshal

== See also ==
- Abernethy (surname)
