= Frederick, Oklahoma =

- City
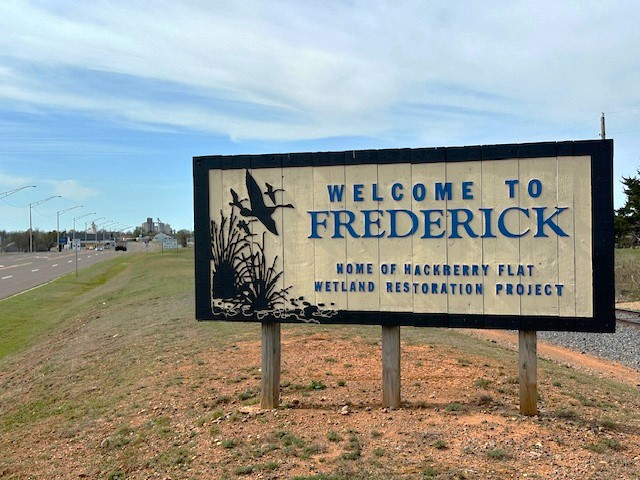
- Welcome sign at Frederick, 3-2025

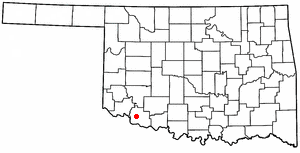
- Location of Frederick within Oklahoma
- Coordinates: 34°23′33″N 99°00′52″W
- Country: United States
- State: Oklahoma
- County: Tillman

Government
  - Type: Council-Manager

Area
  - Total: 4.96 sq mi (12.84 km^{2})
  - Land: 4.95 sq mi (12.81 km^{2})
  - Water: 0.012 sq mi (0.03 km^{2})
- Elevation: 1,237 ft (377 m)

Population (2020)
  - Total: 3,468
  - Density: 701.1/sq mi (270.68/km^{2})
- Time zone: UTC-6 (CST)
  - Summer (DST): UTC-5 (CDT)
- ZIP code: 73542
- Area code: 580
- FIPS code: 40-27800
- GNIS feature ID: 2410541
- Website: City website

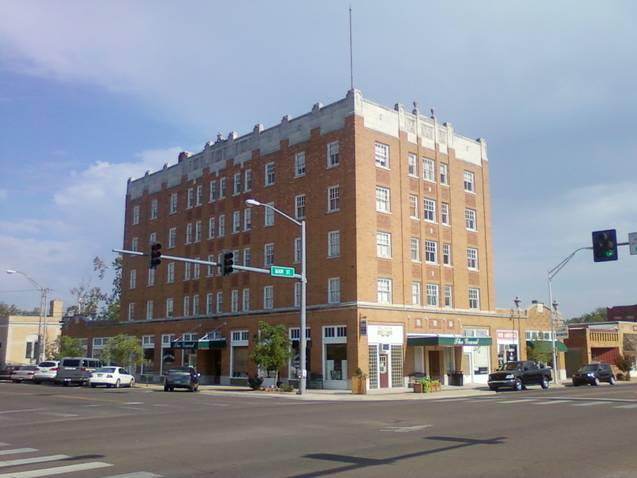
Grand Hotel in 2012

Frederick is a city in and the county seat of Tillman County, Oklahoma, United States. The population was 3,468 at the time of the 2020 Census. It is an agriculture-based community that primarily produces wheat, cotton, and cattle. Frederick is home to three dairies, a 1400-acre industrial park, and Frederick Regional Airport, which includes restored World War II hangars which house the World War II Airborne Demonstration Team.

Frederick was visited in April 1905 by then U.S. President Theodore Roosevelt while he was on a wolf hunt.

== History ==
Originally established in 1901, the Frederick area was among the last of the Oklahoma Territory land to be opened to settlement. What is now Frederick used to be two towns: Gosnell and Hazel. Both towns were established in 1901, when the Kiowa-Comanche-Apache reservation was opened to settlement. (Note: Gosnell was named for Rev. Sanford N. Gosnell, who was a lottery winner that established the town named for himself. Hazel was named for Hazel Stout, the daughter of another lottery winner.) In 1902 the towns combined in order to take advantage of the Blackwell, Enid and Southwestern Railway. The new town was named Frederick, after the son of a railroad executive. Gosnell received the depot, and the residents of Hazel moved north to the new town of Frederick. The post office moved from Gosnell to Frederick, for which it was renamed in 1902.

Most of the business district was destroyed by fires in 1904 and 1905. The buildings had been made of wood and were quickly replaced with brick.

In the spring of 1905, President Teddy Roosevelt visited Frederick to meet with Jack "Catch-'em-alive" Abernathy, the famed barehanded wolf hunter, and introduced the area to tourism and its recreational value. In 1907 the City of Frederick was incorporated, Oklahoma became a state, Frederick was named the seat of Tillman County, and the Missouri–Kansas–Texas Railroad ("Katy") came to Frederick. By 1915, Frederick had 15 miles of sidewalks and crossings, and 75 miles of wide, graded, rolled streets. The first paved streets were laid in 1918.

The Frederick Army Air Field opened in 1941, training pilots to fly UC-78 light transport aircraft and B-25 medium bombers. In 1953, the base was turned over to the City of Frederick, and is now the Frederick Regional Airport.

In 1962 a flagpole was erected in Pioneer Park, fulfilling the agreement between Gosnell, Hazel and the railroad.

== Geography ==
Frederick is located at the junction of U.S. Route 183 and Oklahoma State Highway 5. According to the United States Census Bureau, the city has a total area of 5.0 square miles (13 km^{2}), of which 5.0 square miles (13 km^{2}) is land and 0.20% is water.

Lake Frederick, owned by the town, is about 15 miles northeast.

Hackberry Flat Wildlife Management Area, roughly 13 miles south-southeast of Frederick, is a restored wetlands habitat which forms a managed location for both wildlife and recreation. It encompasses 7,120 acres including 3,500 acres for flooding, 100 water control structures, and a 17-mile pipeline to bring water from Tom Steed Reservoir as needed.

=== Climate ===
Climate data for Frederick, Oklahoma
Month	Jan	Feb	Mar	Apr	May	Jun	Jul	Aug	Sep	Oct	Nov	Dec	Year
Record high °F (°C)	90 (32)	93 (34)	98 (37)	101 (38)	107 (42)	114 (46)	114 (46)	117 (47)	111 (44)	103 (39)	93 (34)	86 (30)	117 (47)
Mean daily maximum °F (°C)	53 (12)	60 (16)	68 (20)	81 (27)	84 (29)	93 (34)	97 (36)	98 (37)	90 (32)	79 (26)	65 (18)	55 (13)	77 (25)
Mean daily minimum °F (°C)	29 (−2)	33 (1)	39 (4)	49 (9)	58 (14)	67 (19)	71 (22)	70 (21)	63 (17)	52 (11)	40 (4)	31 (−1)	50 (10)
Record low °F (°C)	−8 (−22)	−5 (−21)	3 (−16)	23 (−5)	35 (2)	43 (6)	52 (11)	48 (9)	34 (1)	17 (−8)	9 (−13)	—	−8 (−22)
Average precipitation inches (mm)	1.1 (28)	1.2 (30)	1.7 (43)	2.6 (66)	4.5 (110)	2.9 (74)	2.2 (56)	2.1 (53)	2.6 (66)	3 (76)	1.5 (38)	1.4 (36)	26.8 (680)
Average snowfall inches (cm)	2.2 (5.6)	1.4 (3.6)	1.2 (3.0)	0.2 (0.51)	0.2 (0.51)	1.5 (3.8)	—	—	—	—	—	—	6.7 (17)
Average rainy days	3	3.2	4.4	5.7	7	5.4	4.5	4.3	4.5	5	2.9	3.5	53.4
Average relative humidity (%)	74	74	68	63	65	62	57	50	55	62	60	72	64
Source 1: weather.com
Source 2: Weatherbase.com

== Demographics ==
Historical population
Census	Pop.	Note	%±
1910	3,027		—
1920	3,822		26.3%
1930	4,568		19.5%
1940	5,109		11.8%
1950	5,467		7.0%
1960	5,879		7.5%
1970	6,132		4.3%
1980	6,153		0.3%
1990	5,221		−15.1%
2000	4,637		−11.2%
2010	3,940		−15.0%
2020	3,468		−12.0%
U.S. Decennial Census

=== 2020 census ===
As of the 2020 census, Frederick had a population of 3,468. The median age was 40.3 years, 26.2% of residents were under the age of 18, and 19.1% were 65 years of age or older. For every 100 females there were 98.2 males, and for every 100 females age 18 and over there were 94.9 males age 18 and over.

0% of residents lived in urban areas, while 100.0% lived in rural areas.

There were 1,352 households in Frederick, of which 32.2% had children under the age of 18 living in them. Of all households, 43.9% were married-couple households, 21.7% were households with a male householder and no spouse or partner present, and 28.4% were households with a female householder and no spouse or partner present. About 30.2% of all households were made up of individuals and 15.7% had someone living alone who was 65 years of age or older.

There were 1,907 housing units, of which 29.1% were vacant. Among occupied housing units, 75.1% were owner-occupied and 24.9% were renter-occupied. The homeowner vacancy rate was 4.4% and the rental vacancy rate was 20.3%.

Racial composition as of the 2020 census
Race	Percent
White	60.2%
Black or African American	8.5%
American Indian and Alaska Native	4.3%
Asian	0.6%
Native Hawaiian and Other Pacific Islander	0%
Some other race	14.4%
Two or more races	12.0%
Hispanic or Latino (of any race)	34.2%

=== 2000 census ===
As of the 2000 census, there were 4,637 people, 1,797 households, and 1,211 families residing in the city. The population density was 935.3 inhabitants per square mile (361.1/km^{2}). There were 2,145 housing units at an average density of 432.7 per square mile (167.1/km^{2}). The racial makeup of the city was 68.04% White, 11.32% African American, 2.80% Native American, 0.43% Asian, 0.04% Pacific Islander, 13.85% from other races, and 3.52% from two or more races. Hispanic or Latino of any race were 22.02% of the population.

There were 1,797 households, out of which 30.5% had children under the age of 18 living with them, 51.9% were married couples living together, 12.4% had a female householder with no husband present, and 32.6% were non-families. 29.9% of all households were made up of individuals, and 18.7% had someone living alone who was 65 years of age or older. The average household size was 2.51 and the average family size was 3.12.

In the city, the population was spread out, with 27.1% under the age of 18, 7.5% from 18 to 24, 23.3% from 25 to 44, 21.3% from 45 to 64, and 20.8% who were 65 years of age or older. The median age was 38 years. For every 100 females, there were 87.9 males. For every 100 females age 18 and over, there were 80.7 males.

The median income for a household in the city was $22,190, and the median income for a family was $28,724. Males had a median income of $22,324 versus $18,033 for females. The per capita income for the city was $13,575. About 19.0% of families and 23.3% of the population were below the poverty line, including 33.9% of those under age 18 and 15.8% of those age 65 or over.

== Government ==
Frederick has a City Manager/Council type of government. There are five councilpersons, one from each of the wards and one at large position. The current City Manager is Kyle Davis and the Mayor is Kevin Ouellette Sr.

== Education ==
Great Plains Technology Center is located in Frederick.

Frederick is served by Frederick Public Schools, which include a high school, middle school, and elementary school. The public school team name is the Bombers. The Frederick High School 1956 football team won the first state championship with an inter-racial team, and in 2007 were inducted into the Oklahoma Sports Hall of Fame. The teams were combined of the two high schools in Frederick, Frederick High School and Boyd High School. The Frederick Bombers returned to the state championship almost 40 years later and won the state championships in 1993, 1994. 1995 and 1996.

School colors: In the 1950s the school colors were maroon and gray. This was changed in the late 1960s to red and white. In the late 1980s, the color black was added to the red and white.

== Historical sites ==
The following are NRHP-listed sites in Frederick:

The Ramona Theatre, built in 1929, is an excellent example of Spanish Colonial style. An atmospheric-type theater, its interior details include electric twinkling stars and brenograph rolling clouds traveling across a midnight blue plaster sky.

Tillman County Courthouse, built in 1921, is a three-story structure built of concrete slabs laid to resemble dressed stone. The north side has an unusual curved wall, and is an outstanding example of the architects’ blending of classical styles.

J.D. Laney House is a one-story Craftsman-style bungalow built in 1928–1929 by John David Laney as the main house on his farm. The house was built of various types of native stone including rough granite, polished granite, sandstone, and limestone.

== Culture ==
Frederick hosts the annual Oklahoma Cotton Festival in September. The Frederick Public Library, originally funded in 1915 by the Carnegie Foundation, is still in service. The Tillman County Historical Society in the Pioneer Heritage Townsite Center features the old railroad depot and other historic buildings. A life-size statue of Louis and Temple Abernathy on the Tillman County Courthouse Square honors two Frederick boys who, in 1910, became national celebrities at age 6 and 10 when they rode alone by horseback from Frederick to Washington, DC to visit President Taft, and on to New York City where they greeted former President Theodore Roosevelt on his return from an African safari.

== Notable people ==
- Newby O. Brantly (1905–1993) — inventor and entrepreneur, lived and died in Frederick
- Bob Bryant (1918–2000) — born in Frederick, football player for the NFL and CFL
- Alyce Faye Eichelberger Cleese (née McBride; born 1944 in Frederick) —American psychotherapist, author, and talk radio host
- Charles Collins (1904–1999) — actor in films and on Broadway, born in Frederick
- Glenn Dobbs (1920–2002) — pro football player in AAFC and Canadian leagues, 1980 College Football Hall of Fame-inductee, head coach at Tulsa
- Anthony M. Massad (1920–2017) — Oklahoma state senator and lawyer, practiced law in Frederick
- Buddy Ryan (1931–2016) — born in Frederick, football player, AFL and NFL coach, created and popularized 46 defense

== Gallery ==
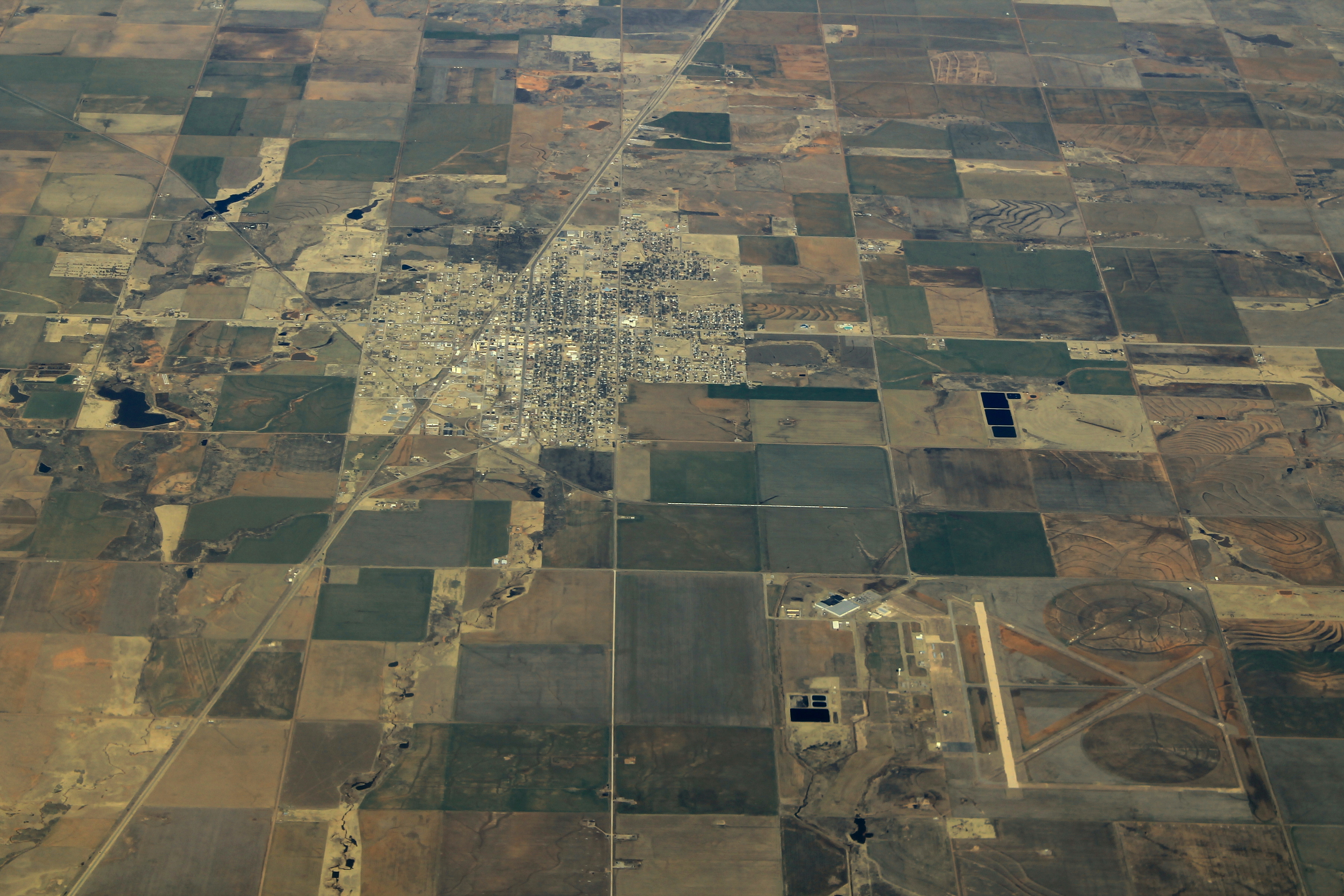
Aerial view of Frederick

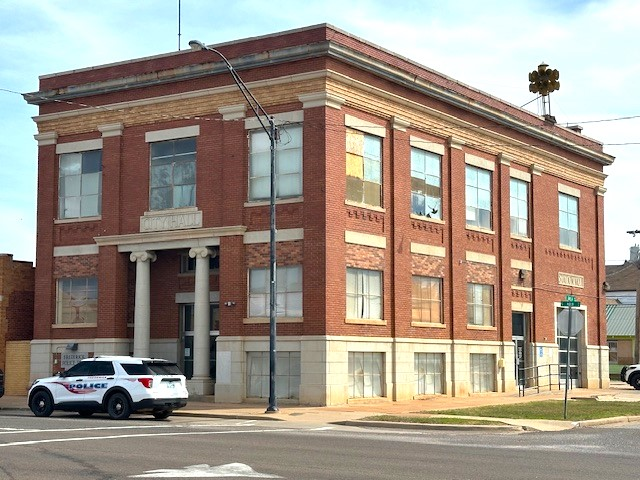
City Hall at Frederick in 3-2025

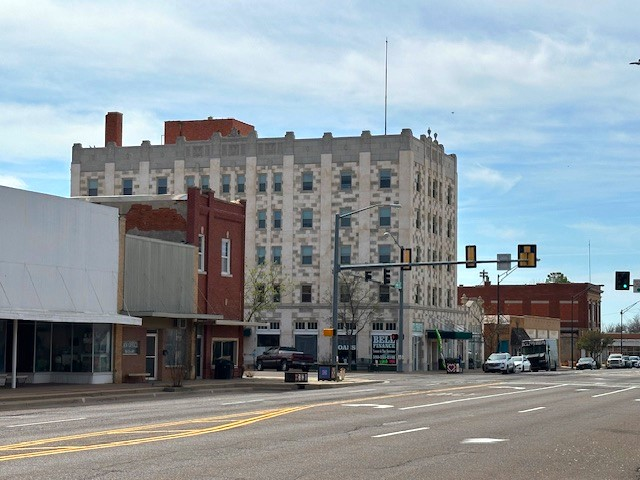
Downtown 3-2025 with the 1929 Frederick Hotel, now mostly retirement apartments

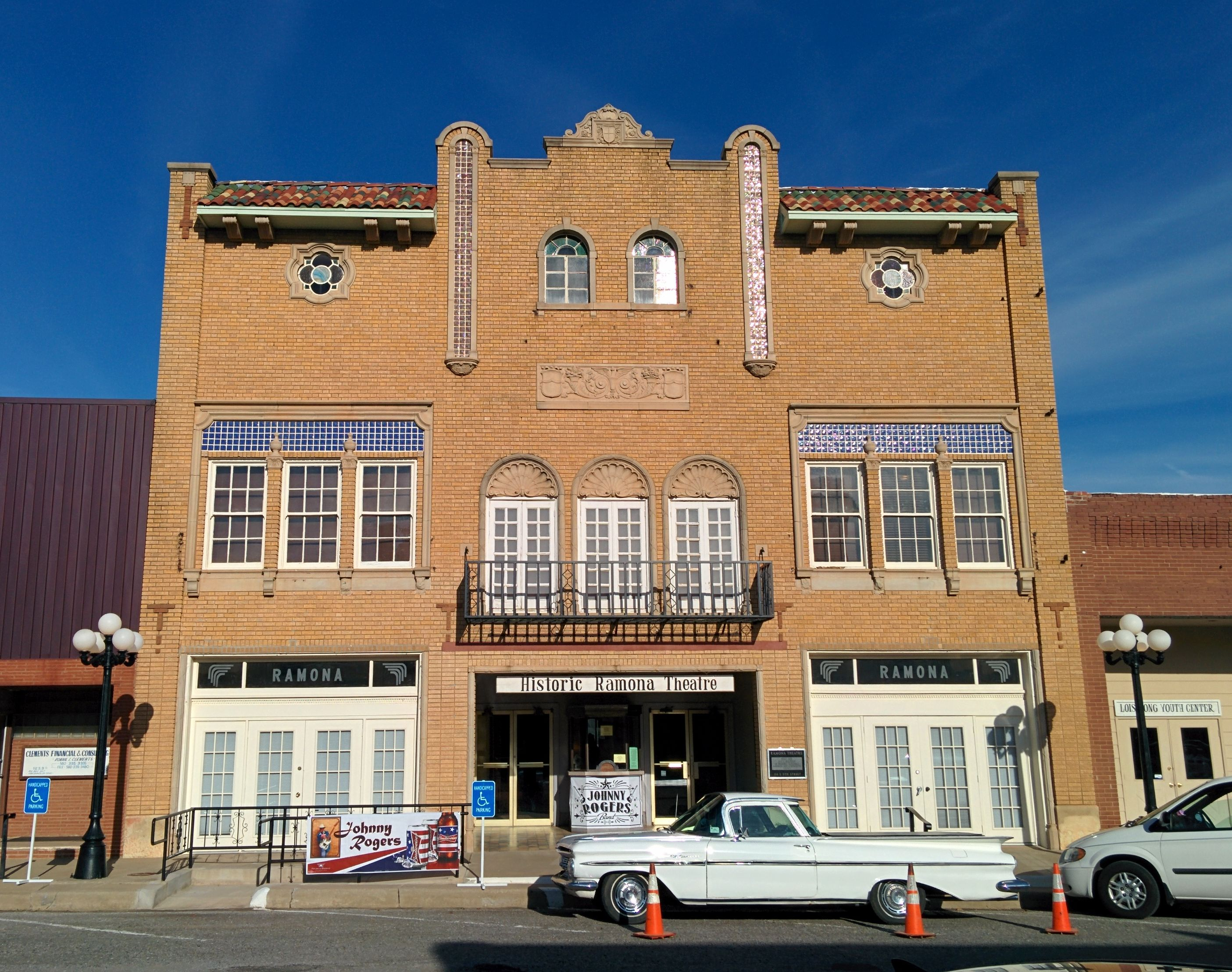
The 1929 Spanish-colonial-style Ramona Theater, on the National Register of Historic Places listings in Tillman County, Oklahoma

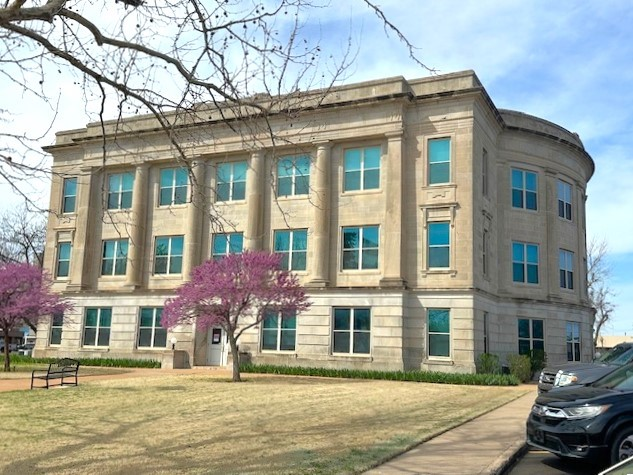
Tillman County Courthouse in Frederick, 3-2025
