= Los Angeles Music Center =

Performing arts center in Los Angeles, California

Coordinates: 34.058°N 118.247°W

Music Center
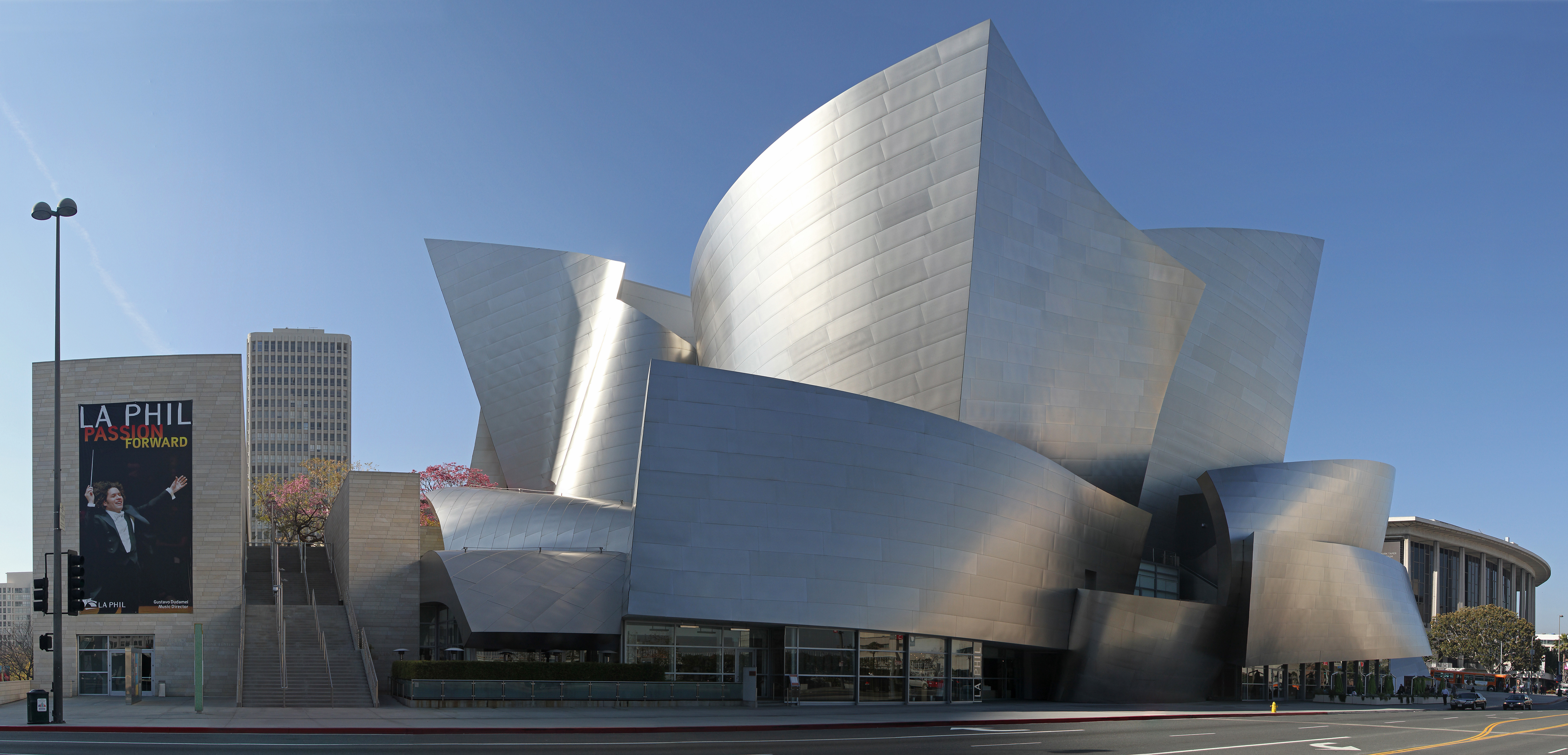
- The Walt Disney Concert Hall, with the Dorothy Chandler Pavilion to the right

Background
- Location: 135 North Grand Avenue; Los Angeles, California, U.S.
- Visitors: 1.3 million per year
- Established: 1964; 62 years ago
- Resident Companies: Los Angeles Philharmonic; Los Angeles Opera; Los Angeles Master Chorale; Center Theatre Group
- Venues: Ahmanson Theatre; Dorothy Chandler Pavilion; Mark Taper Forum; Walt Disney Concert Hall; REDCAT (Roy and Edna Disney/Calarts Theater)
- Performances: Orchestra; opera; drama; musical; chorale; lecture; dance; family; participatory
- Also Called: The Performing Arts Center of Los Angeles County

Information
- Website: Official website
- Public transit: Civic Ctr; Grand Av

The Los Angeles Music Center (officially the Performing Arts Center of Los Angeles County) is one of the largest performing arts centers in the United States. Located in downtown Los Angeles, The Music Center is composed of the Dorothy Chandler Pavilion, Ahmanson Theatre, Mark Taper Forum, Roy & Edna Disney CalArts Theatre (REDCAT), and Walt Disney Concert Hall.

Annually, 1.3 million people attend performances at the center for its four internationally renowned resident companies: Los Angeles Philharmonic, Los Angeles Opera, Los Angeles Master Chorale, and Center Theatre Group (CTG) as well as performances by the dance series Glorya Kaufman Presents Dance at The Music Center. The center is home to on-going community events, arts festivals, outdoor concerts, participatory arts activities and workshops, and educational programs.

== History ==
In April 1955, Dorothy Chandler, wife of Los Angeles Times publisher Norman Chandler, began fundraising toward a permanent home for the philharmonic. Ultimately Mrs. Chandler raised almost $20 million in private donations; the County provided the site and raised the remaining $14 million using mortgage revenue bonds.

The rest of the complex was completed in April 1967. The additional venues, the Mark Taper Forum and Ahmanson Theatre, were dedicated on April 9 and 12, 1967, respectively.

When the Dorothy Chandler Pavilion opened its doors on December 6, 1964, the twenty-eight-year-old Zubin Mehta led the Los Angeles Philharmonic in a program that included violinist Jascha Heifetz and performances of Strauss' Wiener Philharmoniker Fanfare and Beethoven's Violin Concerto in D Major. The Mark Taper Forum, "scandalizing the power structure of Los Angeles," according to its artistic director Gordon Davidson, with its provocative opening production of John Whiting's The Devils. The Ahmanson Theatre opened with a performance of the Man of La Mancha by the Civic Light Opera. The first dramatic season at the Ahmanson featured Ingrid Bergman in O'Neill's More Stately Mansions, signaling its intent to marry big-name playwrights with big-name stars.

Since its opening in 1964, The Music Center has seen the American debuts of Simon Rattle and Esa-Pekka Salonen, the world premieres of The Shadow Box, Zoot Suit, Children of a Lesser God, and Angels in America at the Taper, and performances by Jessica Tandy, Hume Cronyn, Katharine Hepburn, and Maggie Smith at the Ahmanson. The philharmonic and L.A. Master Chorale joined forces to provide the accompaniment to Eisenstein's restored silent film classic Alexander Nevsky. While the Civic Light Opera's last season at The Music Center was in 1987, the Los Angeles Music Center Opera was formed in 1986. Its productions have included Wagner's Tristan and Isolde directed by Jonathan Miller and designed by David Hockney.

The Music Center hosts the annual Los Angeles County Holiday Celebration on Christmas Eve since 1960 with performances from singers, dance groups and musicians. The event is free to everyone and it is televised on PBS SoCal.

=== Construction of Walt Disney Concert Hall and Roy and Edna Disney/CalArts Theater ===
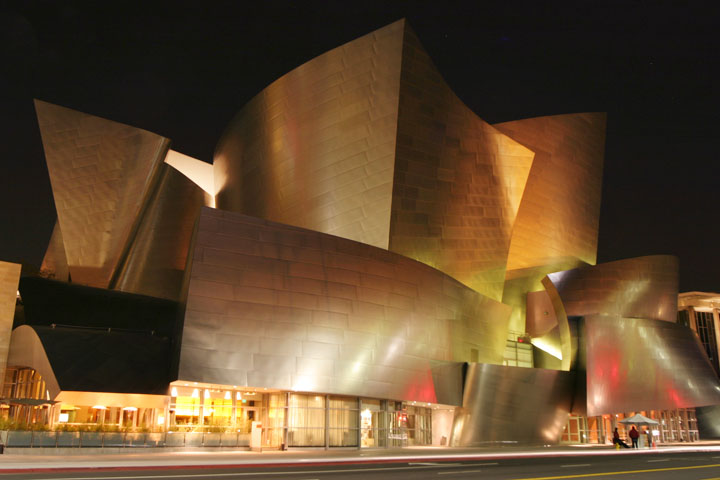
Walt Disney Concert Hall, designed by Frank Gehry

On October 23, 2003, The Music Center opened the Frank-Gehry-designed Walt Disney Concert Hall, expanding the campus to 11 acres (45,000 m^{2}). The 2,265-seat Concert Hall is home to the Los Angeles Philharmonic and the Los Angeles Master Chorale. Walt Disney Concert Hall includes the 266-seat Roy and Edna Disney/CalArts Theater (REDCAT) and outdoor program areas including the W. M. Keck Foundation Children's Amphitheatre, seating 250-300 and the Nadine and Ed Carson amphitheatre seating 120.

=== Music Center Plaza renovation ===
The main plaza underwent a $40 million renovation in July 2018, which doubled the plaza's capacity from 2,500 to 5,000 people.

== Venues ==
The main venues of the complex (which also includes some outdoor amphitheaters) are:

- Dorothy Chandler Pavilion: 3,197 seats
- Mark Taper Forum: 739 seats
- Ahmanson Theatre: 1,600 to 2,007 seats, depending on configuration
- Walt Disney Concert Hall: 2,265 seats
- Roy & Edna Disney CalArts Theatre (REDCAT): 266 seats

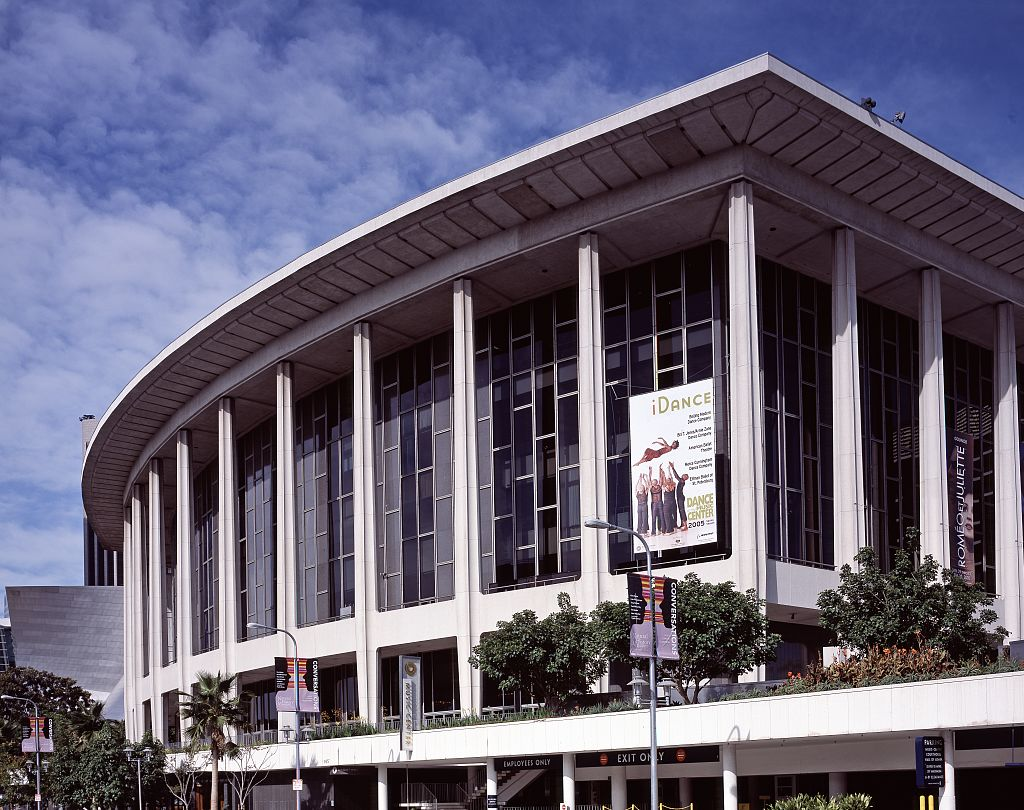
Dorothy Chandler Pavilion

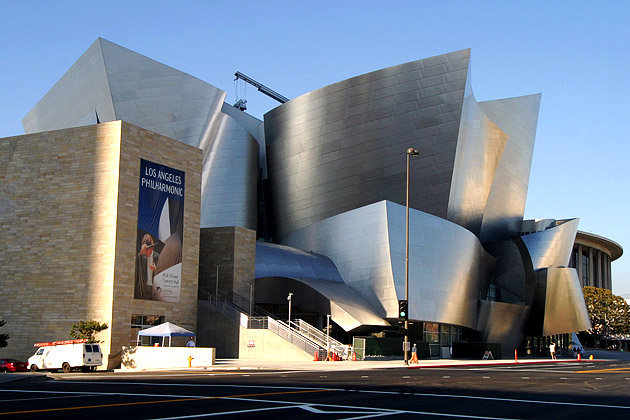
Walt Disney Concert Hall

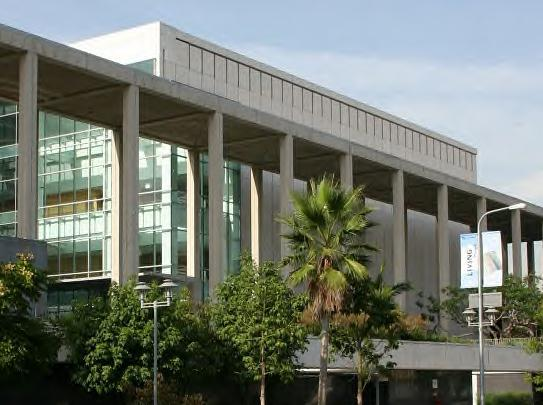
Ahmanson Theatre

== Photos from the Historic American Buildings Survey ==
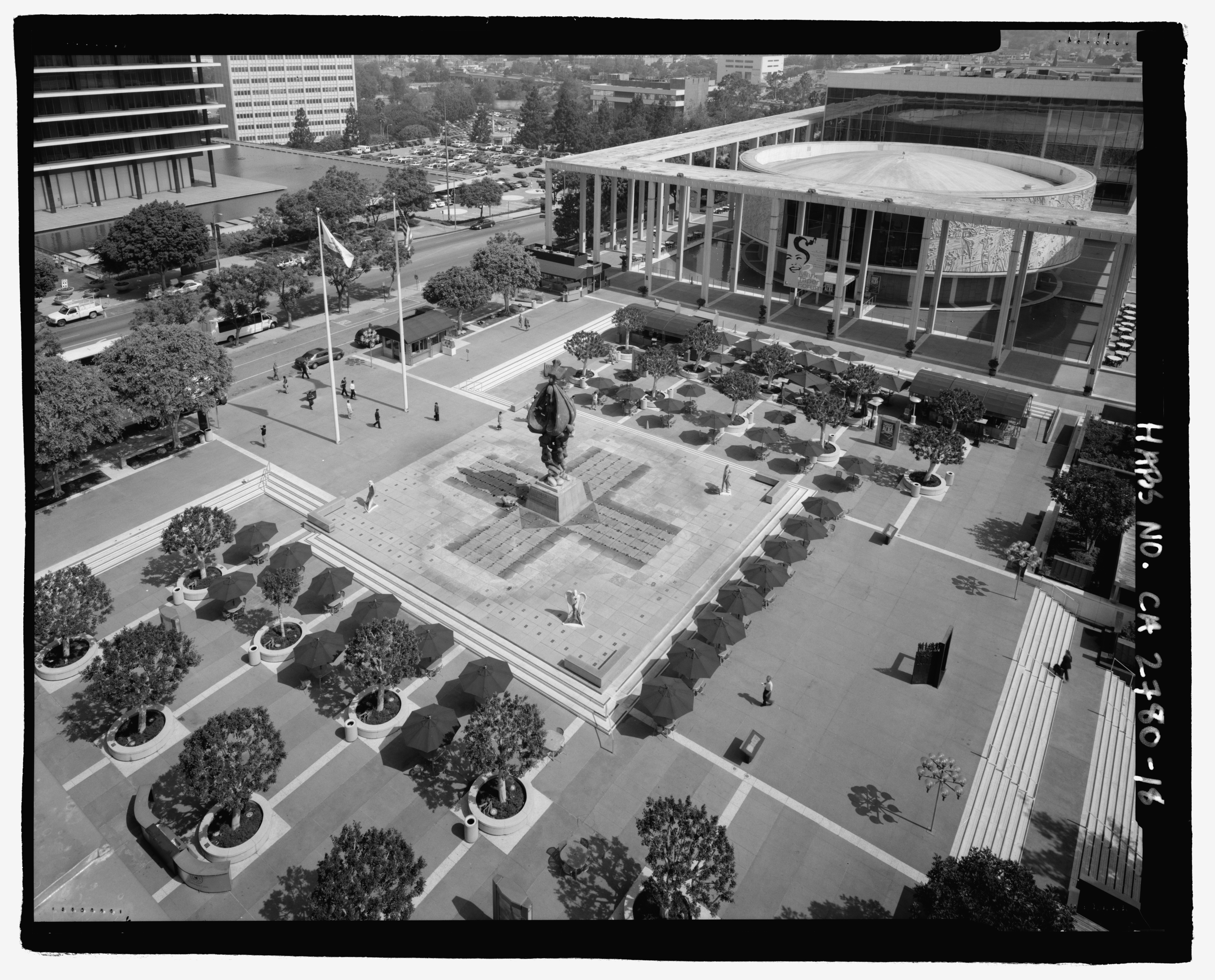

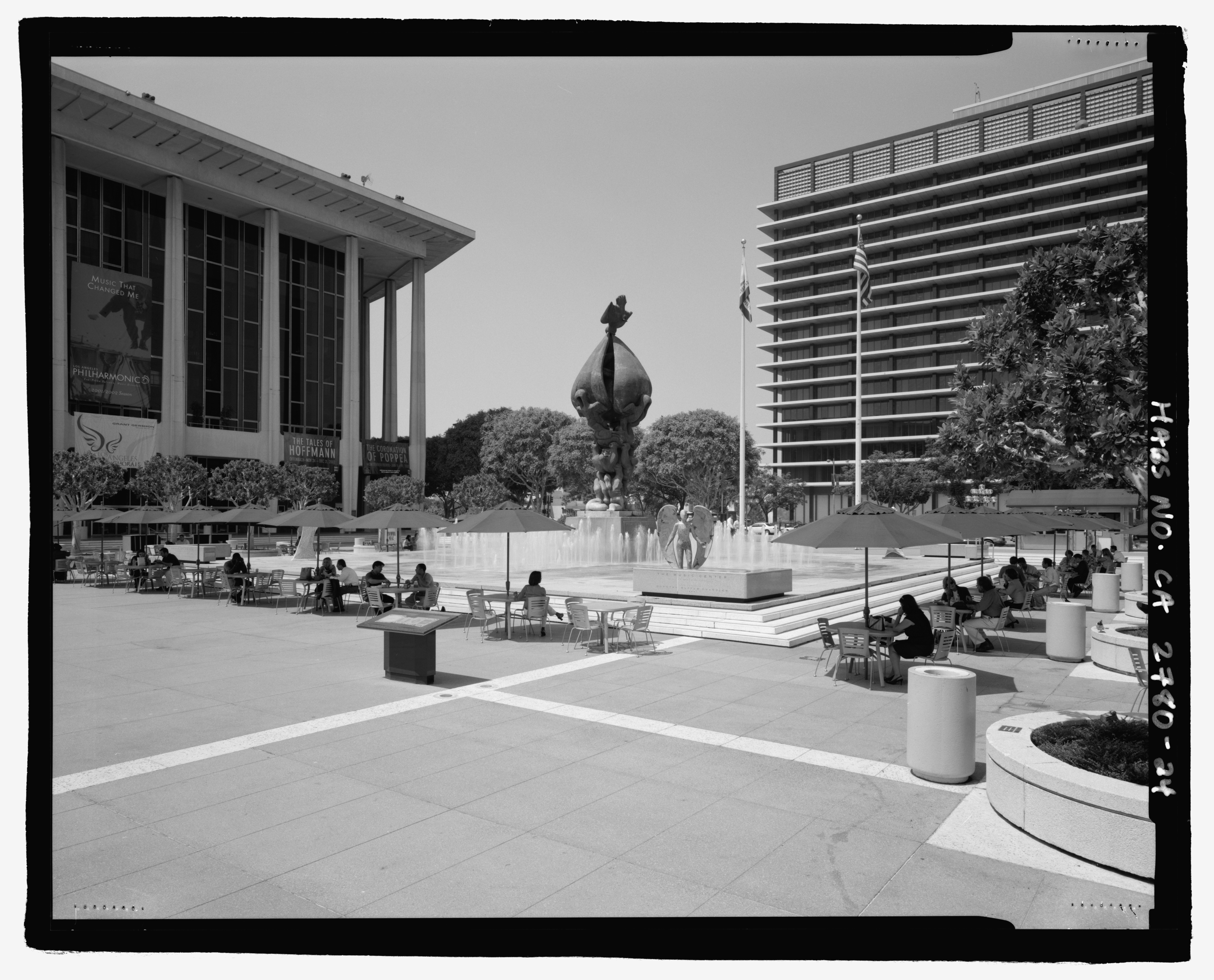

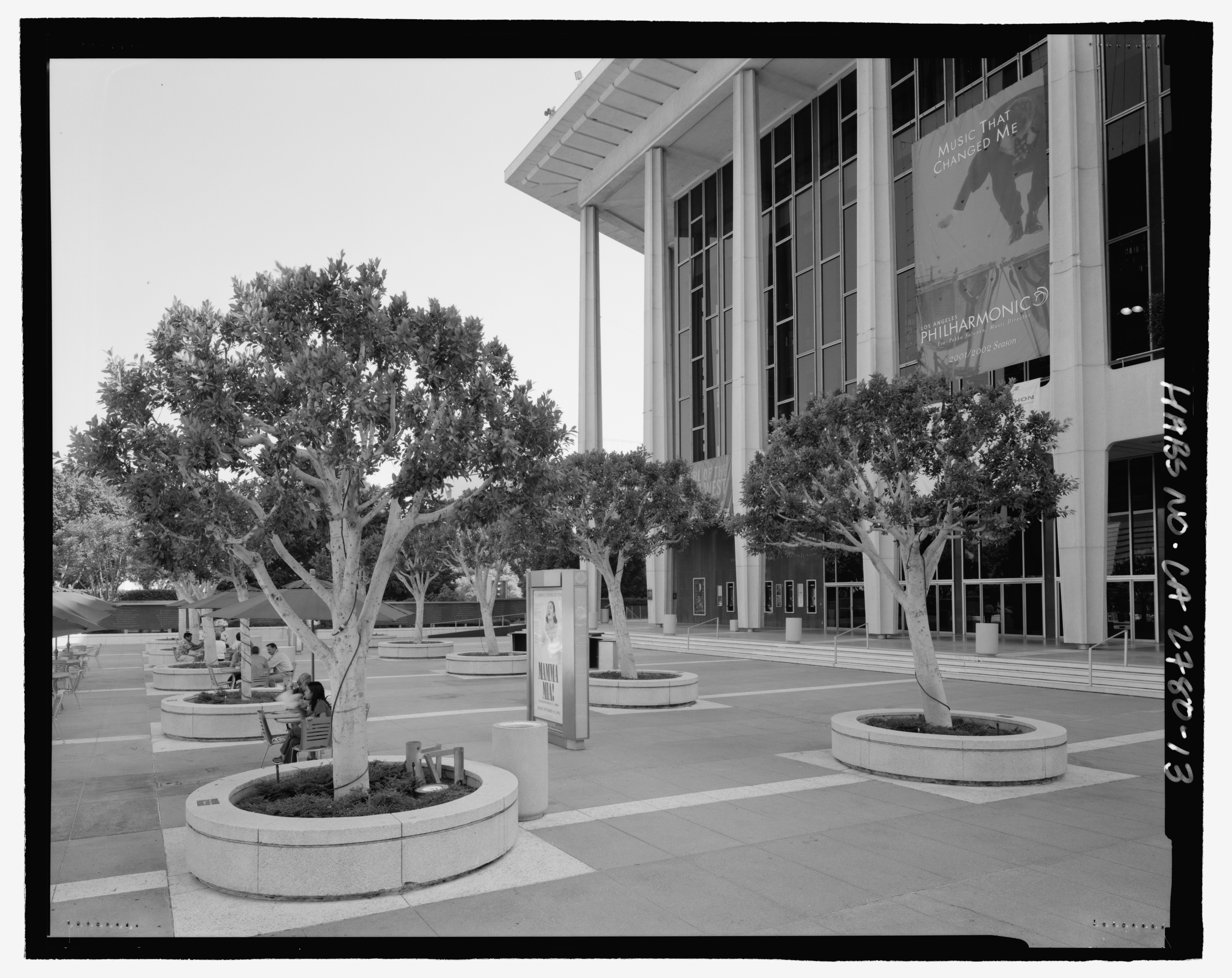

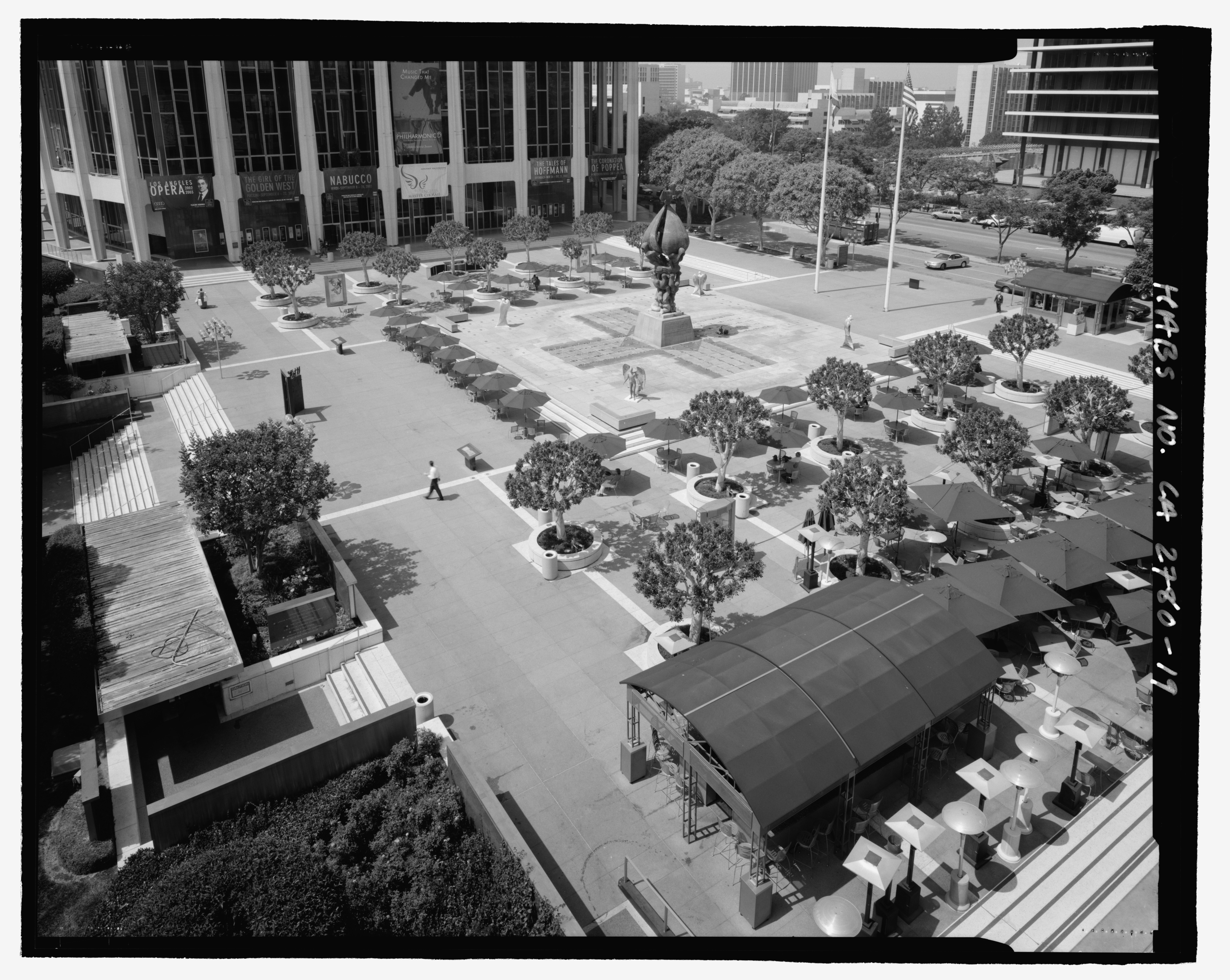

== Public art ==
The 10-ton, 29-foot bronze sculpture Peace on Earth (1969 by Jacques Lipchitz, a Cubist sculptor who fled the Nazi occupation of Paris, was dedicated on May 4, 1969, and originally installed as the focal point of the Music Center plaza. His mammoth bronze sculpture shows a dove descending to Earth as a spirit of peace, further symbolized by a Madonna standing inside a tear-shaped canopy, supported by reclining lambs. Lawrence E. Deutsch and Lloyd Rigler donated $250,000 to commission a work for the fountain. The architects of The Music Center, Welton Becket and Associates, opposed placing sculpture in the plaza between the Dorothy Chandler Pavilion and the Mark Taper Forum. However, after a two-year search, the Art Committee of The Music Center commissioned Lipchitz. In 2019, the sculpture was re-installed 100 feet west to accommodate a major Plaza renovation to improve accessibility.

Three years after the Peace on Earth installation in 1982, Frederick and Marcia Weisman donated the bronze sculpture Dance Door (1978) by Robert Graham to the Music Center. It consists of an ornamented hollow-centered bronze door hinged on a bronze frame in an open position. The door is constructed of approximately seven welded case panels on each side, containing low relief abstracted figures of dancers.

== Resident companies ==
The complex has four resident companies:

- Los Angeles Philharmonic
- Los Angeles Opera
- Los Angeles Master Chorale
- Center Theatre Group

=== Education ===
Since its inception in 1979, The Music Center and its family programs has served more than 16 million and currently serves nearly 1 million students and teachers each year. The Music Center believes the arts enhance the lives of all people and are crucial to the development of every child. The Music Center-designed curriculum materials are included in art textbooks published by McGraw Hill in use across the country and are also available on The Music Center's website.

Education and family programs include "World City", the "Blue Ribbon Children's Festival", the "Very Special Arts Festival" and the "Spotlight Awards".

=== Active Arts ===
Launched in July 2004 and designed to expand the public's experience associated with the performing arts, Active Arts at The Music Center extends beyond the more formal experience associated with performing arts centers. Active Arts programs engage people from diverse backgrounds and experiences and establishes an ongoing series of admission-free or low-cost recreational art-making events that encourage people to sing, dance, play music and tell stories together just for the sheer enjoyment and love of it.

Active Arts programs cut across cross-cultural boundaries and encourage people to participate for the sole purpose of art-making and include "Dance Downtown", "Drum Downtown", "A Taste of Dance", "Public Practice", "Friday Night Sing-Along" and "The Music Center Holiday Sing-Along".

=== Glorya Kaufman Presents Dance at The Music Center ===
Over the past ten years, The Music Center has developed an dance presentation program, which has established a distinguished reputation – locally, nationally, and internationally. The endeavor began in 2000 with The Music Center's sold-out presentation of the Bolshoi Ballet in its historic production of Prokofiev's Romeo and Juliet as well as new interpretation of Don Quixote.

Since then, The Music Center has presented a broad array of ensembles, including New York City Ballet, San Francisco Ballet, American Ballet Theatre, Dance Theatre of Harlem, Alvin Ailey American Dance Theater, Ballet Nacional de Cuba, Beijing Modern Dance Company, Merce Cunningham Dance Company, Kirov Ballet of the Mariinsky Theatre, Nuevo Ballet Español, Miami City Ballet and Eifman Ballet of St. Petersburg.

== Governance and administration ==
The Music Center is governed by a board of directors chaired by Robert J. Abernethy. The Music Center president and chief executive officer is Rachel S. Moore (2015). The County of Los Angeles owns The Music Center venues and provides funding for the maintenance, operations, grounds-keeping, security and ushers. Revenue from the operation of The Music Center garages offsets these expenses. The Music Center and the four resident companies are responsible for the productions presented in the theatres. The Music Center maintains and operates the buildings and the grounds and oversees occupancy of the theatres, restaurant facilities and The Music Center Archives.

=== Membership groups ===
The Music Center has a number of organized membership groups:

- The Blue Ribbon, founded by Mrs. Chandler in 1968, has a membership of more than 450 women leaders of Los Angeles who champion the performing arts and make substantial financial contributions to the center's community programs and its resident companies annually.
- Center Dance Association (CDA) is dedicated to promoting educational programming related to dance, expanding dance audiences in Los Angeles and creating special events related to dance for the enjoyment and further education of its membership.
- The Music Center Leadership Council (originally known as "Fraternity of Friends"), 1978–2018, consisted of businessmen and entertainment industry leaders who shared an interest in the performing arts and the well-being of The Music Center.
