= Abernethy =

Abernethy may refer to:

== Places ==
=== Australia ===
- Abernethy, New South Wales, Australia, a town
- Abernethy Road, in Hazelmere, Perth, Western Australia

=== Canada ===
- Rural Municipality of Abernethy No. 186, Saskatchewan, Canada
  - Abernethy, Saskatchewan, a village

=== Scotland ===
- Abernethy, Perth and Kinross, a Perthshire village, civil parish and former burgh
  - Abernethy (NBR) railway station, a former railway station in this village
- Abernethy and Kincardine, a civil parish in Inverness-shire, Highland
  - Nethy Bridge, the main settlement in this parish, formerly known as Abernethy
  - Abernethy Forest, a forest and national nature reserve
  - Presbytery of Abernethy, part of the Church of Scotland

=== Elsewhere ===
- Abernethy Bridge, Oregon, US, spanning the Willamette River
- Abernethy Flats, a gravel plain in Antarctica

== Other uses ==
- Abernethy (surname)
- Lord of Abernethy, a Scottish title of nobility
- Abernethy (charity)
- Abernethy biscuit, developed by London surgeon John Abernethy
- Abernethy v Mott, Hay and Anderson, a 1974 UK labour law case

== See also ==
- Meg of Abernethy (1355–1405), Scottish harper at the royal court, earliest known Scottish female harper
