= Bruce Abernethy (disambiguation) =

Bruce Abernethy (born 1962) is an Australian TV sports presenter and former Australian rules footballer.

Bruce Abernethy may also refer to:

- Bruce Abernethy (speedway rider) (1926–1999), New Zealand speedway rider
- Bruce Abernethy (cricketer) (born 1958), New Zealand cricketer
