= Jerry Moss Plaza =

Urban square in Los Angeles, California, U.S.

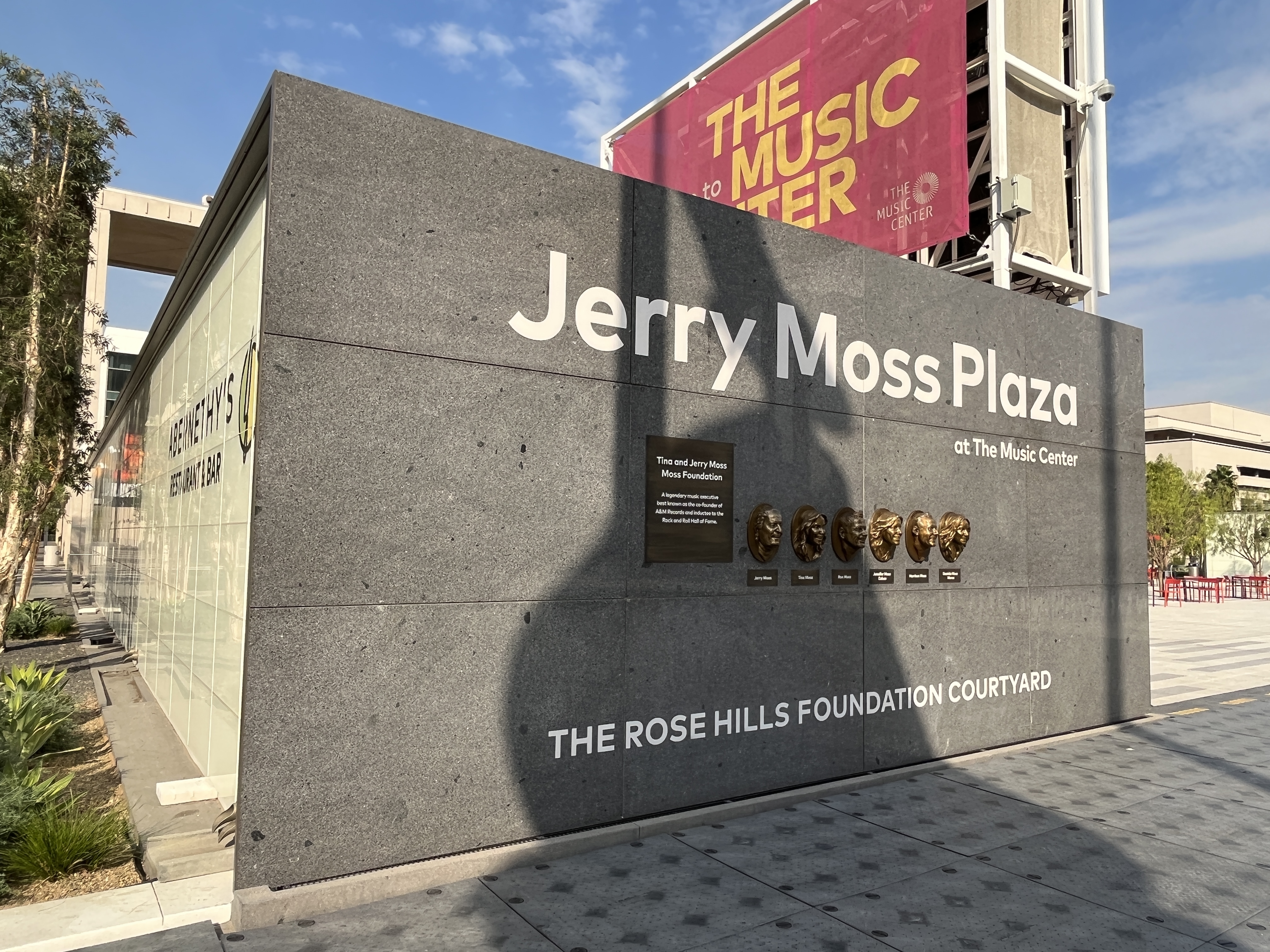
- Plaza signage, 2022

- Location within the Los Angeles metropolitan area
- Coordinates: 34°3′27.28″N 118°14′45.59″W

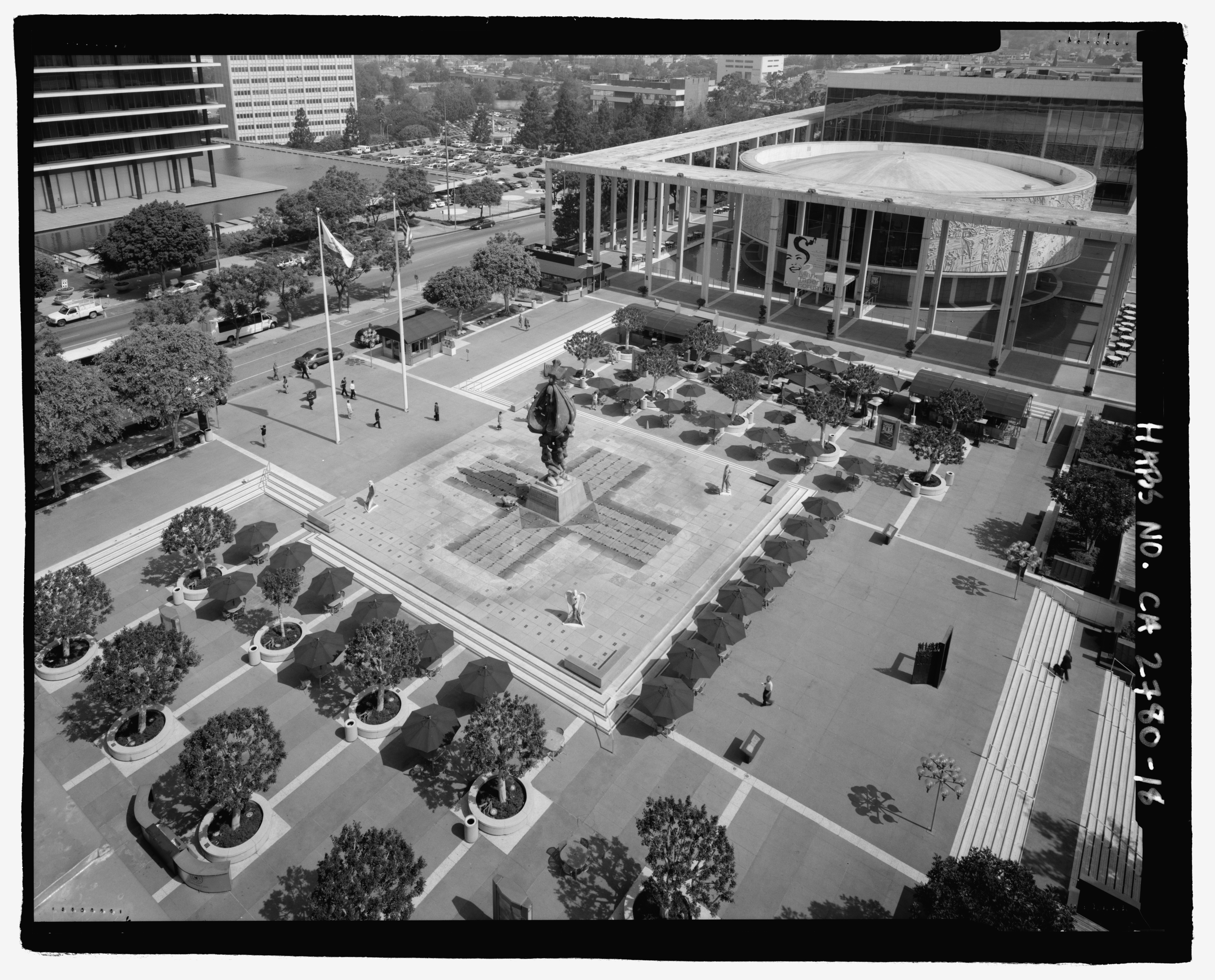
Aerial view

Jerry Moss Plaza is an outdoor plaza in the Los Angeles Music Center, in the U.S. state of California. Named after Jerry Moss, the plaza has hosted concerts, festivals, film screenings, galas, and dance parties. It has two large LED screens. The plaza was "newly refurbished" as of 2021.
