= Thomas Abernethy =

Thomas Abernethy may refer to

- Thomas Abernethy (explorer) (1803–1860), Scottish seafarer, gunner in the Royal Navy, and polar explorer
- Thomas Perkins Abernethy (1890–1975), American historian of early American history
- Thomas Abernethy (politician) (1903–1998), American politician
- Tom Abernethy (born 1954), American professional basketball player

== See also ==
- Abernethy (surname)
