= International Refugee Assistance Project =

US non-profit organization

- Abbreviation: IRAP
- Predecessor: International Refugee Assistance Project at the Urban Justice Center
- Formation: Tax-exempt since August 2018; 7 years ago
- Type: 501(c)(3)
- Tax ID no.: EIN: 822167556
- Purpose: "to create a world where refugees and all people seeking safety are empowered to claim their right to freedom of movement and a path to lasting refuge."
- Headquarters: New York City
- Locations: Washington, D.C. Amman Beirut Berlin
- Executive Director: Becca Heller
- President: Sharif Aly
- Director of Disability Inclusion and Accessibility: Elham Youssefian
- Net Assets: 59,325,782 USD (2024)
- Revenue: 23,812,978 USD (2024)
- Expenses: 28,154,321 USD (2024)
- Website: www.refugeerights.org
- Formerly called: Iraqi Refugee Assistance Project

The International Refugee Assistance Project (IRAP) works to organize law students and lawyers to develop and enforce legal and human rights for refugees and displaced persons. It was originally a project of the Urban Justice Center in New York City, founded and directed by Becca Heller. On December 23, 2018, IRAP became an independent 501(c)(3) organization.

IRAP has offices in New York City, Jordan, and Lebanon. IRAP is a plaintiff in International Refugee Assistance Project v. Trump and co-counsel in Darweesh v. Trump.

IRAP's board includes Robert J. Abernethy, Ahilan Arulanantham, Mazen Darwish, Zainab Salbi.
