= Elham Youssefian =

Iranian-American climate and disability advisor

- الهام یوسفیان
- Born: Iran
- Education: London School of Economics
- Occupations: Human rights lawyer and disability rights advocate
- Employer(s): Danish Refugee Council; International Disability Alliance; International Refugee Assistance Project; International Refugee Assistance Project

Elham Youssefian (Persian: الهام یوسفیان) is an Iranian human rights lawyer and disability rights advocate. She has worked for the International Disability Alliance (IDA) and the International Refugee Assistance Project. She campaigns for disability inclusion in climate change research and planning,

== Biography ==
Youssefian was born in Iran. She is blind. Youssefian holds a Masters degree in Human Rights Law from the London School of Economics (LSE). After graduating, she practiced criminal law and family law in Iran.

Youssefian advocated for the adoption of the United Nations Convention on the Rights of Persons with Disabilities by the Government of Iran in 2008. Youssefian led the documenting of violations of disability rights in Iran and worked as a protection officer with Danish Refugee Council serving Afghan refugees in Iran until 2015.

In 2015, Youssefian emigrated to the New York, United States. From 2019 to 2023 she was employed as Inclusive Humanitarian Action and Disaster Risk Reduction Advisor to the International Disability Alliance (IDA), a global network of over 1,100 organisations representing people with disabilities. In 2024, Youssefian joined the US based non-profit organization International Refugee Assistance Project as Director of Disability Inclusion and Accessibility. She is co-chair of the Reference Group on Inclusion of Persons with Disabilities in Humanitarian Action.

Youssefian has highlighted the need for more intersectional and disability inclusive climate change research and planning, particularly as climate change has a disproportionate impact on persons with disabilities. She has challenged a lack of accessibility at international events, including the 2022 United Nations Climate Change Conference (COP27) where she found it difficult to read draft resolutions. She also spoke at the side event "Disability Inclusion in Climate Action" at the conference. During the 2023 United Nations Climate Change Conference (COP28) she was one of the three speakers at a panel to promote the inclusion of persons with disabilities in the Work Programme on Just Transition Pathways.

Youssefian joined the International Refugee Assistance Project as director of Disability Inclusion and Accessibility in March 2024. In 2025, Youssefian highlighted the "crisis within a crisis" for people with disabilities in the Russo-Ukrainian War. She has written on the lives of disabled refugees in America for media outlet Common Dreams.

== Awards ==
Youssefian was named a BBC 100 Woman in 2023.
