= Religion & Ethics Newsweekly =

- Genre: Ethics, religious and spirituality news
- Presented by: Bob Abernethy
- Country of origin: United States
- Original language: English

Production
- Producer: Thirteen/WNET
- Production location: Washington, D.C.
- Running time: 30 minutes

Original release
- Network: PBS
- Release: October 3, 1997 – February 24, 2017

Religion & Ethics Newsweekly is an American weekly television news-magazine program that aired on PBS from October 3, 1997, to February 24, 2017.

== History and content ==
Premiering in 1997, Religion & Ethics Newsweekly was devoted to news of religion and spirituality, along with major ethical issues. The program explored the top moral questions facing the country and profiled notable people and groups in the world of religion and ethics. As of February, 2017, the series has been canceled.

== Production and distribution ==
Religion & Ethics Newsweekly had been produced by Thirteen/WNET in New York City, New York, since its premiere, and was filmed on location worldwide. The main studio was in downtown Washington, D.C., in the same building as Reuters news agency.

The program was distributed to PBS stations nationwide.

== Host ==
The program was hosted by journalist Bob Abernethy.
