= Becca Heller =

American lawyer

Rebecca Heller is an American lawyer specializing in human rights. She is known for her opposition to the Trump travel ban, and for her work providing legal assistance to refugees through the International Refugee Assistance Project, which she co-founded and directs.

== Education and career ==
Heller is the daughter of a physician and a teacher and she grew up in Piedmont, California. She was a rebellious high school student, often skipping classes, competing for a different school's debate team, and graduating late because of a missed physical education requirement. She graduated from Dartmouth College in 2005 and became a Fulbright Scholar in Malawi, working there on issues of food policy. She earned her J.D. from Yale Law School in 2010 and has worked as a visiting lecturer at Yale Law since 2010. Heller has a daughter.

== Refugee assistance ==
Heller founded the International Refugee Assistance Project in 2008 as the Iraqi Refugee Assistance Project, after encountering Iraqi refugees on a side trip to Jordan during a summer internship in Israel, and learning of their need for legal assistance in obtaining resettlement. She calls herself "an intensely neurotic and self-critical Jew", and has likened the recent treatment of refugees from the Middle East to the treatment received by Jewish refugees from Nazi Germany.

== Recognition ==
While a student at Dartmouth, Heller won the Howard R. Swearer Student Humanitarian Award of Campus Compact for her work connecting a Vermont homeless shelter with leftover food supplies from local farms.

Heller is a 2010 Echoing Green Fellow. In 2016, Heller won the 2016 Charles Bronfman Prize for distinguished humanitarian work by young Jews, for her work with the International Refugee Assistance Project. She was named Foreign Policy Citizen Diplomat of the Year in 2017, and in the same year won the David Carliner Public Interest Award of the American Constitution Society. In 2018, she was given a MacArthur "Genius" Fellowship. Heller has also been named one of the Christian Science Monitor's "30 under 30" change makers, and is a member of the Council on Foreign Relations.
