= Darrell Abernethy =

American pharmacologist

Darrell R. Abernethy
- Born: November 2, 1949; Beloit, Kansas
- Died: November 18, 2017 (aged 68); Annapolis, Maryland
- Education: University of Kansas
- Scientific career
- Fields: Pharmacology
- Workplaces: Johns Hopkins School of Medicine

Darrell R. Abernethy (1949–2017) was an American pharmacologist who was the associate director for drug safety in the Office of Clinical Pharmacology at the Food and Drug Administration.

== Career ==
Abernethy received a M.D. and Ph.D. for pharmacology at the University of Kansas School of Medicine in 1976. He then continued his clinical training in internal medicine at Jackson Memorial Hospital and the University of Miami through board certification and followed with post-doctoral fellowship training for clinical pharmacology at the Massachusetts General Hospital. In 1981, Abernethy became the assistant professor of psychiatry and medicine at Tufts University School of Medicine. In 1983, he moved to Baylor College of Medicine and advanced as an associate professor of medicine in the division of hypertension and clinical pharmacology. He then moved to Brown University School of Medicine in 1986 as the chief of the division of clinical pharmacology, and later was promoted as the professor of medicine. He was the former Francis Cabell Brown Professor and the director of the division of clinical pharmacology at Georgetown University School of Medicine from 1994 to 1999. He then became the chief of the laboratory of clinical investigation at the National Institute on Aging until 2007. Abernethy died on Nov 18, 2017 from advanced pancreatic cancer.

== Research interests ==
Abernethy contributed to understanding of mechanisms of peripheral distribution for drugs and drug disposition and effect in obesity, the knowledge base in pharmacokinetic or pharmacodynamic relationships for cardiovascular drugs in aging. He improved the concept of aging with his research that the pathophysiology of aging must be considered interpreting the drug effects on aged patient. His last research was on the role of genetic polymorphisms of drug effectors with effective responses to cardiovascular drugs. Moreover, to better quantify the effects of multiple medications on functional performance in older adults, he was developing a Drug Burden Index.

== Publications ==
- Abernethy DR, Woodcock J, Lesko LJ: Pharmacological mechanism-based drug safety assessment and prediction. Clin Pharmacol Ther 89:793-797 (2011)
- Abernethy DR, Bai JP, Burkhart K, Xie HG, Zhichkin P: Integration of diverse data sources for prediction of adverse drug events. Clin Pharmacol Ther 90:645-646 (2011)
- He Y, Toldo L, Burns G, Tao C, Abernethy DR: A 2012 Workshop: Vaccine and drug ontology in the study of mechanism and effect J Biomed Semantics;3:12 (2012)
- Zhichkin PE, Athey BD, Avigan MI, Abernethy DR: Needs for an expanded ontology-based classification of adverse drug reactions and related mechanisms. Clin Pharmacol Ther;91:963-965 (2012)
- Bai JP, Abernethy DR: Systems pharmacology to predict drug toxicity: integration across levels of biological organization. Annu Rev Pharmacol Toxicol;53:451-473. (2013)
