= Constance Abernathy =

American architect

- Born: Constance Davies; June 20, 1931; Detroit, Michigan, U.S.
- Died: June 18, 1994 (aged 62); New York City, New York, U.S.
- Education: University of Michigan
- Spouse: J. T. Abernathy

Constance Abernathy (née Davies; June 20, 1931 – June 18, 1994) was an American architect, jeweler, and associate of Buckminster Fuller.

== Architecture ==
Abernathy worked on a special project studying with Buckminster Fuller to create the geodesic dome egg carton form of architecture and functioned as Fuller's secretary maintaining sections of his files and archives. Between 1966 and 1971, she directed Fuller's New York office.

== Jewelry ==
Beginning in 1977, Abernathy became a jeweler. In New York City she befriended and worked with many famous artists. Among her contemporaries were many well-known painters and sculptors such as Larry Rivers, Peter Reginato, Peter Young, Ching Ho Cheng, Ronnie Landfield, and Dan Christensen. Ching Ho Cheng painted her portrait in 1977. In the 1980s, her works started to include precious gems and cast parts she created. Her big bead necklaces were collected by Clarice Cosby and many others. Her works are in the collections of the Cooper Hewitt and Museum of Art and Design.

== Other collaborations ==
Abernathy appears on recordings by John Giorno from the late 1960s and on the live album The Sound Pool by Musica Elettronica Viva, recorded in May 1969.

== Personal life ==
Born in Detroit, Michigan, she attended Cass Technical High School and University of Michigan Architecture school (class of 1953).

She married J. T. Abernathy, a potter and art professor at the University of Michigan, in the 1950s, but their union did not last long. She left Ann Arbor, Michigan for Paris shortly after, arriving in the swinging scene of the Paris 1960s. She worked as an architect in Europe and married a filmmaker.

In the early 1990s, she was diagnosed with cancer and died as a result in 1994. Before she died, she had a farewell party for her closest friends; and she distributed her worldly possessions among them as her way of saying goodbye. She died two days before her 63rd birthday at home in her Chelsea apartment in New York City.

== Archive ==
- Abernathy's papers are available at the Bentley Historical Library, University of Michigan
