= Louis Abernathy and Temple Abernathy =

Oklahoma children who went on cross-country trips

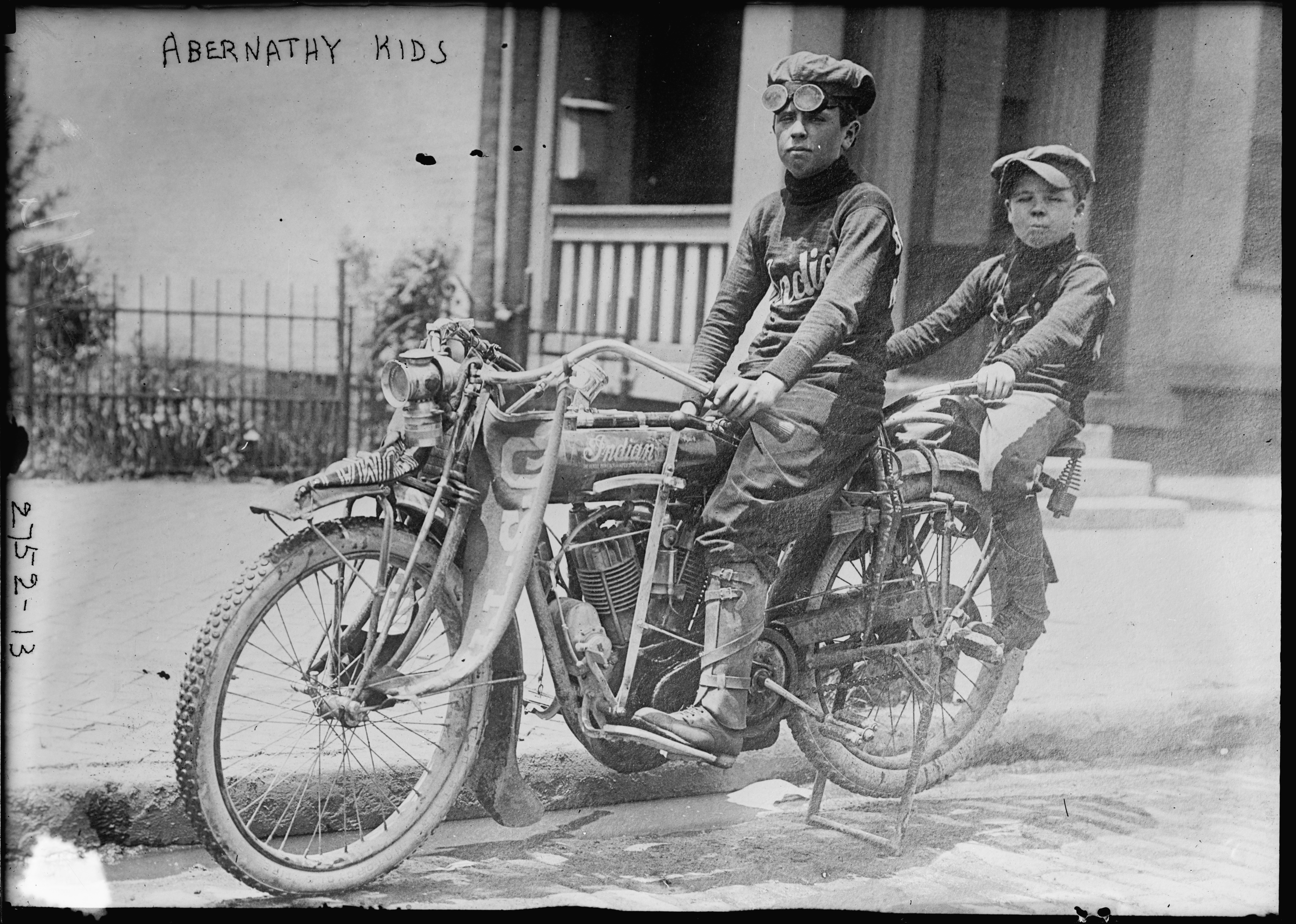

Louis Van "Bud" Abernathy (December 17, 1899 – March 6, 1979) and Temple Reaves "Temp" Abernathy (March 25, 1904 – December 10, 1986) were children from Oklahoma who, without adult supervision, took several cross-country trips. On one trip they rode on horseback from Oklahoma to Manhattan in 1910 when they were 10 and 6 years old.

== Early years and journeys ==
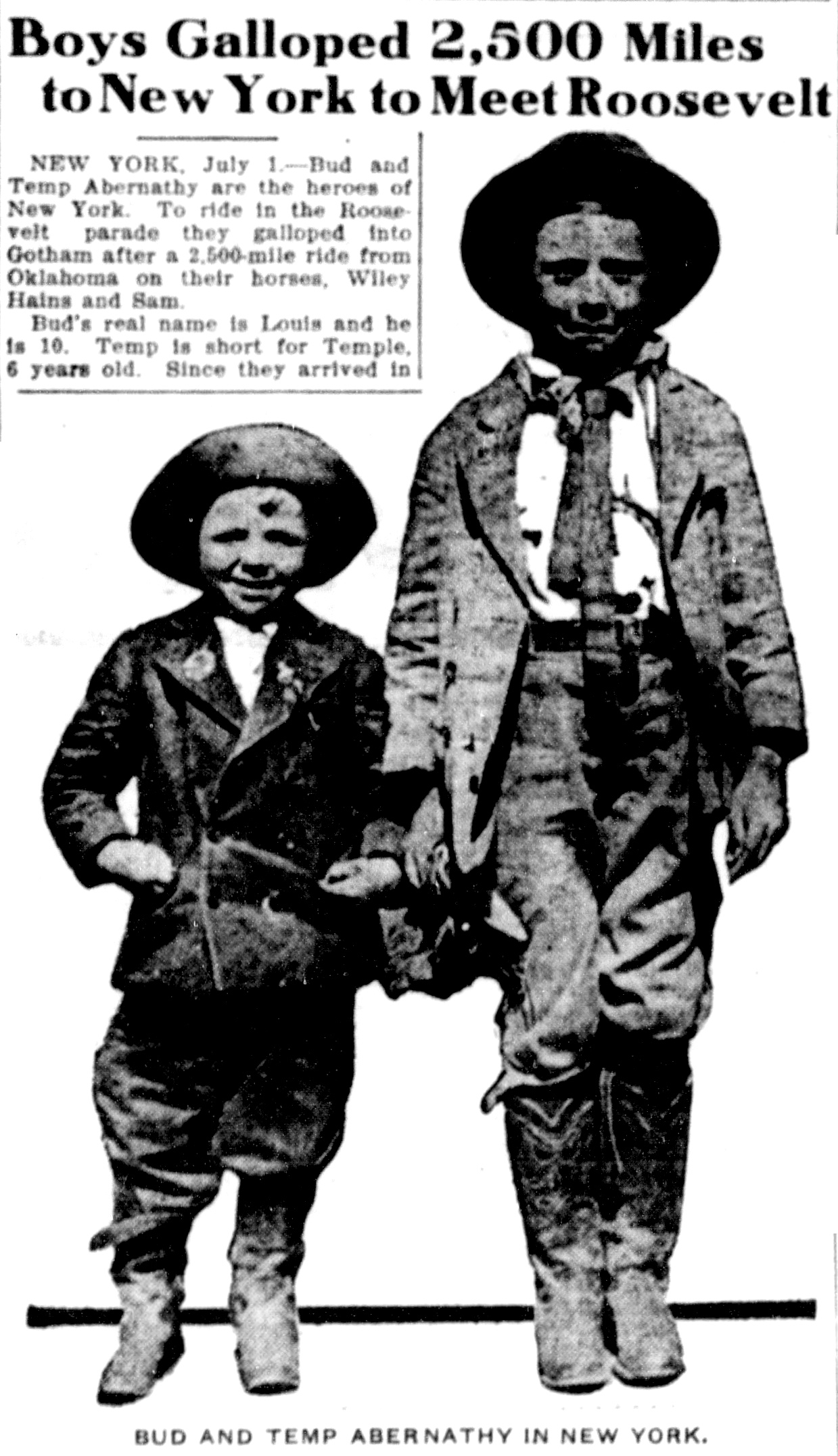
A contemporary newspaper article published after their 1910 trip.

Louis (sometimes styled Louie) Abernathy was born in Texas in 1899 and Temple Abernathy was born in 1904 in Tipton, Oklahoma. Their father was cowboy and U.S. Marshal Jack Abernathy.

In 1909 the boys rode by horseback from Frederick, Oklahoma, to Santa Fe, New Mexico, and back. Louis was nine, and Temple was five.

When the boys completed their Santa Fe journey, they began planning a cross-country horseback ride to New York City, again by themselves, to meet Theodore Roosevelt when he returned from his trip to Africa and Europe. They made that trip in 1910. They were greeted as celebrities, and rode their horses in a ticker-tape parade just behind the car carrying Roosevelt. While in New York, the boys purchased a small Brush Motor Car, which they drove, again by themselves, back to Oklahoma, shipping their horses home by train.

In 1911, they accepted a challenge to ride horseback from New York to San Francisco in 60 days or less. They agreed not to eat or sleep indoors at any point of the journey. They would collect a $10,000 prize if they succeeded.

After a long trip, they arrived in San Francisco in 62 days, thereby losing the prize but setting a record for the time elapsed for the trip.

In 1913, the boys purchased an Indian motorcycle and, with their stepbrother, Anton, journeyed by motorcycle from Oklahoma to New York City. This was their last documented adventure.

== Later years and legacy ==
Louis later graduated from the University of Oklahoma Law School and became a lawyer in Wichita Falls, Texas. Louis died in Austin, Texas in 1979.

Temple worked in the oil and gas business. Temple Abernathy died in Teague, Texas in 1986.

Although they were noted celebrities at the time of their travels, they have almost disappeared from history. Frederick, Oklahoma, celebrates their Santa Fe ride each year and has erected a statue of the boys and has dedicated part of the Chamber of Commerce website to promoting the boys' memory.

== In media ==
Mass media had extensive coverage of the boys at the time of their travels. They were the subjects of the 1910 film Abernathy Kids to the Rescue. Temple Abernathy's widow, Alta Abernathy, wrote Bud and Me, a book about their adventures.
