= Charles F. Abernathy =

American legal scholar

Charles Abernathy
- Born: 1946 (age 79–80)

Academic background
- Education: Harvard University (AB, JD, LLM)

Academic work
- Discipline: Law
- Sub-discipline: Comparative law Legal process
- Institutions: Georgetown University

Charles F. Abernathy (born 1946) is an American legal scholar who works as a professor at the Georgetown University Law Center. He is a graduate of Harvard University and of Harvard Law School.

== Books ==
- Abernathy, Charles F. Civil Rights: Cases and Materials. St. Paul, Minn. : West Pub. Co., 2012 (fifth edition) ISBN 9780314267870
- Shulman, Stephen N., and Charles F. Abernathy. The law of equal employment opportunity. Boston: Warren, Gorham & Lamont. 1990 ISBN 9780791302484
- Abernathy, Charles F. Law in the United States: Cases and Materials. Washington, D.C: International Law Institute, 1995. ISBN 9780935328769
