= Georgina Abernethy =

New Zealand suffragist

Georgina Abernethy (née Shorland, c. 1859–1906) was a New Zealand suffragist and leader of Wesleyan women.

== Early life ==
Abernethy was born in Auckland to a carpenter, John Shorland, and his wife (name unknown). Her life centred around the church, where she played music, taught Sunday school and worked on mission projects. On 10 April 1883 she married Christopher Abernethy, who had been born in the Shetland Islands and emigrated to New Zealand at the age of 16.

== Adult life ==
The Abernethys were posted to a series of short-term positions at Wesleyan parishes around the country. Initially posted to Hokitika, in 1890 they were living in Balclutha and in 1892 in Gore. There, Abernethy became president of the Gore Women's Franchise League. In this role she spoke at a public meeting organised, chaired and addressed by women - the largest number of women to attend any suffrage meeting in the country. She was also involved in the Wesleyan Mutual Improvement Society, and proposed the introduction of a women's night to the Society's meetings.

The Abernethys had four children: Jessie (1885–1920), Thomas (1890–1918), Kenneth (died 1917) and Rex (1891–1965). Both Thomas and Kenneth were killed in action in World War I.

Abernethy died in 1906 in Christchurch aged 47 following surgery.
