= Terence Abernethy =

South African cricketer (1930–1995)

Personal information
- Full name: Terence Abernethy
- Born: 23 August 1930; Pretoria, South Africa
- Died: 27 January 1995 (aged 64); Durban, South Africa
- Batting: Left-handed
- Bowling: Leg break

Career statistics
Competition	First class
Matches	3
Runs scored	17
Batting average	5.66
100s/50s	0/0
Top score	10
Balls bowled	128
Wickets	2
Bowling average	37.50
5 wickets in innings	0
10 wickets in match	0
Best bowling	2/44
Catches/stumpings	1/0
- Source: CricketArchive, 25 June 2016

Terence Abernethy (23 August 1930 – 27 January 1995) was a South African cricketer, who played for Transvaal in first-class cricket. He died in Durban on 27 January 1995, at the age of 64.
