= Abernethy v Mott, Hay and Anderson =

UK labour law case, concerning unfair dismissal

- Court: Court of Appeal of England and Wales
- Citation: [1974] ICR 323, [1974] IRLR 213

Keywords
- Unfair dismissal

Abernethy v Mott, Hay and Anderson [1974] ICR 323 is a UK labour law case concerning unfair dismissal.

== Facts ==
Mr. Abernethy, a civil engineer, claimed unfair dismissal under the Industrial Relations Act 1971, Section 24, from his firm of 20 years, Mott, Hay and Anderson, after declining a secondment to work for the Greater London Council and then being told he was redundant. He was offered £850 in redundancy and £750 ex gratia. They argued he was either redundant or incapable of doing the work the employers wanted him to do.

The Tribunal held he was not redundant, but the employers had shown he was incapable and it was not unfair. The National Industrial Relations Court dismissed his appeal. Unwillingness to work related to capability.

== Judgment ==
The Court of Appeal held the dismissal was fair, and the employer did not act unfairly by failing initially to give the principal reason to the employee for dismissal. Lord Denning MR said the following:

"I turn now to the first point of law which Mr. Pain raises. The employer has under the Industrial Relations Act 1971 to “show” the reasons for the dismissal. That is clear from section 24(6) . It must be a reason in existence at the time when he is given notice. It must be the principal reason which operated on the employers' mind: see section 24(1)(a) . It should, I think, be known to the man already before he is given notice, or he must be told it at the time. But I do not think that the reason has got to be correctly labelled at the time of dismissal. It may be that the employer is wrong in law as labelling it as dismissal for redundancy. In that case the wrong label can be set aside. The employer can only rely on the reason in fact for which he dismissed the man, if the facts are sufficiently known or made known to the man. The reason in this case was — on the facts — already known or sufficiently made known to Mr. Abernethy. The wrong label of 'redundancy' does not affect the point. The second point is whether the reason here was such as to justify the dismissal. Under section 24(2)(a) a reason would be sufficient if it 'related to the capability or qualifications of the employee for performing work of the kind which he was employed by the employer to do.' And 'capability' is stated in section 24(7) to mean 'capability assessed by reference to skill, aptitude, health or any other physical or mental quality.' In this particular case the reason was the inflexibility of Mr. Abernethy and his lack of adaptability. That seems to me to come within his aptitude and mental qualities. He had not the capability for performing the work which he was employed to do. That was a reason sufficient to justify his dismissal."

Cairns LJ held that although the employer was wrong to say he was redundant to begin with, it could reformulate the real reason for dismissal as a different one, and if that was fair, it was valid. An employer could give a false reason because he wished to not hurt the worker's feelings, though he might later have trouble giving evidence that the real reason was fair, and it could constitute a breach of procedural fairness in not giving the worker the accurate charge. Alternatively there could be a mistake of language.

A reason for the dismissal of an employee is a set of facts known to the employer, or it may be of beliefs held by him, which cause him to dismiss the employee. If at the time of his dismissal the employer gives a reason for it, that is no doubt evidence, at any rate as against him, as to the real reason, but it does not necessarily constitute the real reason.

James LJ concurred.
