= Abernathy Field Station =

Outdoor ecology classroom

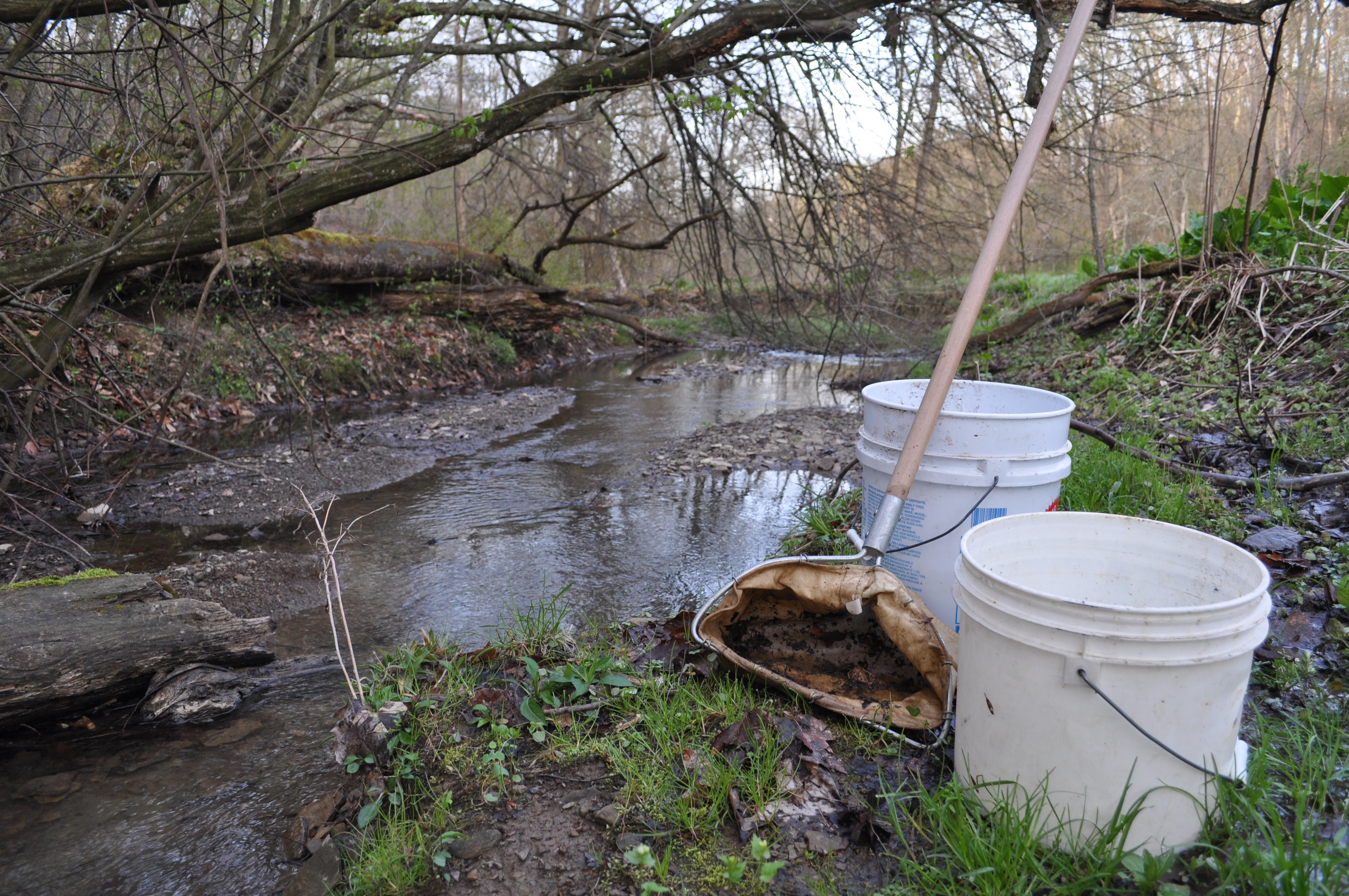
- Sampling at Abernarthy Field Station in 2010. Photo courtesy of Jamie March.

- Location within Pennsylvania
- Location: Washington, Pennsylvania, United States
- Coordinates: 40°8′8.52″N 80°11′7.44″W
- Area: 57 acres (23 ha)
- Operator: Washington & Jefferson College

Abernathy Field Station is a 57-acre (230,000 m^{2}) outdoor ecology classroom serving Washington & Jefferson College (W&J College).

The facility, located 5 miles (8.0 km) southeast from the campus in Washington, Pennsylvania, is home to several different ecosystems, including mixed deciduous forest, conifers, several springseeps, two perennial streams, wetlands, and a mowed field. These ecosystems support a diverse slate of wildlife, including birds, salamanders, fish, small mammals, white-tailed deer, various insects, and over 100 trees. The facility is equipped with a NexSens-brand real-time weather station and stream monitoring system to provide background data for research.

The Abernathy Field Station is operated by W&J College, allowing faculty and students to study the structure and function of the ecosystems and wildlife in it through coursework and independent research projects. Students may not conduct research at the facility without faculty supervision. Access to the land has been provided to the college by Dr. Ernest and Janet Abernathy, and the college has committed itself to preserving the ecological integrity of the land while utilizing it as an outdoor classroom.

In 2008, W&J College received a $1 million grant from the Howard Hughes Medical Institute which would provide funding for long-term ecological monitoring at the Field Station.

== Gallery ==
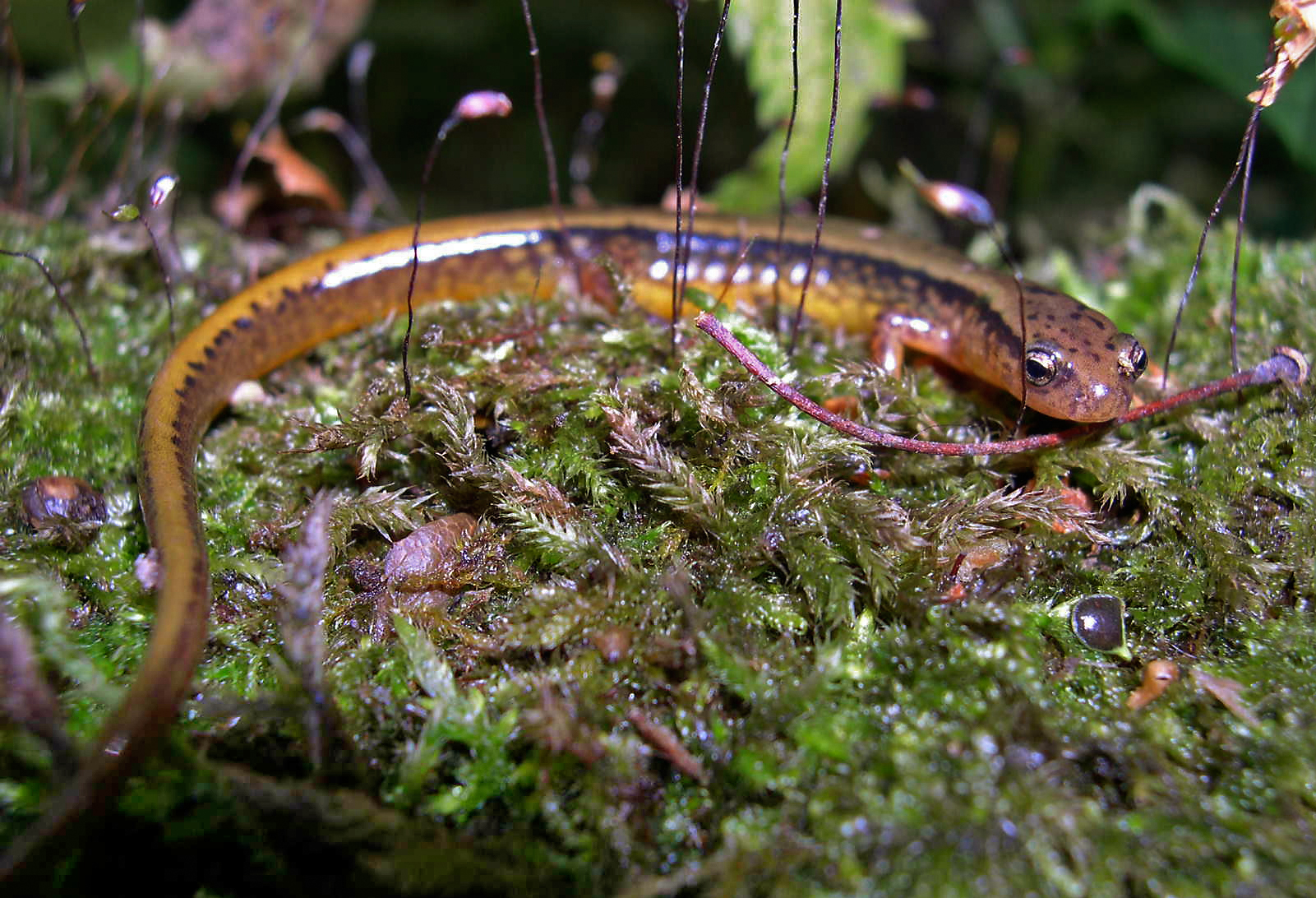
A Northern two-lined salamander (Eurycea bislineata) observed at the station in 2003
