= Bob Abernethy (footballer) =

Australian rules footballer

Personal information
- Full name: Lorne Campbell Abernethy
- Born: 4 March 1900; Shepparton, Victoria
- Died: 1 May 1969 (aged 69); Black Rock, Victoria
- Height: 177 cm (5 ft 10 in)
- Weight: 73 kg (161 lb)

Playing career^{1}
Years	Club	Games (Goals)
1923	Melbourne	2 (0)
- ^{1} Playing statistics correct to the end of 1923.

Lorne Campbell 'Bob' Abernethy (4 March 1900 – 1 May 1969) was an Australian rules footballer who played with Melbourne in the Victorian Football League (VFL).

== Statistics ==
Legend
G	Goals	K	Kicks	D	Disposals	T	Tackles
B	Behinds	H	Handballs	M	Marks

Season	Team	No.	Games	Totals							Averages (per game)							Votes
Season	Team	No.	Games	G	B	K	H	D	M	T	G	B	K	H	D	M	T	Votes
1923	Melbourne	6	2	0	—N/a	—N/a	—N/a	—N/a	—N/a	—N/a	0.0	—N/a	—N/a	—N/a	—N/a	—N/a	—N/a	0
Career			2	0	—N/a	—N/a	—N/a	—N/a	—N/a	—N/a	0.0	—N/a	—N/a	—N/a	—N/a	—N/a	—N/a	0

== Personal life ==
In March 1942, two and a half years after the outbreak of the Second World War, Abernethy enlisted in the Australian Army. Serving as a private, he was discharged on 1 October 1945.
