= Meg of Abernethy =

Meg of Abernethy (1355–1405) was a Scottish musician. She was a harper at the royal court who was recorded in the Aberdeen Burgh Records 1317 and 1398-1407. She is the earliest female harper known in her country and is notable as she indicates that it was possible for women to become professional harp players.
