= Bruce Abernethy (cricketer) =

New Zealand cricketer (born 1958)

Personal information
- Born: 28 May 1958 (age 68); Toowoomba, Queensland, Australia
- Batting: Right-handed
- Bowling: Right-arm medium

Domestic team information
- Years: Team
- 1981/82–1982/83: Otago
- Source: CricInfo, 31 December 2021

Bruce Abernethy (born 28 May 1958) is a New Zealand former cricketer. He played 13 first-class and 10 List A matches for Otago between 1981/82 and 1982/83.

Abernathy was born at Toowoomba in Queensland, Australia in 1958. He studied at the University of Queensland, where he was a university medalist and graduated with a first-class honours degree, before undertaking a PhD at the University of Otago at which time he played top-level cricket for the regional side. His thesis was completed in 1986, on perception in fast ball sports. He returned to Queensland, working at the university between 1991 and 2003 before taking the newly created chair in the University of Hong Kong's Institute of Human Performance in 2004. He remained in Hong Kong until 2011 at which point he returned to Queensland to take up the chair of human movement science in the Faculty of Health and Behavioural Sciences. As of August 2022 he is the executive Dean of the faculty and retains a role as visiting professor at Hong Kong.
