= Jack Abernathy =

United States Marshal

Marshal Jack Abernathy
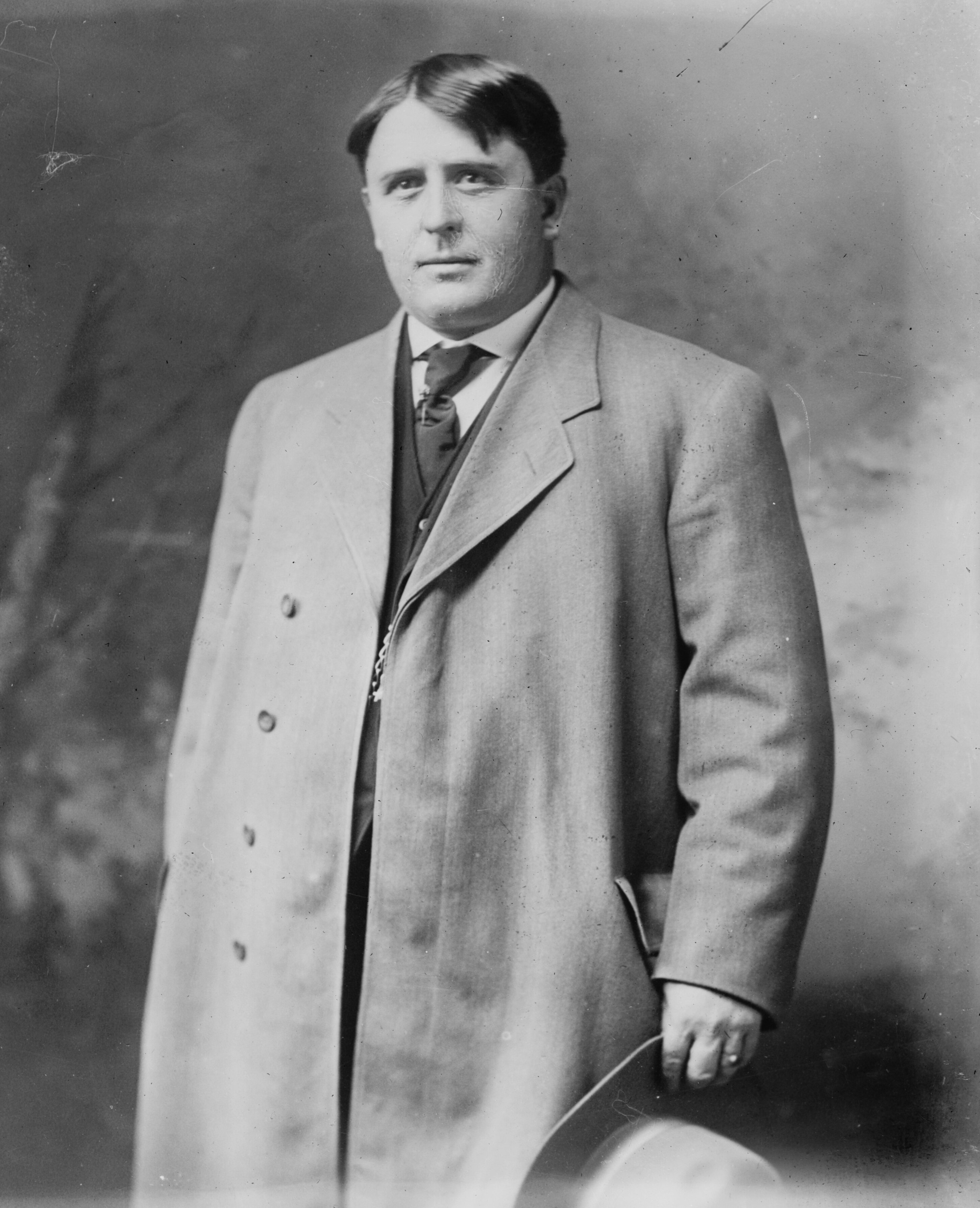
- Born: John Abernathy; January 11, 1876; Bosque County, Texas
- Died: January 8, 1941 (aged 64); Long Beach, California
- Resting place: Wichita Falls, Texas
- Police career
- Department: United States Marshals Service
- Service years: 1906-1910

John Reeves "Catch-'em-alive Jack" Abernathy (January 11, 1876 – January 8, 1941) was an American cowboy, U.S. marshal, and western legend from Bosque County, Texas.

== Early life ==
He was born on January 11, 1876, to Martin Van Buren Abernathy and Kittie Williams in Bosque County, Texas. In 1882 his family moved to Nolan County, Texas, and entered the cattle business. In 1887 at age 11 he worked as a cowboy for the A-K-X Ranch and helped drive a large herd of cattle 500 miles to market at Englewood, Kansas.

== Career ==
To support his family, Abernathy traveled the country catching wolves and sold them to zoos, circuses, and traveling shows. His traveling show caught the attention of President Theodore Roosevelt, who invited Abernathy to go on a wolf hunt with him and some of his colleagues on a ranch in Oklahoma. By the end of the wolf hunt, Abernathy and Roosevelt were good friends. Abernathy spent his time catching wolves until he was the age of thirty when his friend President Roosevelt appointed Abernathy as the federal U.S. Marshal over the Oklahoma Territory on February 8, 1906.

In 1907, his wife died, leaving Abernathy alone with his children. Abernathy resigned his post of U.S. Marshal in 1910 and moved his family to Wichita Falls, Texas, during the oil boom to become a wildcatter.

== Children ==
His children included Louis Abernathy and Temple Abernathy, who rode their horses from Oklahoma to New York City to visit their father and meet Theodore Roosevelt. His last born child was Jesse Pearl Abernathy. Her name was changed to Jesse Pearl after her mother died soon after giving birth. Jesse wrote books and moved to California and was a realtor. Jack Abernathy and his wife, Jessie Pearl, had six children, in the following order: Kitty Joe, the oldest of four daughters, Louis ("Bud"), Johnnie, (daughter), Temple, (son), Goldie, (daughter), and Pearlie, (daughter).

=== Abernathy boys' adventures ===
Louis and Temple Abernathy took their first adventurous ride on horseback from Oklahoma to Sante Fe New Mexico and back, alone and at the ages of 9 and 5. Next was the horseback ride from Oklahoma to New York City. On a bet, they rode from Coney Island, New York, to San Francisco, California, at the ages of 11, and 7. They averaged about 60 miles a day, on the 4,500-mile trip, arriving in 62 days. That broke the only previously known record set earlier by an army officer who'd ridden horseback coast to coast in 182 days.

== Death ==
He died in 1941 in Long Beach, California, and was buried in Wichita Falls, Texas.
