= Robert J. Abernethy =

American entrepreneur and philanthropist (born 1940)

Robert J. Abernethy is an American entrepreneur, real estate developer, and philanthropist based in Manhattan Beach, California. He is the founder and president of American Standard Development Company and Self Storage Management Company, and has been a longtime leader in the self-storage and commercial real estate industries.

Abernethy has served on the board of directors of Public Storage for more than two decades and was inducted into the Self-Storage Association Hall of Fame. In addition to his business career, he has held numerous public service and public policy leadership roles, including as a trustee of the Brookings Institution. He serves as vice chairman of the Board and chair of the Audit Committee for the Atlantic Council. He is a trustee emeritus of Johns Hopkins University and was appointed chair of the board of directors of The Music Center of Los Angeles in 2025.

== Early life and education ==
Robert J. Abernethy was born on February 28, 1940, in Indianapolis, Indiana, and was raised in Davidson, North Carolina. His father, George Abernethy, was a professor at Davidson College, and founded the college's Department of Philosophy. His mother, Helen Abernethy, was an artist who taught art history at Davidson College. Abernethy has one younger sister, Jean Helen Poston.

Abernethy attended Johns Hopkins University, where he earned a bachelor's degree in Mathematics and Electrical Engineering in 1962 and served as president of the student body. During his time there, he was a member of Omicron Delta Kappa and Eta Kappa Nu, the honor society for the Institute of Electrical Engineers. He later attended Harvard Business School, where he took classes taught by Henry Kissinger and Thomas Schelling, and graduated with an M.B.A. in 1968. Abernethy also completed postgraduate work at University of California, Los Angeles, earning a certificate in Construction Management in 1973 and a certificate in Real Estate in 1974.

Prior to beginning his business career, Abernethy entered military service in the United States Navy.

== Military service ==
From 1962 to 1966, Abernethy served in the United States Navy as a Supply Corps Officer. He became a commissioned Supply Corps Officer at the Navy Supply Corps School and completed an 18-month tour of duty in the South China Sea aboard the USS Wiltsie.

Following his overseas service, Abernethy served as the Operations Officer in the Data Processing Department at the Naval Air Overhaul and Repair Facility at Quonset Point, Rhode Island. During this assignment, he studied Tactical Data Systems and NORAD operations at the Cheyenne Mountain Complex.

== Career ==
After completing graduate studies at Harvard Business School, Abernethy worked for the Hughes Aircraft Company from 1968 to 1974, where he was promoted to Controller of the Technology Division, which focused on the design and prototype construction of satellites and spacecraft. Prior to his promotion, he served as Principal Deputy to the Chief Scientist for the AIM-54 Phoenix Missile Program. He was also the Deputy Program Manager for the Iroquois Night Fighter & Night Tracker Program.

In the mid-1970s, Abernethy founded American Standard Development Company and Self-Storage Management Company, which develop and manage commercial, industrial, and self-storage properties in Southern California. He also became Managing Director of Metropolitan Investments, LLC.

Abernethy has been licensed as a California General Building Contractor since 1975. He has been a member of the National Association of Industrial and Office Properties since 1988 and is a member of the Los Angeles Chapter of Lambda Alpha International.

For more than two decades, Abernethy served on the board of directors of Public Storage. He has held numerous leadership roles within the Self Storage Association. Including serving as a director and being elected to national, president, vice president, secretary, and treasurer, as well as past regional president, vice president, secretary, and treasurer. He was inducted into the Self Storage Association Hall of Fame in recognition of his contributions to the industry.

== Education and academic leadership ==
Abernethy has held extensive leadership and advisory roles across major academic institutions.

He is a Trustee Emeritus of Johns Hopkins University, where he serves on advisory boards for the Paul H. Nitze School of Advanced International Studies (SAIS), SAIS Europe, and the Bloomberg School of Public Health. He has also served on advisory boards for the Peabody Institute and the Center for Talented Youth.

Since 1993, Abernethy has served on Davidson College's Board of Visitors where he was elected chairman and later became a Trustee of Davidson college for ten years.

In the Los Angeles area, he has maintained multi-decade service as a Trustee of Loyola Marymount University. He also sits on the UCLA Luskin School of Public Affairs Board of Advisors, the UCLA Health Systems Board and the UCLA School of the Arts and Architecture Board of Visitors.

From 1980 to 1990, Abernethy served as chairman of the Harvard Business School Scholarship Trust.

== Philanthropy and cultural institutions ==
Abernethy has played a long-standing leadership role in major cultural, academic, and community institutions in Los Angeles and nationally, with a particular focus on the performing arts, youth development, and healthcare research.

Abernethy has also been active in civic and educational organizations, including long-standing involvement with the Los Angeles World Affairs Council, where he serves as vice chair, supporting public programming and international affairs education.

In 2025, Abernethy was appointed chair of the board of directors of The Music Center, one of the largest performing arts organizations in the United States. He had previously served on The Music Center Board for more than two decades prior to his appointment as chair.

Abernethy has also held leadership roles with other major performing arts organizations. He has served on the boards of the Los Angeles Philharmonic and the South Bay Civic Light Opera, and has held leadership roles with the Hollywood Bowl and the Los Angeles Theatre Center. He has also served on the board of the Peabody Conservatory.

In youth and community development, Abernethy serves as a director of the YMCA of Metropolitan Los Angeles and is a member of the Board of Managers of the Westchester Family YMCA since 1978. In recognition of his long-term service, the YMCA of Metropolitan Los Angeles awarded him its Golden Book Award in 2019.

Abernethy also supports healthcare research and academic initiatives. He served as a Director of the Albert Schweitzer Fellowship and the John Douglas French Alzheimer's Foundation. He serves on advisory boards for Harvard and Massachusetts General Hospital's Advisory Council for the Center for Surgery, Innovation and Bioengineering and Ronald Reagan UCLA Medical Center. He is also affiliated with the UCLA Chancellor's Cabinet and the UCLA Arts Board of Visitors.

== Public policy and political activity ==
Abernethy has held senior leadership and advisory roles in a range of U.S. and international public policy institutions. He serves as Vice Chairman of the Board, Chair of the Audit Committee, and a member of the Executive Committee at the Atlantic Council. He is also a trustee of the Brookings Institution for the past two decades. He serves on the board of New America and RAND Center for Global Risk and Security. Abernethy also served on the United States Institute of Peace International Advisory Council. He was also a member of the International Institute for Strategic Studies.

He has served as a member of the United States Department of State Advisory Committee on International Economic Policy. He is a member of the Council on Foreign Relations, including participation in its Chairman's Forum, and is a member of the Aspen Institute Society of Fellows. Abernethy is a member of the Board of Trustees of the Meridian International Center.

Abernethy is a founding board member of the Pacific Council on International Policy and serves on the advisory council of the Johns Hopkins School of Advanced International Studies in Washington, D.C., and Bologna, Italy. He is also affiliated with organizations including the Harriman Society, Harvard Partners, and Human Rights Watch.

Abernethy has served in leadership and advisory roles with several national and international policy organizations. He is a director of the Truman Center for National Policy and was part of the Truman National Leaders Council. He is also a founding member of the International Refugee Assistance Project, where he served on its executive board. He has been affiliated with Integrity Initiatives International, an organization dedicated to strengthening accountability for corruption and human rights violations.

Abernethy leads the Center for the Study of Democratic Institutions; a nonpartisan organization focused on democratic governance and institutional reform. He also serves as a publisher of Democracy: A Journal of Ideas, a quarterly political journal focused on public policy and democratic governance.

Earlier in his career, Abernethy held numerous public service roles in California. He was a Transportation Commissioner of the State of California, served as a Commissioner of the City of Los Angeles Planning and Zoning Commission, and a Commissioner on the Los Angeles Telecommunications Commission. He was also a director of the Los Angeles County Metropolitan Transportation Authority and the Metropolitan Water District of Southern California, and served on the California State Board of Education and the California Arts Council. Abernethy also served as a director of the William H. Parker Los Angeles Police Foundation for five decades.
