= Bob Abernethy =

American journalist (1927–2021)

Robert Gordon Abernethy (November 5, 1927 – May 2, 2021) was an American journalist, best known for serving various roles during a 42-year career with NBC News. He later co-created, and was executive editor and host of Religion & Ethics Newsweekly, which aired on PBS from 1997 until 2017.

== Early career ==
Abernethy received his bachelor's and master's degrees from the Woodrow Wilson School of Public and International Affairs at Princeton University. His broadcasting career began in 1951, at WBUD radio (now WFJS) in Morrisville, Bucks County, Pennsylvania.

=== NBC ===
After graduating from Princeton in 1952, Abernethy went to work at NBC News. He was assigned to the network's Washington, D.C. bureau in 1953 and spent two years there before being transferred to London. He returned to Washington in 1958 to report and anchor network news updates. From 1961 until 1963 Abernethy hosted a weekly television news magazine for NBC, Update, which targeted teenagers and young adults. He also anchored the network's coverage of the Northeast blackout of 1965 from its Washington news bureau.

In August 1966 NBC transferred Abernethy again, this time to Los Angeles, and assigned him to anchor evening newscasts at its owned-and-operated television station KNBC. Abernethy anchored at KNBC until 1970, but remained on the newscasts as an interviewer, special correspondent, and commentator. He also served as moderator of a local public affairs program on the station, KNBC News Conference. After 11 years at KNBC, Abernethy left Los Angeles in 1977 and returned to NBC's Washington bureau to report for the Today Show, where he appeared alongside former KNBC colleague Tom Brokaw.

Abernethy took a leave from NBC in 1984 to study briefly at Yale Divinity School in New Haven. He returned to the network a year later to Washington, and in 1989 accepted what would be his final NBC assignment, chief correspondent of the Moscow bureau.

=== Public Television ===
Abernethy completed his Moscow assignment in 1994 and subsequently retired from NBC. He spent the next three years developing Religion & Ethics NewsWeekly for PBS. Using his personal background as part of a family of Northern Baptist ministers, his education at Yale Divinity and having covered religion stories for NBC, Abernethy crafted the program to fill a void in objective reporting of faith-based issues in American television. Religion & Ethics NewsWeekly premiered in September 1997, produced by WNET in New York City and underwritten primarily by a $5 million grant from the Lilly Endowment. An executive there said it was ''one of the largest amounts our religion program has ever made to a single project.''

The program ended in February 2017 after a nearly 20-year run.

== Personal life ==
Abernethy was married to Marie Cheremeteff Grove. He has one daughter with his first wife Jean Montgomery who died in 1980; one daughter with Grove; one stepdaughter, and three stepsons. He lived in Brunswick, Maine after many years living between Washington, D.C., and Jaffrey, New Hampshire. Abernethy and his wife were ordained members of the United Church of Christ. He died from natural causes in May 2021, at the age of 93.

== Awards ==
- Wilbur Awards (2009) - awarded by the Religion Communicators Council (RCC)
- James Parks Morton Interfaith Award (2015)
- Honorary Degree from Governors State University at the 46th commencement ceremony in 2017.
