= Bellerophon Taming Pegasus =

Sculpture by Jacques Lipchitz

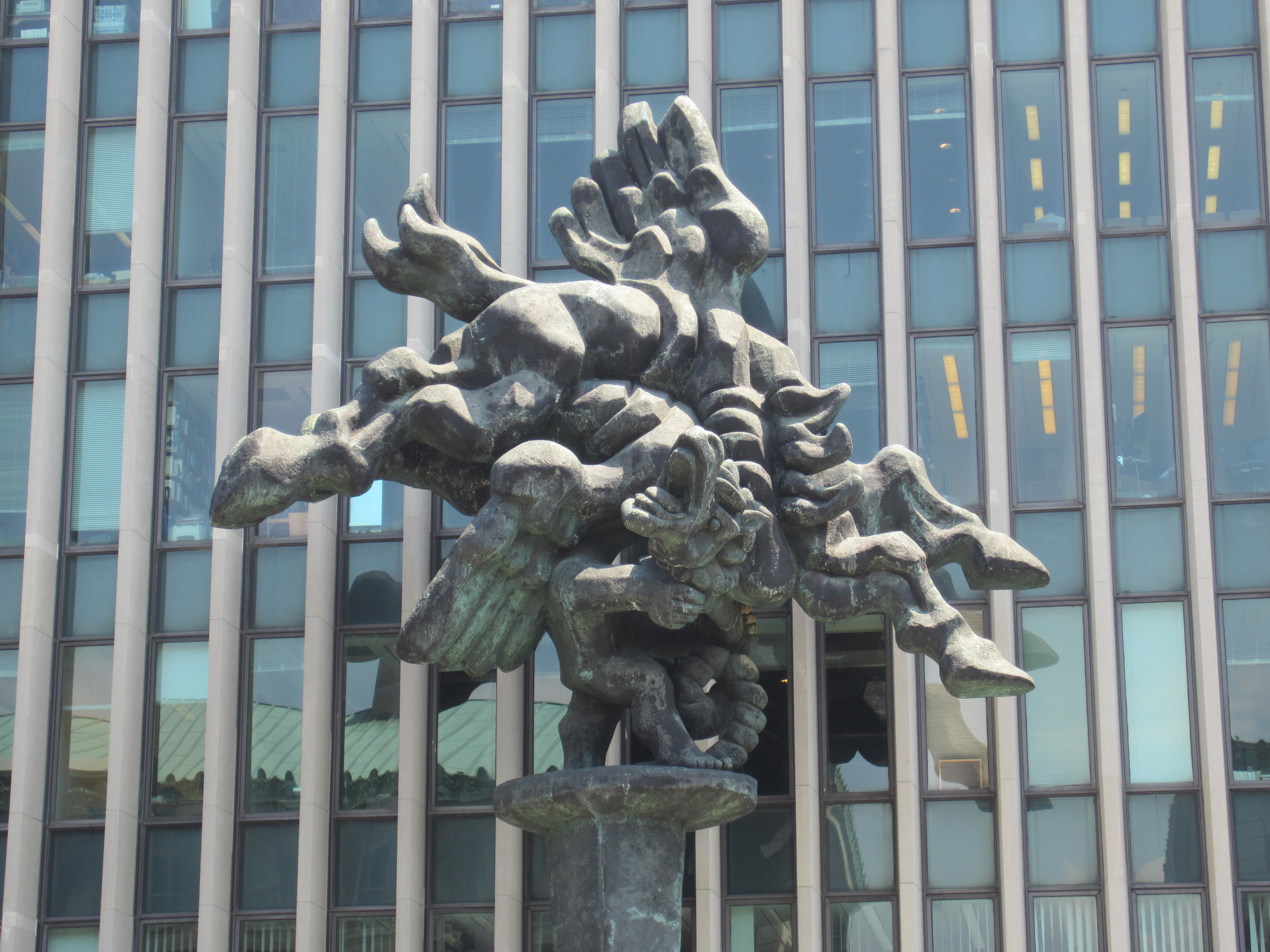
- The sculpture in 2014
- Artist: Jacques Lipchitz
- Year: 1977
- Type: Sculpture
- Subject: Bellerophon taming Pegasus
- Location: New York City; 40°48′25.4″N 73°57′38″W

Bellerophon Taming Pegasus is an outdoor sculpture by Jacques Lipchitz, depicting Bellerophon and Pegasus. It was the final sculpture worked on by Lipchitz, and was completed after his death in 1973.

The work depicts the human figure of Bellerophon, standing on a high plinth, tying a rope around the neck of the thrashing Pegasus, whose tail, legs and wings splay dramatically around the central figures. It has been interpreted as representing man's taming nature.

== Background and inspiration ==
Jacques Lipchitz was a Lithuanian-born French-American Cubist sculptor born in August 1891. Moving to Paris in 1909, he joined the avant-garde scene, he was a leading Cubist sculptor. During this time, Lipchitz met Pablo Picasso whose cubist works and philosophy inspired the work. By the time he had fled from the Nazi-occupied France and moved to New York, he shifted to making larger-scale sculptures distinguished by highly-expressive Baroque-like grandeur.

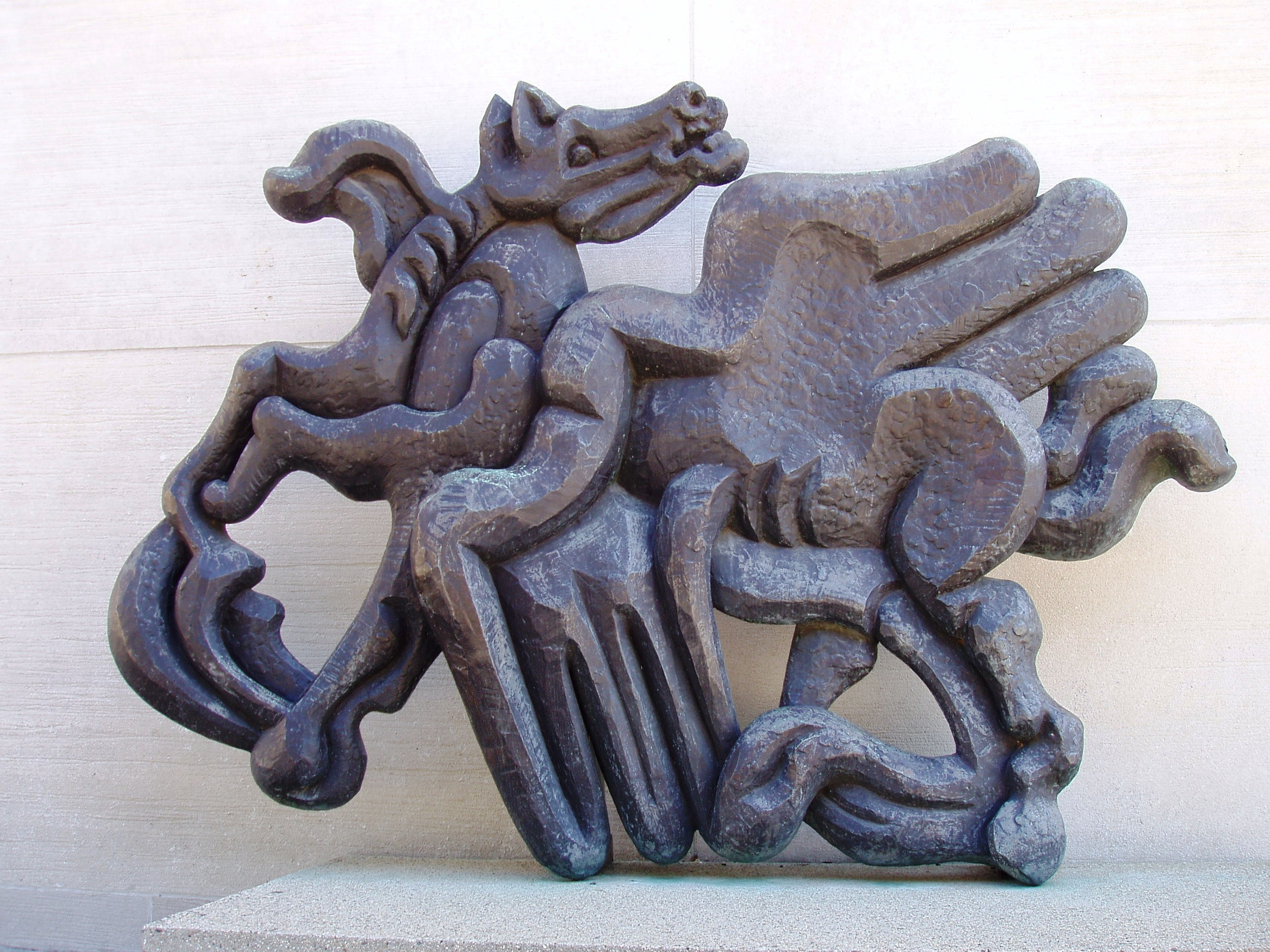
Jacques Lipchitz, Birth of the Muses, 1944-1950, MIT Campus, Cambridge, Massachusetts

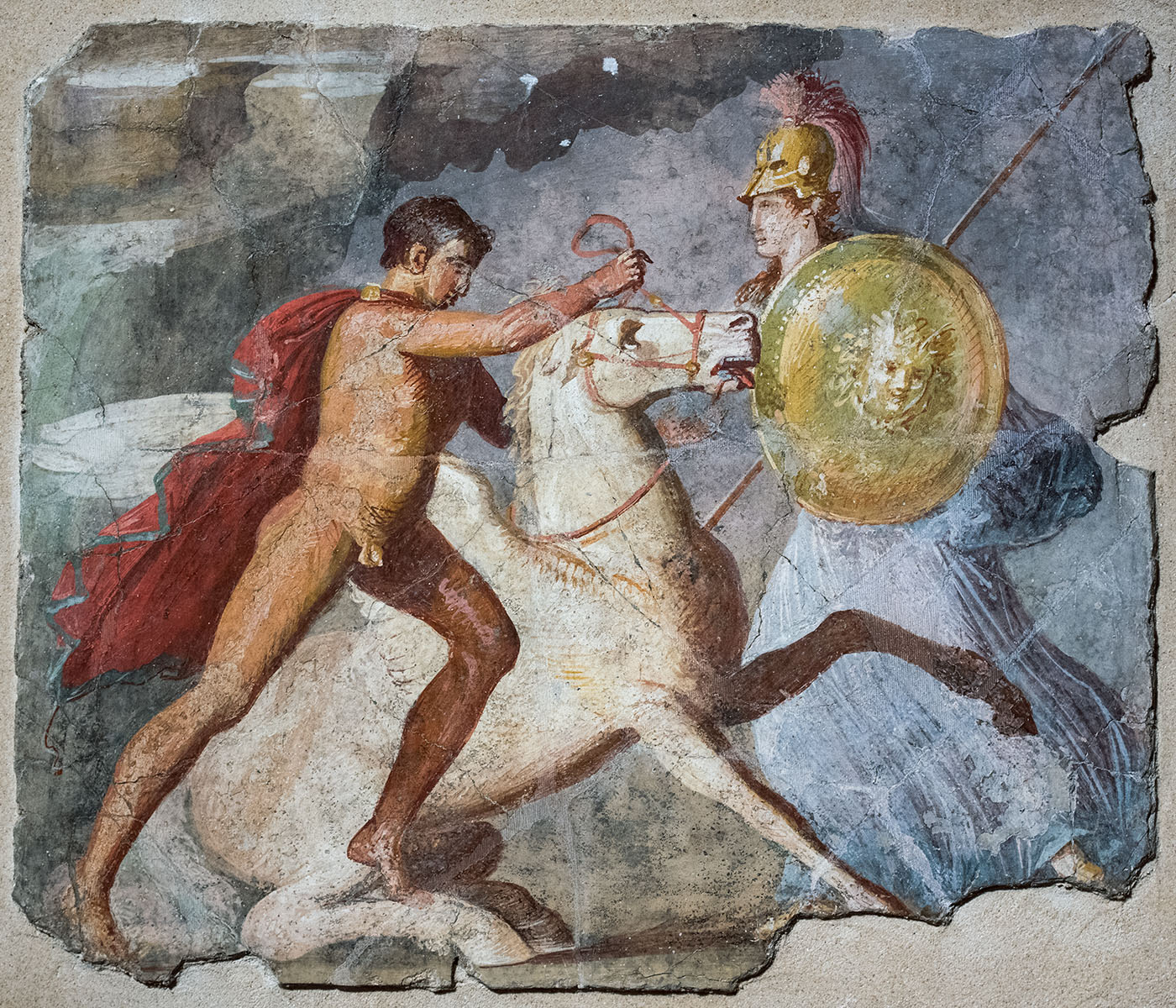
Bellerophon, Pegasus, and Athena. Pompeian fresco from first half of the 1st century.

Bellerophon was an ancient Greek mythical hero who is sent to kill the Chimera, a fire-breathing beast roaming the countryside, to redeem him from exile. After given clairvoyant advice from the seer Polyidus, goes to tame the Pegasus, the winged horse that is the spawn of Medusa. After given a vision of a golden bridle by Athena which aids him in taming the Pegasus, Bellerophon slays the Chimera. After his victory is met with disbelief, he goes on to succeed in many more trials. After these trials, Bellerophon pridefully convinces himself that he can fly up to Olympus; while doing so, Zeus intervenes causing him to fall down to Earth and die.

His work takes inspiration from Lipchitz's earlier work, Birth of the Muses, which depicts Pegasus landing on Mount Olympus generating the four springs of which the Muses were born. Bellerophon Taming Pegasus renders the subject in a much more chaotic and volumetric compared to the horizontally-oriented relief of Birth of the Muses.

== Subject ==
As the name suggests, the work features Bellerophon tying a rope to the Pegasus, who is seen frantically resisting the hero's attempts to subdue him. The Pegasus' legs are thrown out in a volumetric mass connected by its contorted torso. The scene is intense, frenzied, and chaotic in composition but is balanced by the serene nature of Bellerophon.

== Commission and installation ==
The sculpture was commissioned by architect Max Abramovitz for Columbia Law School in 1964. When commissioned to make the sculpture, Lipchitz asserted to his patron to not "expect a blinded lady with scales and all those things from me ... I will try to think of something else." It was cast in bronze at Pietrasanta in Italy, shipped in pieces to be constructed in New York City, and dedicated on November 28, 1977. Widow Yulla Lipchitz, oversaw the final casting of the piece as her husband had died May 26, 1973. It is installed above the west entrance of Jerome Greene Hall on Revson Plaza, on the Columbia University campus in Manhattan. Nearby on the plaza are casts of Henry Moore's Three-Way Piece: Points, Tightrope Walker by Kees Verkade, Life Force by David Bakalar, and Flight by Gertrude Schweitzer.

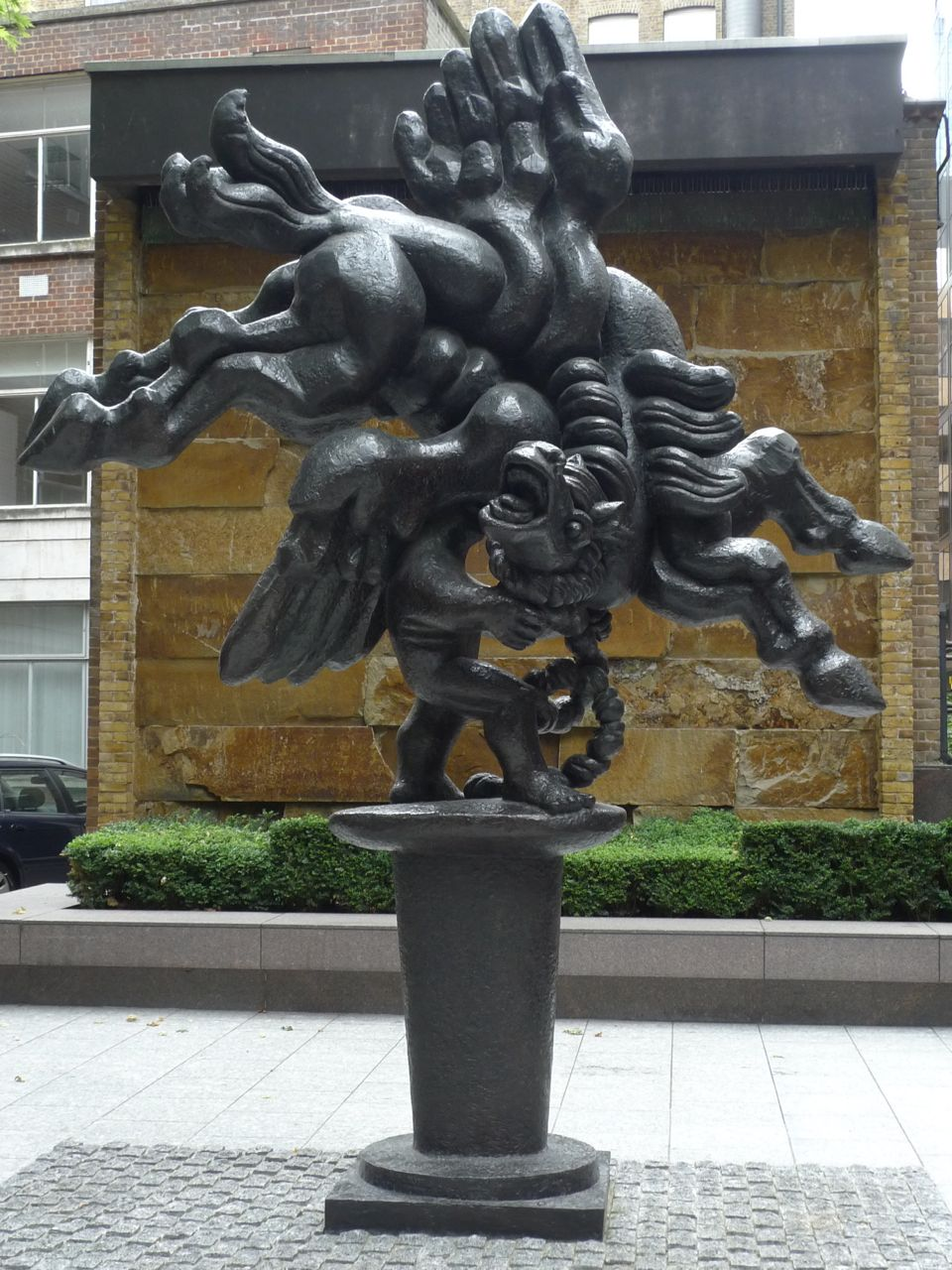
Bellerophon Taming Pegasus at Broadgate Estate in London

Its placement near the Jerome Green Hall, a modern building composed of repeated vertical beams, provides contrast to the chaotic sculpture. The mythological theme connects to the neo-classical architecture of Philosophy Hall.

The 23 ton sculpture measures approximately 30 feet (9.1 m) by 28 feet (8.5 m), and stands on a 27-foot (8.2 m) high pedestal, making it, after the Statue of Liberty, the second-largest metal statue in New York City, as of 2022.

The Tate Gallery in London holds a plaster "sketch" or maquette from 1964, presented by the Lipchitz Foundation in 1982. Another 1964 plaster "sketch" is held by the Museo Reina Sofía in Madrid.

A 12-foot bronze cast - about half the size of the original - is at the Broadgate development in London. Another cast was installed in Kansas City in 2000.

== Interpretations ==
A cynical interpretation sometimes suggested of the work involves the focus on the fervent defiance yet eventual submission of the Pegasus. In this analogy, the beautiful Pegasus is symbolic of forces of nature while Bellerophon is symbolic of the Law school or its study, constricting its freedom.

An alternative more-optimistic perspective of the sculpture (better supported by the artist's commentary) is that Bellerophon (representing humanity) is taming the chaotic Pegasus (representing the natural world). Symbolically, man is dominating over the natural state and taming the calamitous nature into formal laws. "These rules," says Lipchitz, "help you to behave, to live, and law is born from that." Similarly, the sculpture may be symbolic of the labors of the sculptor himself, comparing the task of capturing the physical Pegasus to capturing its the Pegasus' form.

== See also ==
- 1977 in art
- List of public art in the City of London
