= List of public art in Monaco =

This is a partial list of public art in Monaco. It includes statues, memorials, monuments, and contemporary works of visual art on public display.

Images may be missing from this list, due to no freedom of panorama provision in the copyright law of Monaco for public artworks.

== By ward ==
=== Fontvieille ===
Image	Title / subject	Location and coordinates	Date	Artist / designer	Type	Material	Dimensions	Designation	Notes
	Statue of Princess Grace	Princess Grace Rose Garden, Fontvieille 43°43′37.98″N 7°25′9.43″E		Kees Verkade		Bronze			
	Le Poing ("The Fist")	Fontvieille Park, Fontvieille		César		Bronze			
	Cavalleria Eroica	Fontvieille Park, Fontvieille	1987	Arman					

=== Larvotto ===
Image	Title / subject	Location and coordinates	Date	Artist / designer	Type	Material	Dimensions	Designation	Notes
	Hexa Grace (The Sky, The Sea, The Land)	Roof terrace of the Auditorium Rainier III, Grimaldi Forum, Larvotto 43°44′17″N 7°25′46″E	1979	Victor Vasarely		Enamelled pumice stone			
	La Petite Sirène (The Little Mermaid)	Promenade du Larvotto, Larvotto beach	2000	Kristian Dahlgard		Metal, Bronze			

=== La Condamine ===
Image	Title / subject	Location and coordinates	Date	Artist / designer	Type	Material	Dimensions	Designation	Notes
	Ulysses	Port Hercules, La Condamine		Anna Chromy					
	Statue of Juan Manuel Fangio	Quai Antoine 1er, La Condamine 43°43′57.04″N 7°25′21.2″E	2003	Joaquim Ros Sabaté		Bronze			Unveiled by Professor Jurgen Hubbert on 23 May 2003.
	Statue of Louis Chiron	Quai Albert 1er, La Condamine							
	Statue of William Grover-Williams	La Condamine	1991	François Chevallier		Bronze			Unveiled by Prince Rainier III in 1991.

=== Monaco-Ville ===
Image	Title / subject	Location and coordinates	Date	Artist / designer	Type	Material	Dimensions	Designation	Notes
	Statue of Prince Albert I	St Martin Gardens, Monaco-Ville 43°43′47.32″N 7°25′26.3″E		Francois Cogne		Bronze			
	Statue of François Grimaldi ("Malice")	Prince's Palace of Monaco, Monaco-Ville 43°43′52.54″N 7°25′14.68″E	1997	Kees Verkade		Bronze			
	Statue of Prince Rainier III	Rampe-Major, Monaco-Ville	2013	Kees Verkade		Bronze			Unveiled by Prince Albert II, Princess Charlene, Princess Caroline, and Princess Stephanie on 18 November 2013.
	Melodie	St Martin Gardens	1984	Arman					

=== Monte-Carlo ===
Image	Title / subject	Location and coordinates	Date	Artist / designer	Type	Material	Dimensions	Designation	Notes
	Monument to Hector Berlioz	Avenue de Monte-Carlo, Monte-Carlo 43°44′18.49″N 7°25′41.43″E	1903	Léopold Bernhard Bernstamm		Marble			Inscribed "On 18 February 1893 the immortal work of Berlioz La Damnation de Faust received its first performance at the Théâtre de Monte Carlo under the auspices of His Royal Highness Prince Albert I of Monaco"
	Monument to Jules Massenet	Avenue de Monte-Carlo, Monte-Carlo 43°44′19.15″N 7°25′40.77″E	1914	Léopold Bernhard Bernstamm		Marble			The monument lends its name to the Massenet corner on the Circuit de Monaco.
	Sky Mirror	Casino Place, Monte-Carlo 43°44′21.81″N 7°25′38.8″E	1999	Anish Kapoor					
