= Nicolas Ioannou =

Cypriot yacht and speedboat manufacturer (born 1965)

- Νικόλας Ιωάννου
- Born: 8 January 1965 (age 61); Cairo, Egypt
- Occupation: Businessman

Nicolas George Ioannou (Greek: Νικόλας Γιώργος Ιωάννου; born 8 January 1965), also known as "Rudy", is a Cypriot yacht and speedboat manufacturer since 1991, and a property developer. He is the CEO of several companies including Coast and Hills Developments. He has investments in hotels and residential towers as well as marina developments. Ioannou has been appointed by the Cypriot president as honorary consul of Cyprus in the Sinai Peninsula.

== Career ==
=== Business ===
==== Boat-racing & Boat-building ====
During the time Ioannou resided in Egypt, he was the national Union Internationale Motonautique president. As a speed boat manufacturer he organised the first red sea rib rally and brought to this event a long list of world class royalty, celebrities, business people and adventurers, and created thereafter a series of events which included the first ever Formula 2 race in the Egyptian Nile, "les 8 heurs du nil".

Rudy, also personally participated in several boat racing events such as the one in Zeebrugge in which he came first place. However boat racing, boat races, and boat building reportedly remain to this day his hobby. In 2007, he moved to Monaco where he stayed in his apartment in Fontvieille to work more closely with the UIM. As for boat building, Ioannou formed his ship building company after having built his first 105-foot steel yacht by the age of 26. He later moved to speedboat and rigid inflatable boat manufacturing where he ended up receiving several awards for retail and military navy contracting. The Italian Navy also endowed him with a high honor award for marine contracting and contribution to their navy fleet of military vessels.

==== Projects in progress ====
Nicolas Ioannou is currently developing several projects around Europe. His company is working on the developments of projects to build a new commercial and residential compound and marina, as well as other several projects to pioneer high rise towers that consist of 5-star luxury apartments and hotels that are said to break the record for the tallest buildings in their countries. Ioannou is undertaking many of these projects reportedly along with his Egyptian and Saudi Arabian billionaire partners who are shareholders within the company.

=== Politics ===
Ioannou was in Egypt during the 2005 Sharm el-Sheikh attacks where he intervened to aid the Cypriot tourists in Egypt at the time. After providing refuge to the surviving victims he was esteemed as a man of resources to aid the Cypriot government in political missions during crisis. This led to his endowment as the Honorary Consul of Cyprus in Egypt where he was able to provide an exit from Egypt to Cypriots who desired to leave the country in a time where Egyptian airports were shut down by the government for security reasons during the 2011 Egyptian Revolution.

=== Real estate ===
Ioannou owns a significant amount of land in Cyprus some of which he inherited. This land was owned by his grandfather before the Turkish invasion of Cyprus in the north. He also owns land in Greece, as well as an island in the Ionian Sea.

== See also ==
- List of richest Cypriots
