= Jacques and Berthe Lipchitz =

1916 painting by Amedeo Modigliani

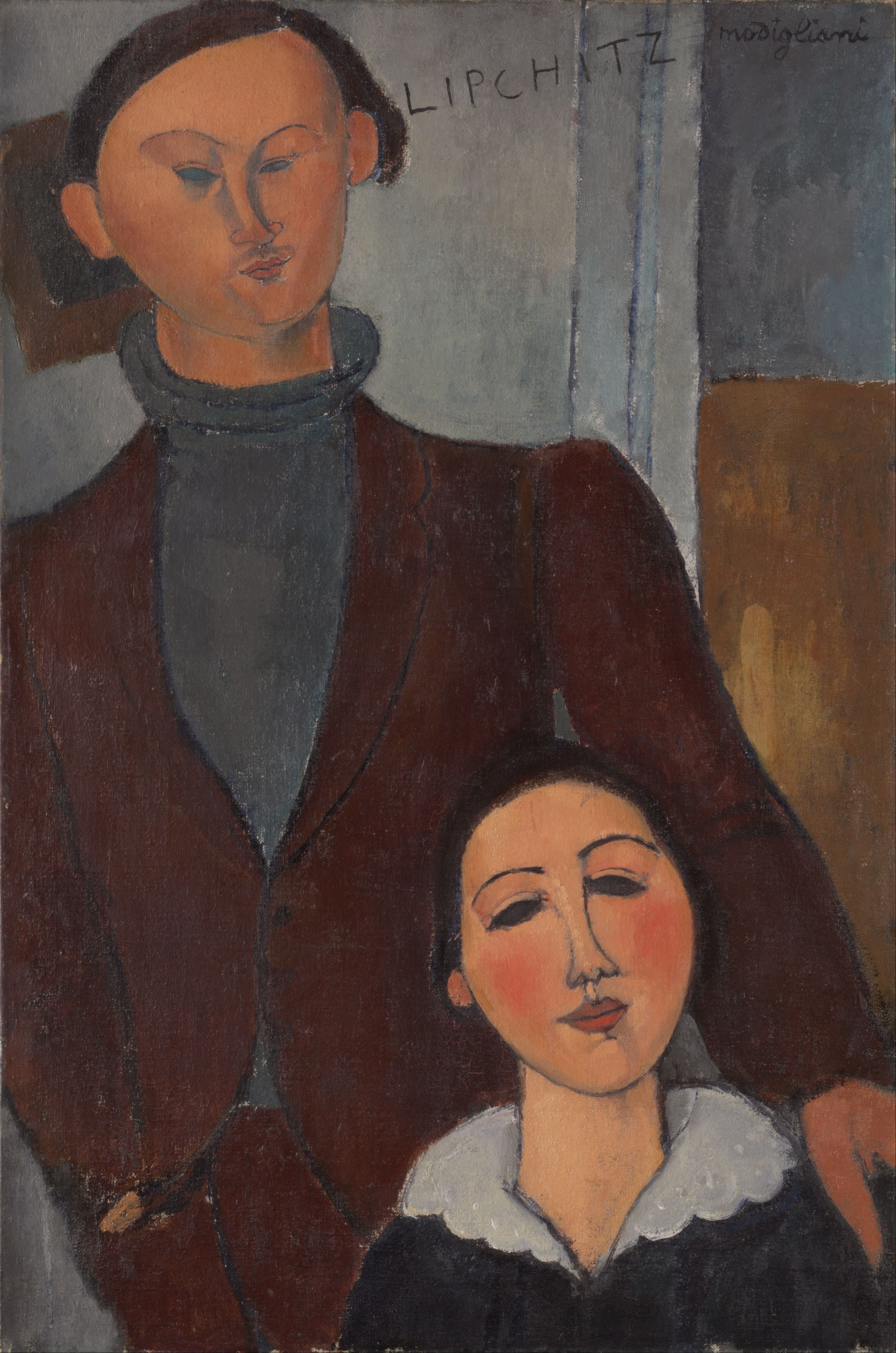
- Year: 1916
- Medium: oil paint, canvas
- Dimensions: 81.3 cm (32.0 in) × 54.3 cm (21.4 in)
- Location: Art Institute of Chicago

Jacques and Berthe Lipchitz is a 1916 oil on canvas painting by Amedeo Modigliani. It depicts Modigliani's friend, the sculptor Jacques Lipchitz, standing alongside his seated wife Berthe.

Modigliani and Lipchitz had each moved to France at a young age, were both from Jewish backgrounds, and became close friends who frequented the same artistic circles in Paris. Despite their commonalities, there were marked differences: Lipchitz exemplified artistic industriousness while Modigliani was given to bohemian dissolution.

Before painting Jacques and Berthe Lipchitz Modigliani made a series of preparatory drawings, of which five survive: two of Lipchitz, two of Berthe, and one of them together in the resolved composition. Lipchitz described the painting's development years later:

In 1916, having just signed a contract with Leonce Rosenberg, the dealer, I had a little money. I was also newly married, and my wife and I decided to ask Modigliani to make our portrait. "My price is ten francs a sitting and a little alcohol, you know," he replied when I asked him to do it. He came the next day and made a lot of preliminary drawings, one right after the other, with tremendous speed and precision. ... Finally a pose was decided upon— a pose inspired by our wedding photograph. The following day at one o'clock, Modigliani came with an old canvas and his box of painting materials, and we began to pose. I see him so clearly even now— sitting in front of his canvas which he had put on a chair, working quietly, interrupting only now and then to take a gulp of alcohol from the bottle standing nearby. ... By the end of the day he said "Well, I guess it's finished."

Lipchitz was uncomfortable accepting the painting for merely ten francs, and made excuses in order for Modigliani to continue working on the portrait. "You know", I said, "we sculptors like more substance." "Well," he answered, "if you want me to spoil it, I can continue." The portrait occupied Modigliani for nearly two weeks, "probably the longest time he ever worked on one painting."

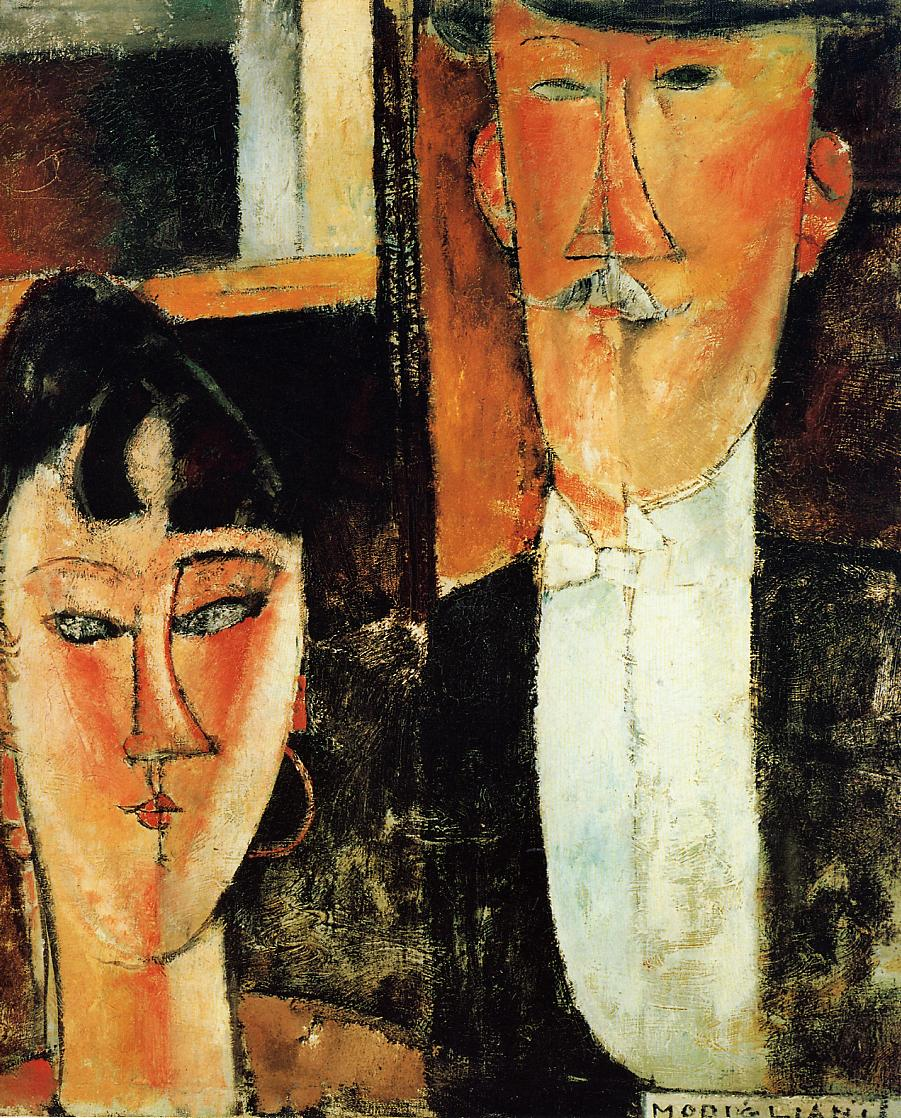
Amedeo Modigliani. Bride and Groom, 1915. The subjects of Modigliani's other double portrait appear to be "character puppets", whereas Jacques Lipchitz and his wife are "transformed into human beings".

One of only two double portraits painted by Modigliani, Jacques and Berthe Lipchitz has been noted for its complex and enigmatic study of contrasting personalities. Lipchitz is shown with his wife Berthe Kitrosser, a Russian poet, in their Paris apartment that had previously been the home of the sculptor Constantin Brâncuși. Posed in front of an abstracted architectural interior, Lipchitz is handsomely dressed, and stands casually with one hand on Berthe's shoulder. Their mask-like faces have encouraged varied readings; Berthe's gentle sensuality, her large eyes and lips and graceful neck, have been seen to offer a striking contrast to Lipchitz's self-pride, his small eyes and mouth and "wickedly twisted nose" combining to satirical effect. For art historian and curator Mason Klein, Berthe's face is bland and bourgeois, her frilly collar and pert nose suggesting haughtiness, while Lipchitz stands above her, domineering and protective.

Modigliani biographer Werner Schmalenbach compared Jacques and Berthe Lipchitz to the artist's Bride and Groom of 1915, and noted the development away from a purely formal depiction of 'types' to a greater interest in the characterization of individuals. This difference in the two works is consistent with an evolution in Modigliani's drawing and painting toward increased refinement.

After Modigliani died in 1920 Lipchitz crafted his death mask, making twelve plaster molds for Modigliani's friends and family. Soon thereafter Lipchitz traded the painting to his dealer in exchange for the return of sculptures "which I no longer felt were representative." The painting was purchased in 1922, and entered the Art Institute of Chicago in 1926 as part of the Helen Birch Bartlett Memorial Collection.
