= Jacques Lipchitz =

Lithuanian-born French cubist sculptor

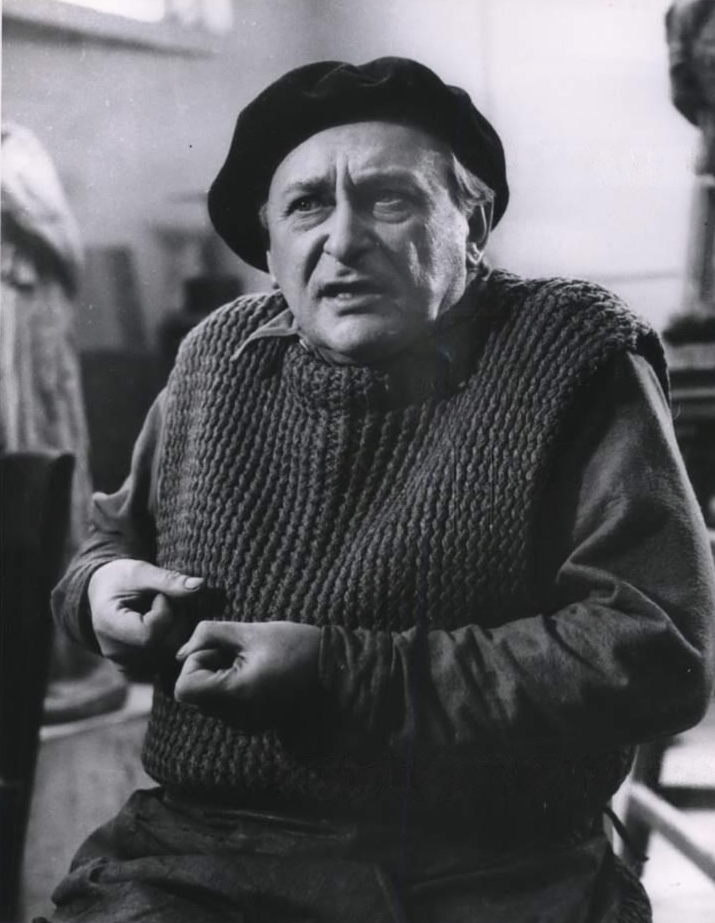
- Lipchitz in 1958
- Born: Chaim Jacob Lipschitz; 22 August 1891; Druskininkai, Lithuania
- Died: 26 May 1973 (aged 81); Capri, Italy
- Education: École des Beaux-Arts
- Known for: sculpting
- Movement: Cubism, School of Paris

Jacques Lipchitz (22 August [O.S. 10 August] 1891 – 26 May 1973) was a Lithuanian-born French-American Cubist sculptor. Lipchitz retained highly figurative and legible components in his work leading up to 1915–16, after which naturalist and descriptive elements were muted, dominated by a synthetic style of Crystal Cubism. In 1920 Lipchitz held his first solo exhibition, at Léonce Rosenberg's Galerie L'Effort Moderne in Paris where he was counted as part of the School of Paris. Fleeing the Nazis he moved to the US and settled in New York City and eventually Hastings-on-Hudson. While in the US, he created a number of his best-known works, including the outdoor sculptures The Song of the Vowels, Birth of the Muses, and Bellerophon Taming Pegasus, the last of which was completed after his death.

== Life and career ==
Jacques Lipchitz was born Chaim Jacob Lipschitz, in a Litvak family, son of a building contractor in Druskininkai, Lithuania, then within the Russian Empire. He studied at Vilnius grammar school and Vilnius Art School. Under the influence of his father he studied engineering in 1906–1909, but soon after, supported by his mother he moved to Paris (1909) to study at the École des Beaux-Arts and the Académie Julian.

It was there, in the artistic communities of Montmartre and Montparnasse, that he joined a group of artists that included Juan Gris and Pablo Picasso as well as where his friend, Amedeo Modigliani, painted Jacques and Berthe Lipchitz.

Living in this environment, Lipchitz soon began to create Cubist sculpture. In 1912 he exhibited at the Salon de la Société Nationale des Beaux-Arts and the Salon d'Automne with his first solo show held at Léonce Rosenberg's Galerie L'Effort Moderne in Paris in 1920. In 1922 he was commissioned by the Barnes Foundation in Merion, Pennsylvania to execute seven bas-reliefs and two sculptures.

With artistic innovation at its height, in the 1920s he experimented with abstract forms he called transparent sculptures. Later he developed a more dynamic style, which he applied with telling effect to bronze compositions of figures and animals.

In 1924–25 Lipchitz became a French citizen through naturalization and married Berthe Kitrosser. With the German occupation of France during World War II, and the deportation of Jews to the Nazi death camps, Lipchitz had to flee France. With the assistance of the American journalist Varian Fry in Marseille, he escaped the Nazi regime and went to the United States. There, he eventually settled in Hastings-on-Hudson, New York.

Jacques Lipchitz, 1917, L'homme à la mandoline, 80 cm

He was one of 250 sculptors who exhibited in the Third Sculpture International Exhibition held at the Philadelphia Museum of Art in the summer of 1949. He has been identified among seventy of those sculptors in a photograph Life magazine published that was taken at the exhibition. In 1954 a Lipchitz retrospective traveled from The Museum of Modern Art in New York to the Walker Art Center in Minneapolis and The Cleveland Museum of Art. In 1959, his series of small bronzes To the Limit of the Possible was shown at Fine Arts Associates in New York.

In his later years Lipchitz became more involved in his Jewish faith, even referring to himself as a "religious Jew" in an interview in 1970. He began abstaining from work on Shabbat and put on Tefillin daily, at the urging of the Lubavitcher Rebbe, Rabbi Menachem Schneerson.

Beginning in 1963 he returned to Europe for several months of each year and worked in Pietrasanta, Italy. He developed a close friendship with fellow sculptor, Fiore de Henriquez. In 1972 his autobiography, co-authored with H. Harvard Arnason, was published on the occasion of an exhibition of his sculpture at the Metropolitan Museum of Art in New York.

== Death and legacy ==
Jacques Lipchitz died in Capri, Italy. A contingent including Rabbi Gershon Mendel Garelik flew with his body to Jerusalem for the burial.

His Tuscan Villa Bozio was donated to Chabad-Lubavitch in Italy and currently hosts an annual Jewish summer camp in its premises.

== Selected works ==
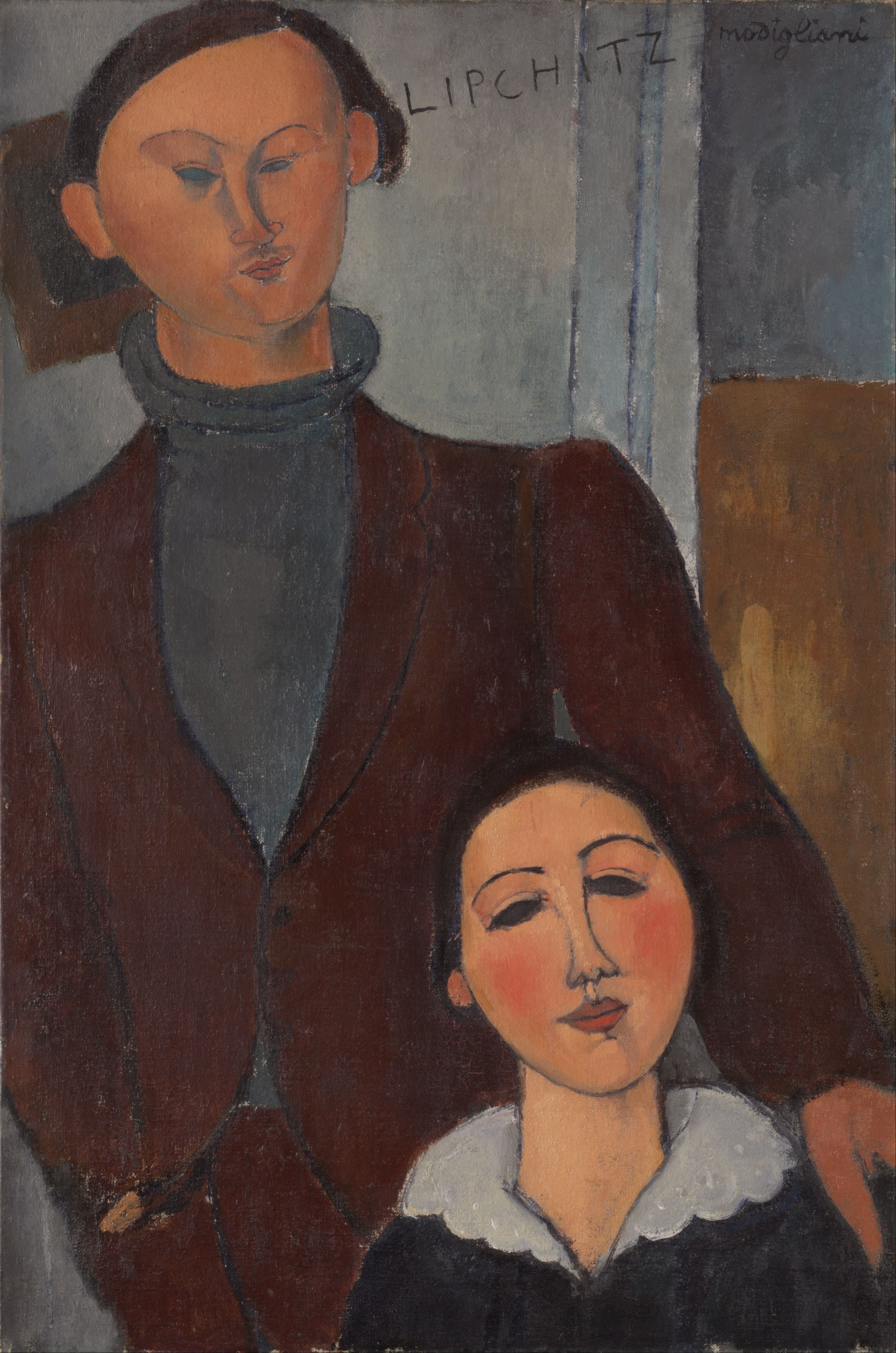
Amedeo Modigliani, 1916, Jacques and Berthe Lipchitz

- Drawing of a sculpture – 1916
- Bather – 1916–17
- Sailor with Guitar – 1917
- Woman with Book – 1918, at Carleton College
- Bather, bronze – 1923–1925
- Reclining Nude with Guitar – 1928, a prime example of Cubism
- Dancer with Veil – 1928
- Dancer – 1929
- The Song of the Vowels – (Le Chant des Voyelles), – 1931 cast bronze sculptures at Cornell University; Princeton University; UCLA; Stanford University; Kykuit Estate Gardens (New York), Paris, and the Kröller-Müller Museum (Netherlands)
- Bull and Condor – 1932
- Bust of a Woman – 1932
- David and Goliath – 1933
- Embracing Figures – 1941
- Prometheus Strangling the Vulture – 1944
- Birth of the Muses 1944–1950, Massachusetts Institute of Technology (MIT) campus, Cambridge, Massachusetts
- Rescue II- 1947
- Mother and Child – 1949 at the Honolulu Museum of Art
- Descent of the Spirit - 1959
- John F. Kennedy Memorial, London - 1965. This was originally on Marylebone Road but from 2019 has been in the lobby of the International Students House, London at 229 Great Portland Street
- Daniel Greysolon, Sieur du Lhut - 1965 at the University of Minnesota Duluth
- Bellerophon Taming Pegasus: Large Version – 1966–1977, begun in 1966 and arrived at Columbia Law School in pieces for assembly in 1977
- Peace on Earth – 1967–1969
- Government of the People – 1976

== Gallery ==
Jacques Lipchitz, 1914, Acrobat on Horseback (Acrobate à cheval)

Jacques Lipchitz, 1918, Instruments de musique (Still Life), bas relief, stone

Jacques Lipchitz, 1918, Le Guitariste (The Guitar Player)

Jacques Lipchitz, 1919, Pierrot

Jacques Lipchitz, 1919–20, Harlequin with Clarinet

Jacques Lipchitz, 1920, Harlequin with Clarinet

Jacques Lipchitz, 1920, Man with Guitar

Jacques Lipchitz, 1920, Portrait of Jean Cocteau

Mother and Child, 1930, Honolulu Museum of Art

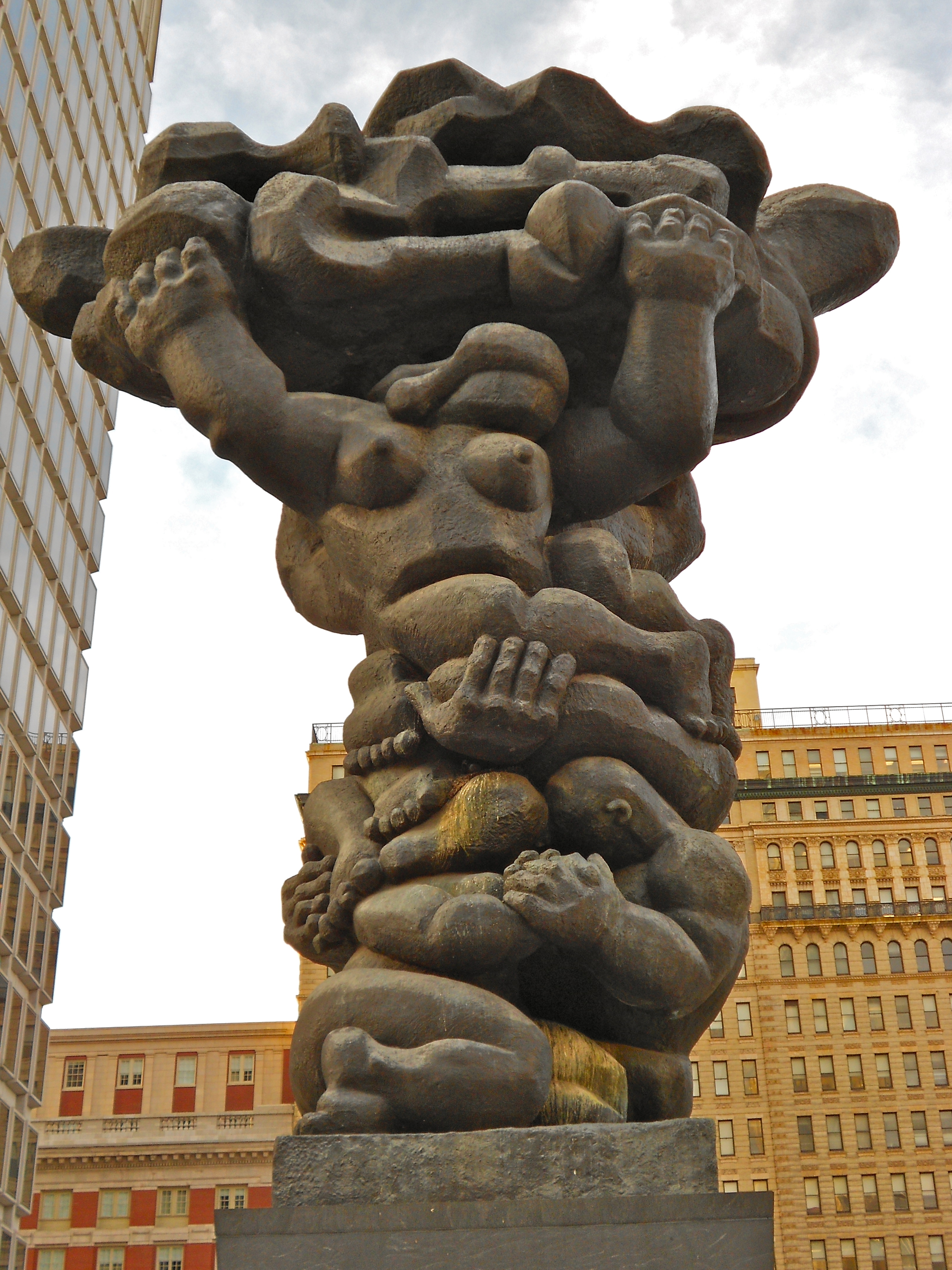
Government of the People, bronze sculpture by Jacques Lipchitz, dedicated 1976, Philadelphia

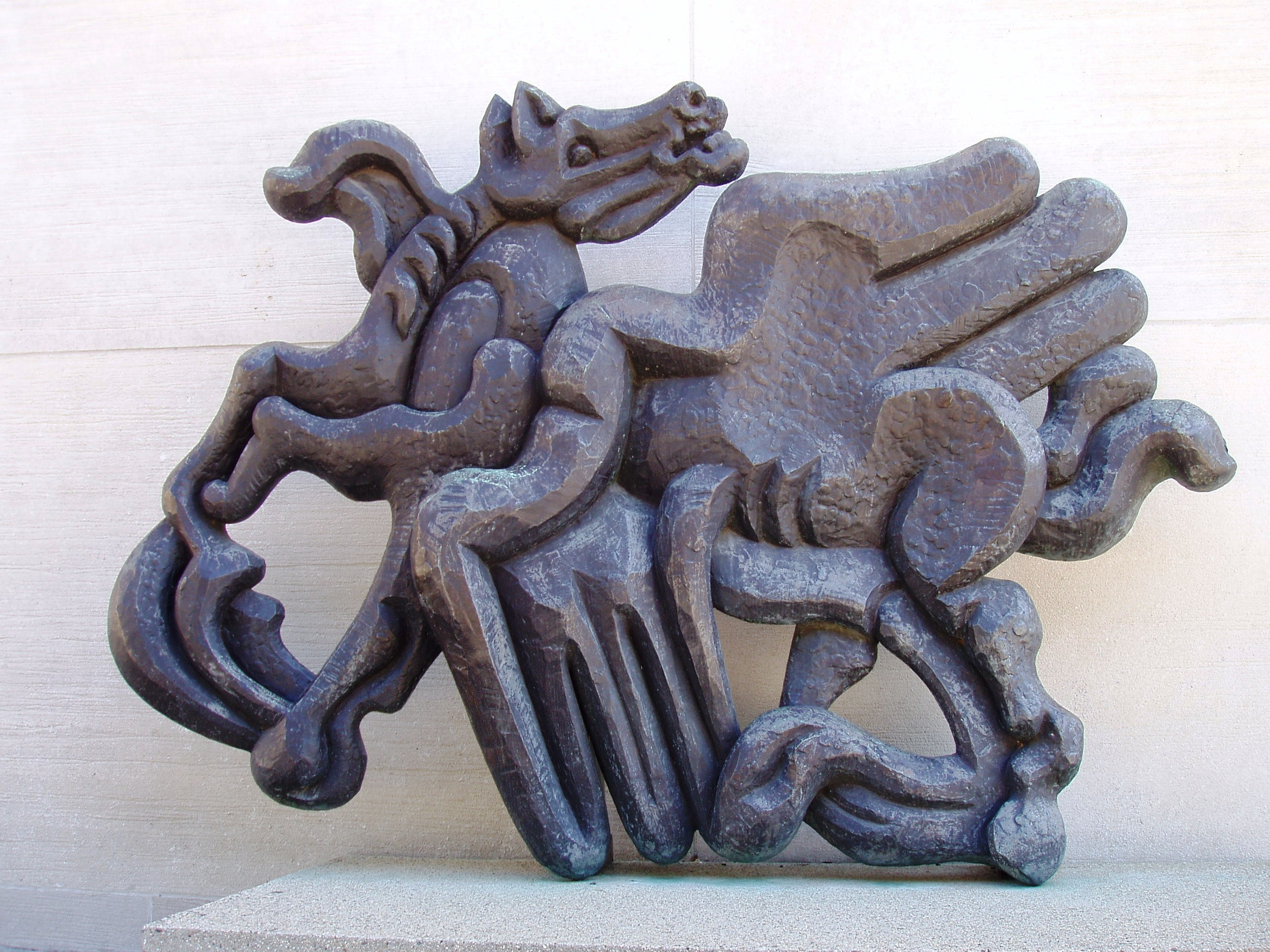
Birth of the Muses, bronze, 1944–1950, In memory of Jerome Wiesner - in the permanent collection of the Massachusetts Institute of Technology

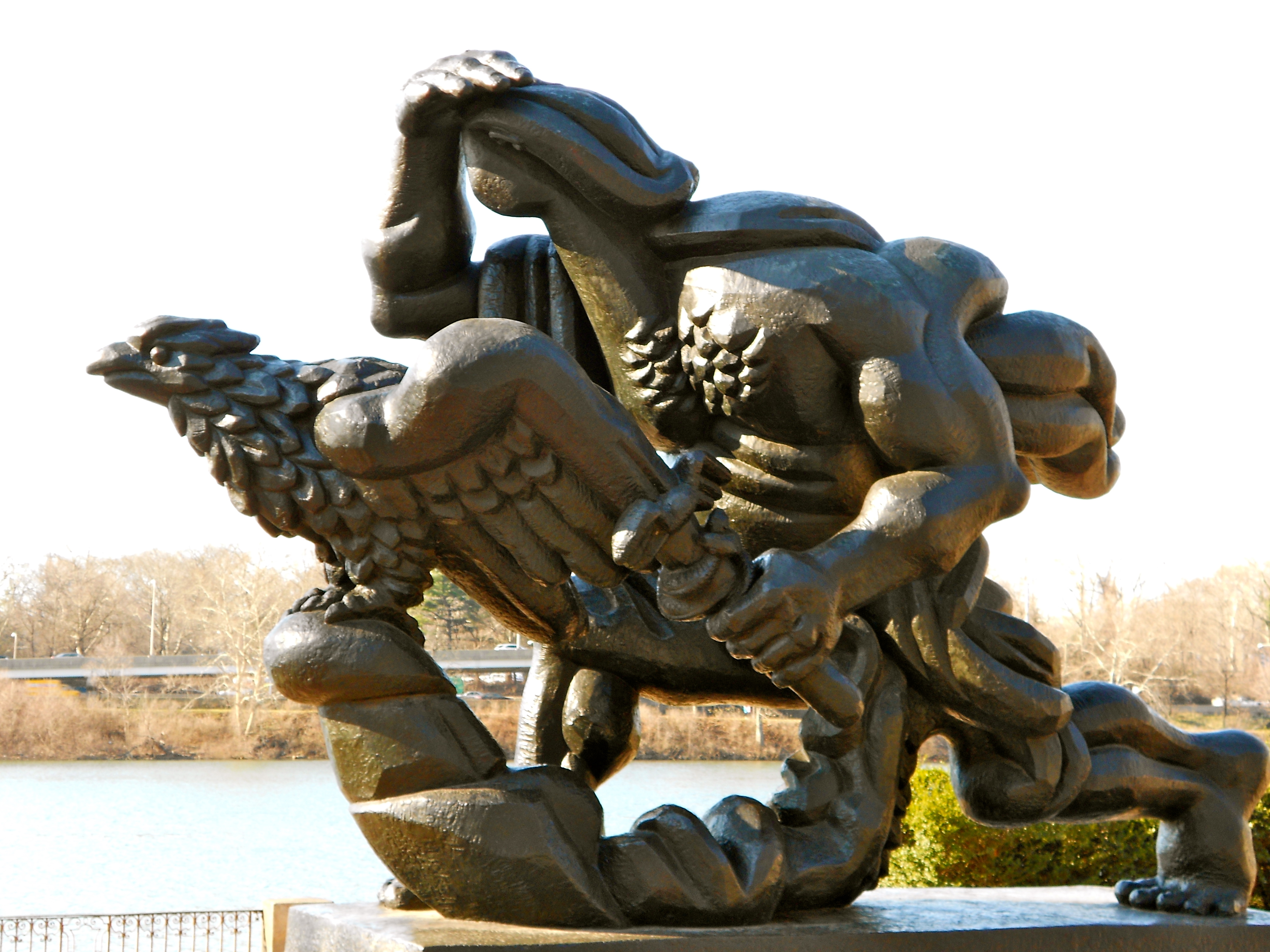
The Spirit of Enterprise, 1960, in Fairmount Park, Philadelphia

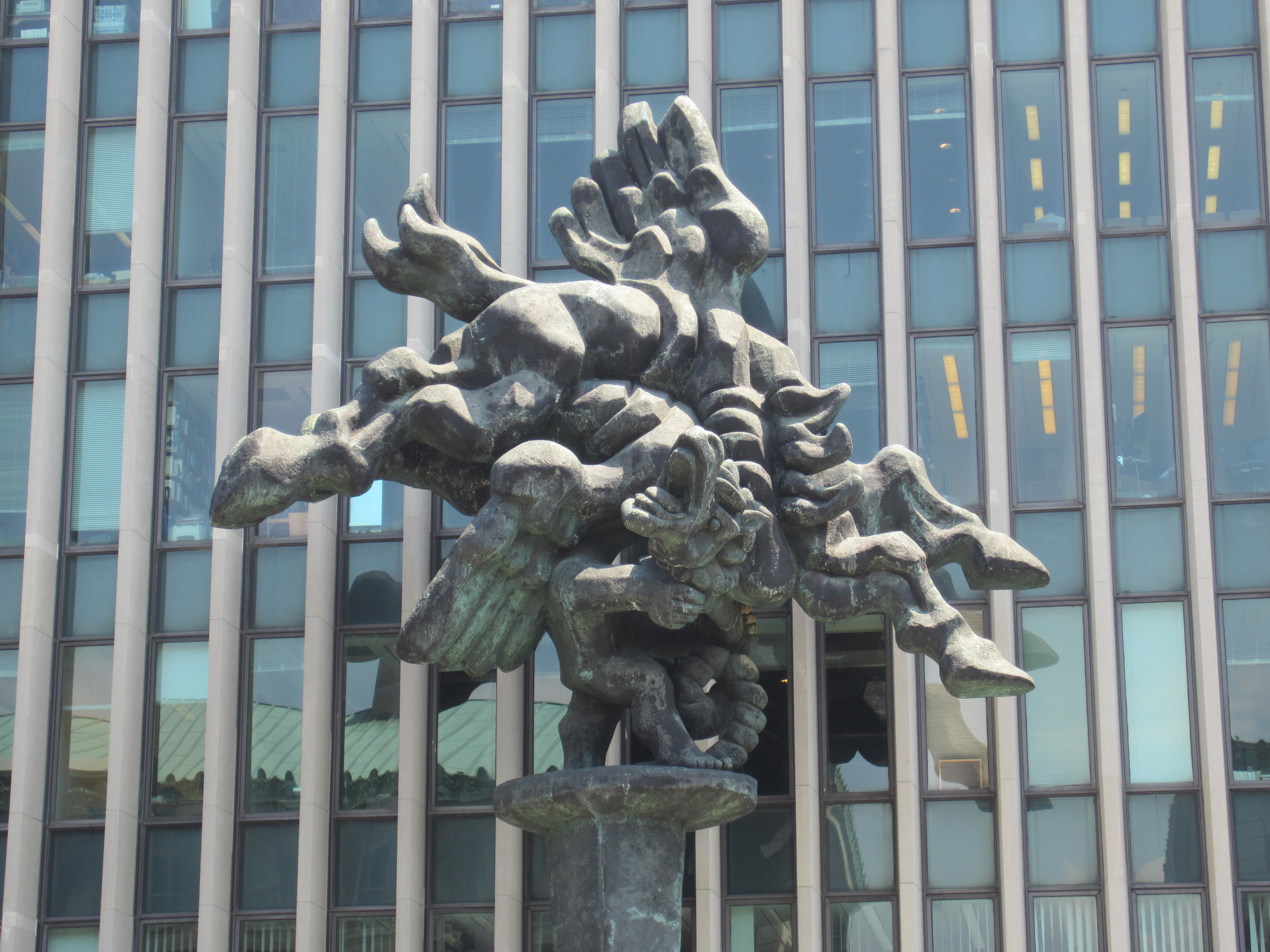
Bellerophon Taming Pegasus, bronze, 1966–1977, in Columbia University, New York City; completed posthumously

== See also ==
- Crystal Cubism
