= St Martin Gardens =

Gardens in Monaco–Ville, Monaco

Coordinates: 43°43′47.32″N 7°25′26.3″E

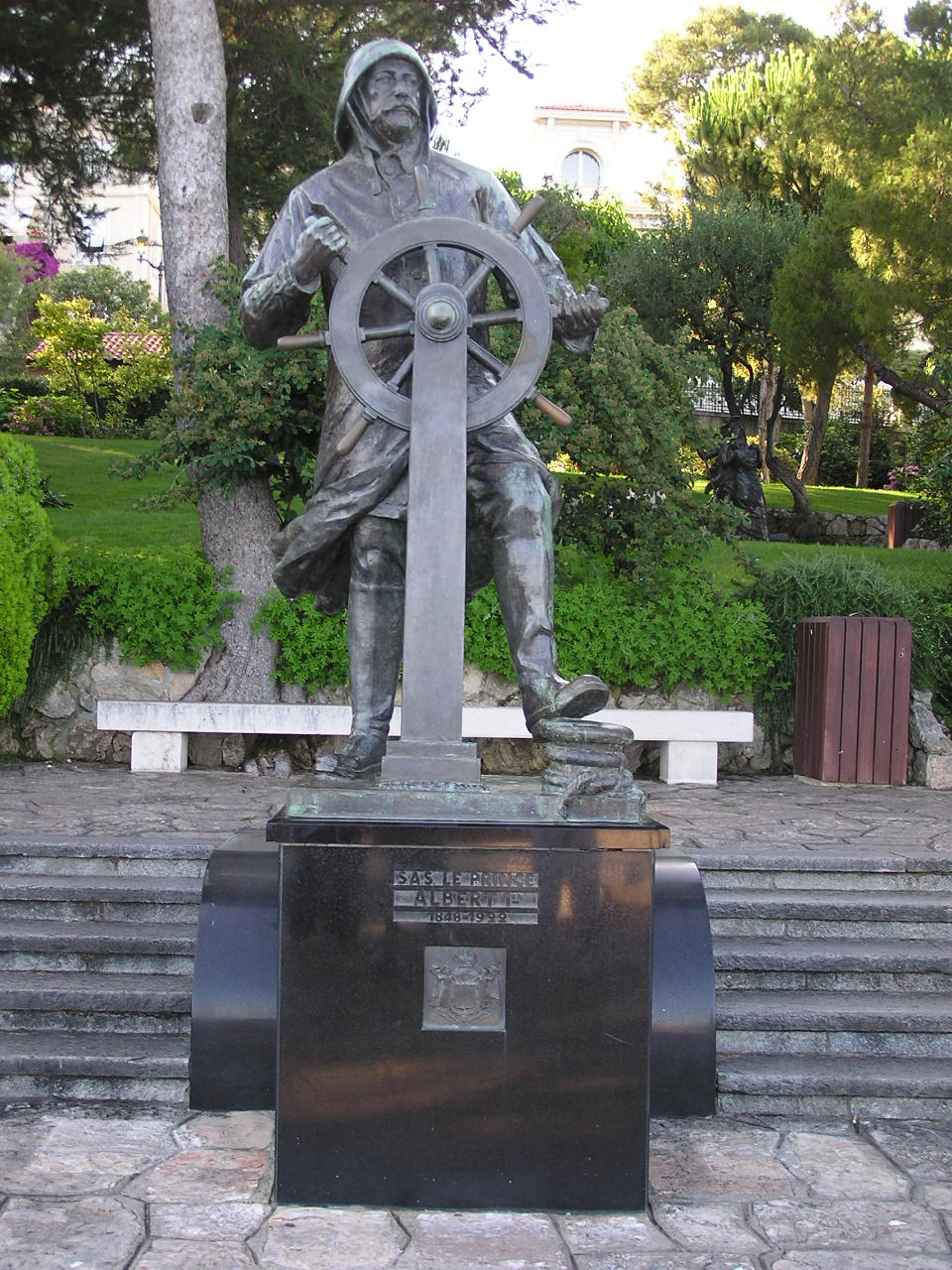
Statue of Prince Albert I

The Jardin St. Martin (Monégasque: Giardi̍n San Martin) are located in the Monaco-Ville ward of Monaco. The gardens are made up of a series of paths on the south west face of the Rock of Monaco. They have an estimated area of 11,200 square meters (1.12 hectares). Flora include Aleppo pine trees and yellow agaves in its terraces with medieval fortifications also featuring in the gardens. Archaeological finds in the gardens have been dated to the Holocene era.

François Cogné's bronze statue of Prince Albert I as a sailor stands at the centre of the gardens.

== See also ==
- List of public art in Monaco
