= Peace on Earth (Lipchitz) =

Sculpture in Los Angeles, California, U.S.

- The sculpture in 2022
- Artist: Jacques Lipchitz
- Year: 1966
- Location: Los Angeles, California, U.S.
- 34°3′26.7″N 118°14′54.8″W

Peace on Earth is a sculpture by Jacques Lipchitz, from 1966. It was installed in Los Angeles, California, in 1969.

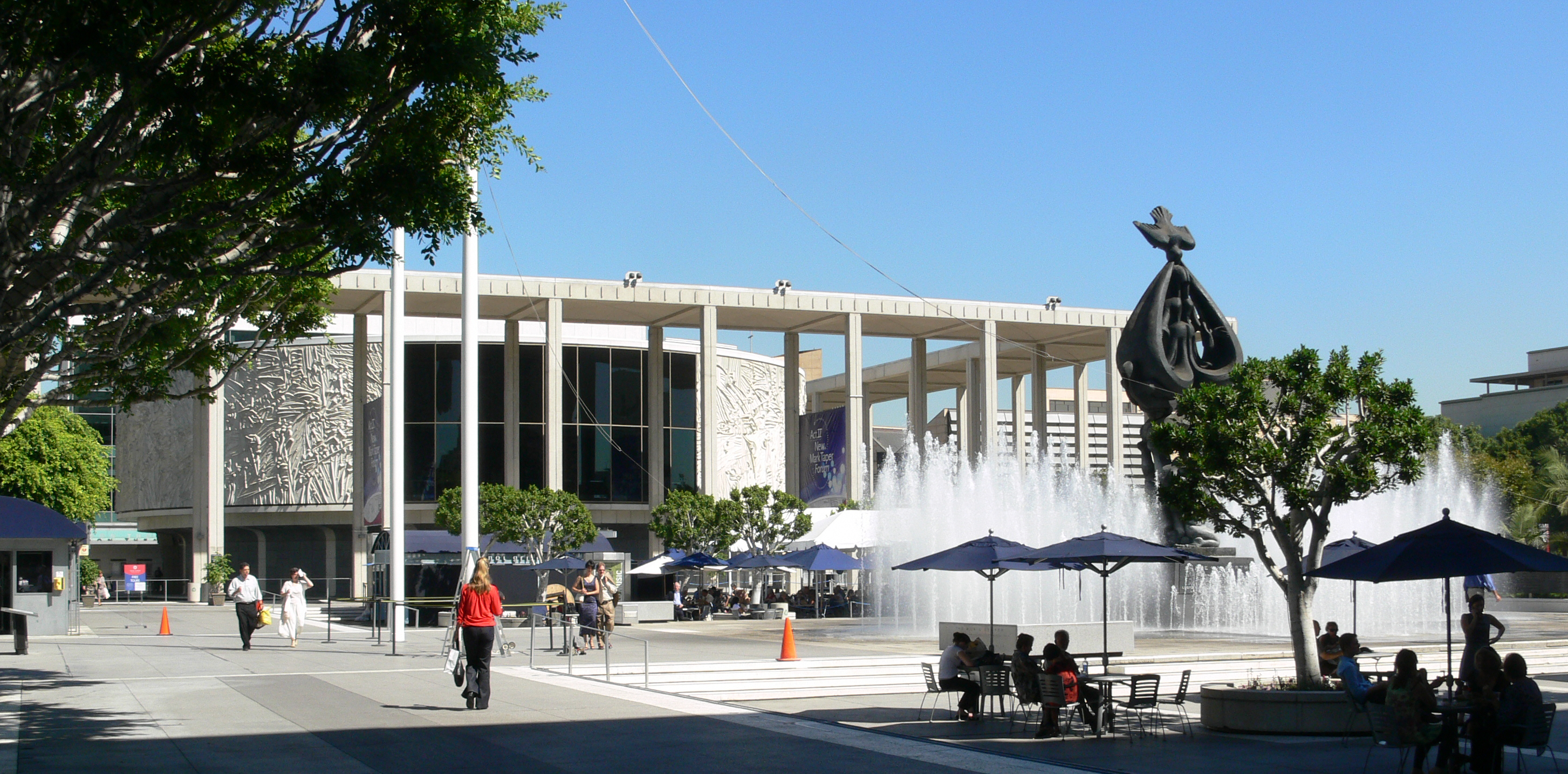
2008

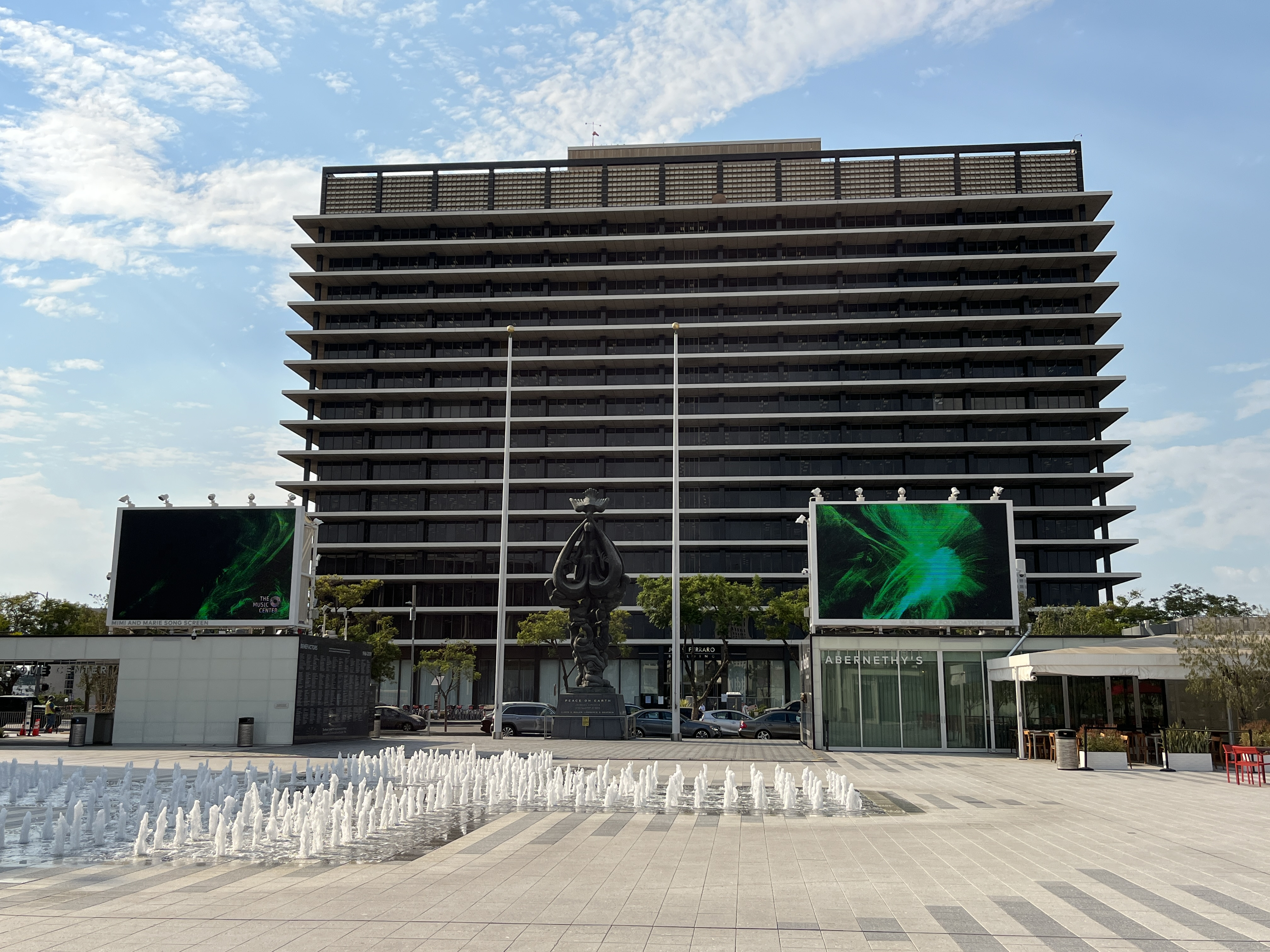
2022
