= Fontvieille Park and Princess Grace Rose Garden =

Park in Fontvieille, Monaco

- Interactive map of Fontvieille Park and Princess Grace Rose Garden
- Location: Fontvieille, Monaco
- Coordinates: 43°43′37.98″N 7°25′9.43″E
- Status: Open year round

The Fontvieille Park and the Princess Grace Rose Garden are two municipal parks in the Fontvieille district of Monaco. The parks are a combined 4 hectares (9.9 acres) in size, and are open daily from dawn to dusk.

== Fontvieille Park ==
The park features a sculpture trail, notable pieces include Cavalleria Eroica by Arman, and a clenched fist by César. It was enlarged by 1.5 hectares for the 30th anniversary of its foundation.

== Princess Grace Rose Garden ==
The rose garden was created in 1984 as a memorial to Grace Kelly, wife of Prince Rainier III. Princess Grace is commemorated in a statue by Kees Verkade in the rose garden, which features 4,000 roses.

It was re-dedicated in 2014. A year later, in June 2015, an organization called Les amis de la Roseraie Princesse Grace de Monaco was established. Its president is Yves Piaget, an heir to the Swiss watchmaker Piaget SA. The organization is set to publish a book about the history of the rose garden as well as offer lessons on how to prune rosebushes. It will also organize the International Competition of Roses.
