= Kees Verkade =

Dutch artist (1941–2020)

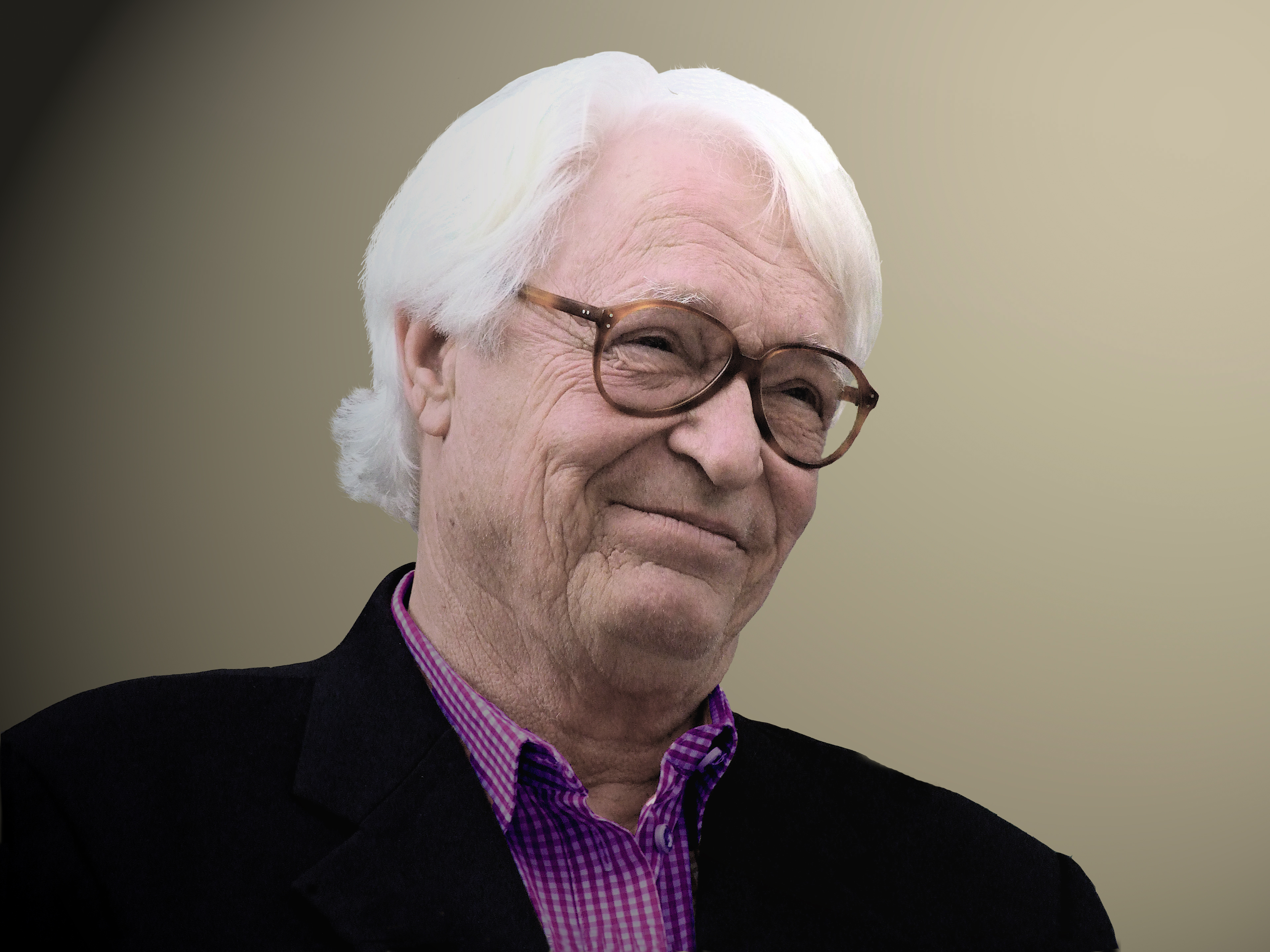
- Verkade in 2009
- Born: Korstiaan Verkade; 12 October 1941; Haarlem, Netherlands
- Died: 29 December 2020 (aged 79); Monaco
- Occupation: Sculptor
- Spouse: Baroness Ludmila von Falz-Fein

Korstiaan "Kees" Verkade (12 October 1941 – 29 December 2020) was a Dutch artist and sculptor. He specialized in modeling the human form, with an emphasis on movement and emotion. Most of his sculptures are set in bronze. They depict a variety of people, including children, clowns, athletes, dancers, mothers, and lovers. Verkade also created gouaches and silkscreens to accompany his sculptures.

== Biography ==
=== Early life ===
Kees Verkade was born on 12 October 1941 in Haarlem. He wished to attend the Gerrit Rietveld Academie but was rejected. He took painting lessons with Gerrit van ’t Net from 1958 to 1963, and from Dirk Bus at the Royal Academy of Art, The Hague. He graduated from the academy in 1963.

=== Career ===
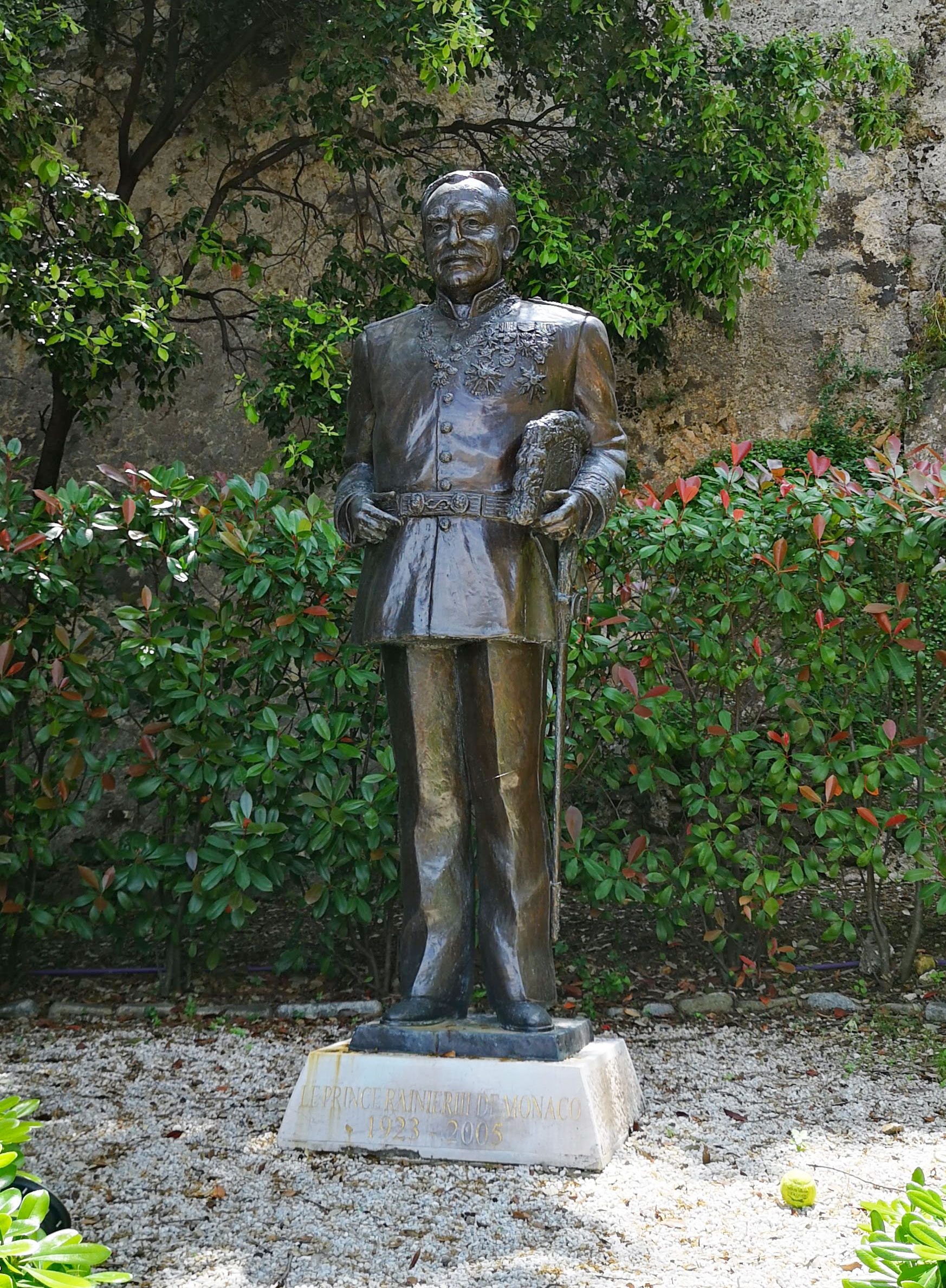
Life-size bronze statue of Prince Rainier III

In 1964, he had his first exposition in the Haarlem Vleeshal (the former municipal meat market), now belonging to the Frans Hals Museum. This was a success and the Frans Hals Museum bought two of his sculptures. He specialised in carving and sculpture. In 1966 he sold his first public work Winkelen to the municipality of Haarlem in 1966. His big breakthrough came three years later when American photographer David Douglas Duncan bought several of his bronze statues and showed them to his friends. Verkade then proceeded to become an internationally recognized artist, and many local associations bought his work. His work can be seen in public places around Haarlem and Zandvoort, where he lived and worked.

In 2013, he did a public sculpture of the late Rainier III, Prince of Monaco (1923–2005), which stands outside the Prince's Palace of Monaco.

=== Personal life ===
He moved to Monaco in the late 1970s. In 1979 he married Baroness Ludmila von Falz-Fein, the daughter of the Liechtensteiner sportsman Eduard von Falz-Fein. He died there on 29 December 2020, aged 79.

== Selected works ==
- H.S.H. Princess Grace of Monaco (1983) in the Princess Grace Rose Garden, in Fontvieille, Monaco
- Triomf (1995) in Rotterdam, Netherlands
- Malizia (1997) a statue of François Grimaldi in Monaco
- Tightrope Walker (1979), Columbia University, New York City
Selected works

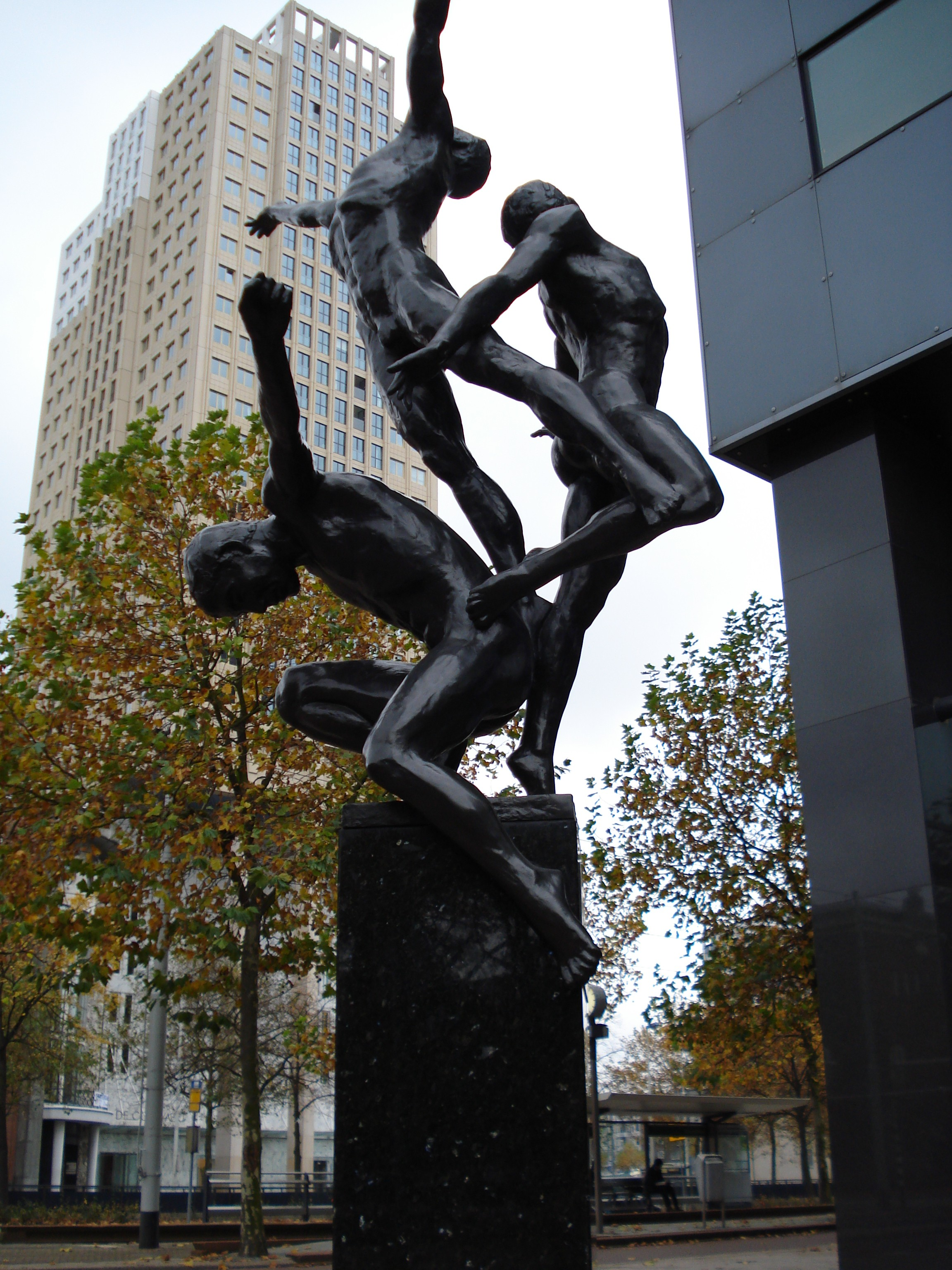
Triomf (1995), Rotterdam

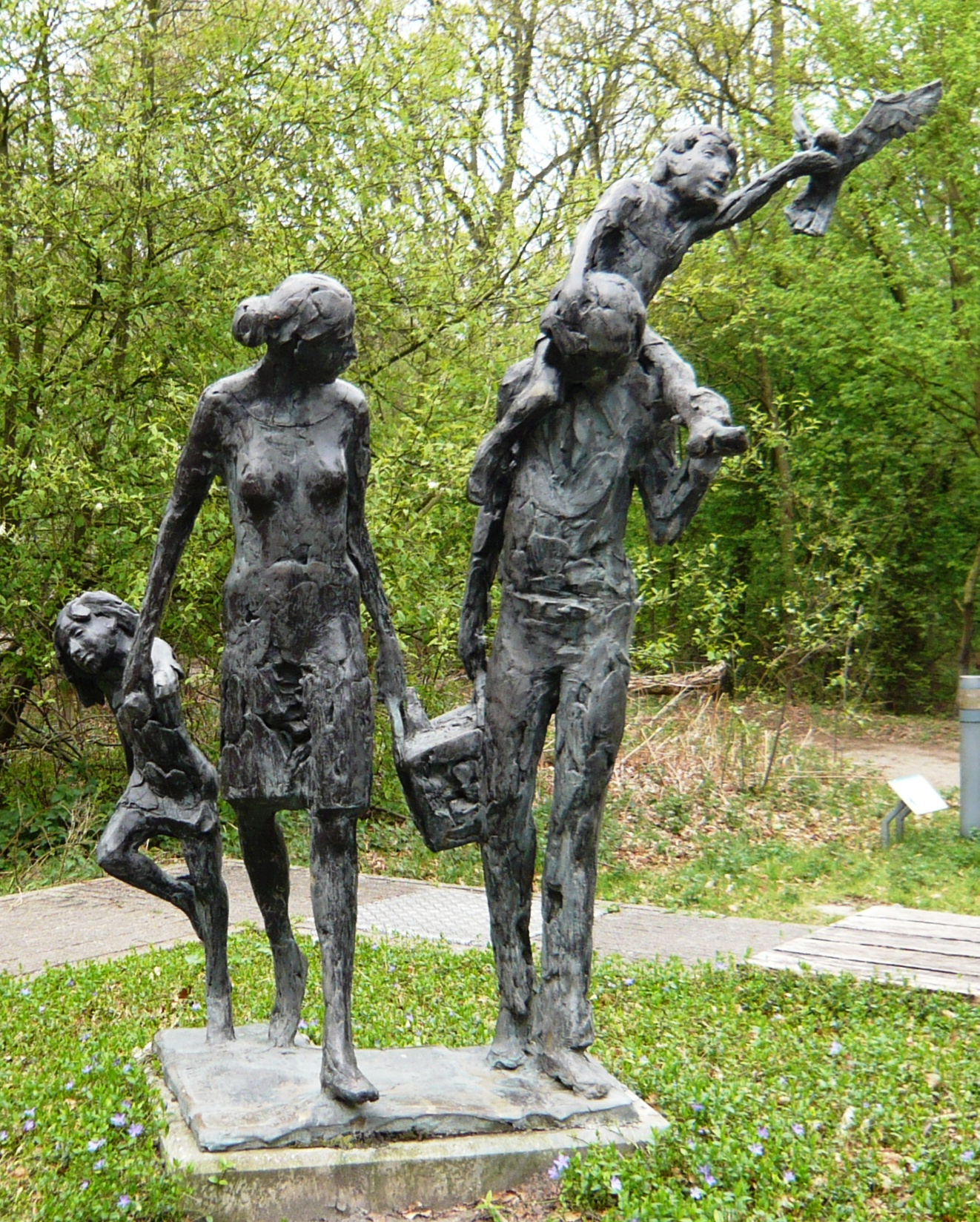
1978 Bronze statue of family with picnic basket. Situated at the entrance to the Amsterdamse Waterleidingduinen park in Vogelenzang, Netherlands
