= Birth of the Muses =

Sculpture in Cambridge, Massachusetts, U.S.

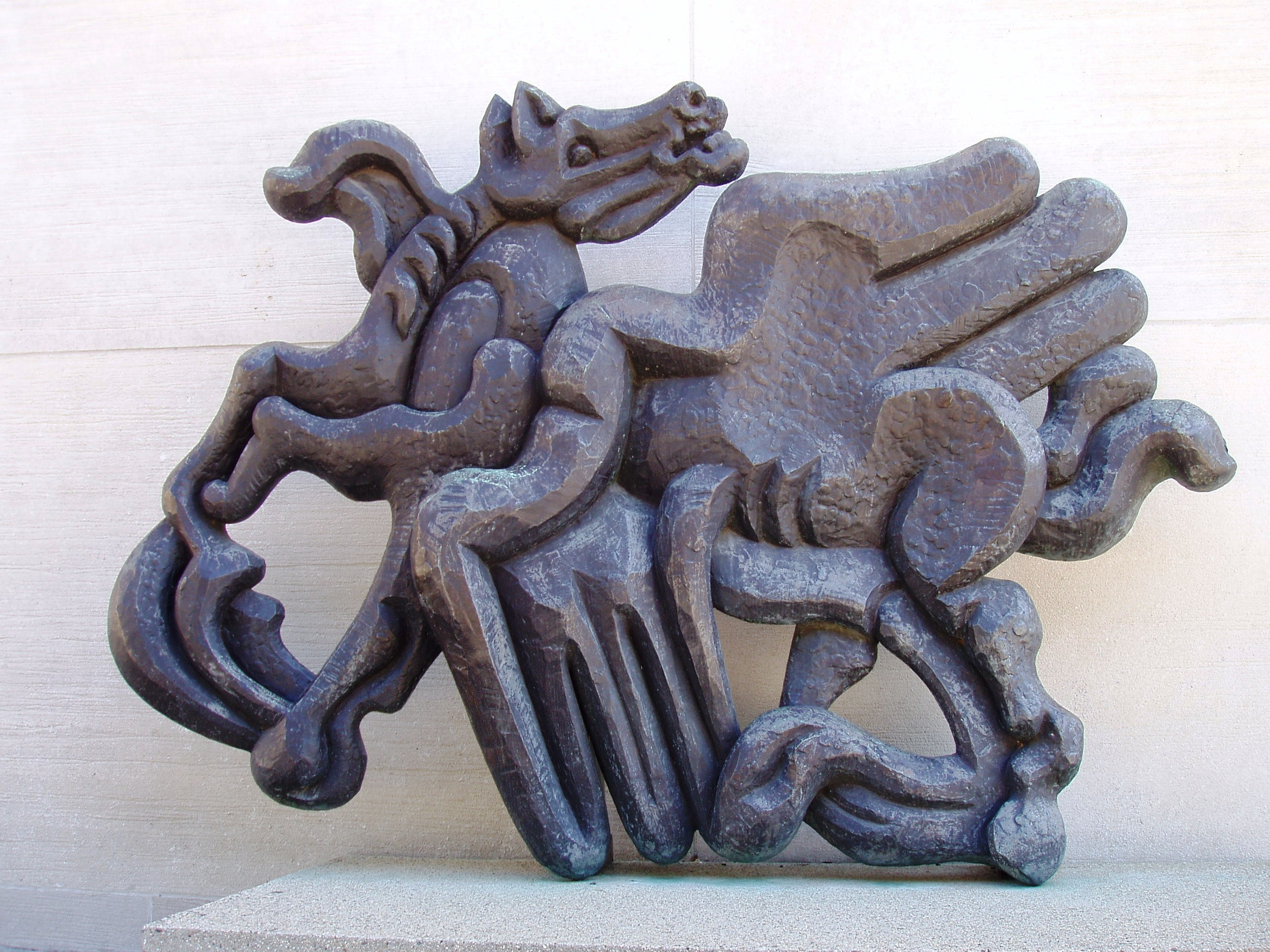
- The sculpture in 2005
- Artist: Jacques Lipchitz
- Year: 1944–1950
- Medium: Bronze sculpture
- Location: Cambridge, Massachusetts, U.S.

Birth of the Muses is a 1944–1950 bronze sculpture by Jacques Lipchitz, installed on the Massachusetts Institute of Technology (MIT) campus, in Cambridge, Massachusetts, United States.

The piece Birth of the Muses "grew out of a series of small sketches from 1944 treating the theme of Greek mythological Pegasus. According to myth, this winged horse alighted on Mt. Olympus, where its four hooves touched the ground, four springs of water emerged in which the muses were born".

== Syracuse University ==
Another copy of the sculpture hangs at the Newhouse 1 building of the S.I. Newhouse School of Public Communications on Syracuse University campus. It was donated in 1964 by Samuel Irving Newhouse Sr.

== See also ==
- Muses in popular culture
