= Tightrope Walker (sculpture) =

Sculpture in Manhattan, New York, U.S.

- The sculpture in 2014
- Artist: Kees Verkade
- Year: 1979
- Type: Sculpture
- Medium: Bronze
- Location: New York City, New York, United States; 40.807533°N 73.960666°W

Tightrope Walker (sometimes Tight Rope Walker) is an outdoor bronze sculpture by Dutch artist Kees Verkade, installed on Columbia University's Revson Plaza in Upper Manhattan, New York City, in 1979. The work commemorates General William J. Donovan and depicts one figure standing atop another as he tightrope walks.

== See also ==
- 1979 in art
