= Gertrude Schweitzer =

American artist

Gertrude Schweitzer (1911–1989) was an American artist. Schweitzer was born in New York City and studied at the Pratt Institute. Her work is included in the collections of the Whitney Museum of American Art, the Brooklyn Museum, the Metropolitan Museum of Art and the Art Institute of Chicago.
