= Life Force (sculpture) =

Sculpture in Manhattan, New York, U.S.

- The sculpture in 2014
- Artist: David Bakatar
- Type: Sculpture
- Medium: Bronze
- Location: New York City, New York, United States; 40.807221°N 73.960768°W

Life Force is an outdoor abstract, bronze sculpture by David Bakalar, installed on the Columbia University campus in New York City, in 1992.
