= Fontvieille, Monaco =

Fontvieille Funtanaveya (Monégasque)
- Ward of Monaco

- Location in Monaco
- Coordinates: 43°43′46″N 7°24′54″E
- Country: Monaco

Area
  - Total: 32.9516 ha (81.425 acres)

Population (2008)
  - Total: 3,602
  - Density: 10,931/km^{2} (28,310/sq mi)

Fontvieille (French pronunciation: [fɔ̃vjɛj]; Monégasque: Funtanaveya [fuŋtanaˈvɛja]) is the southernmost district of the Principality of Monaco. The district was designed by architect Manfredi Nicoletti and developed under the direction of Italian engineer Gianfranco Gilardini between the 1970s and 1990s.

== History ==
Fontvieille was constructed almost entirely on artificially reclaimed land, making it one of the youngest districts in the Principality of Monaco. Unlike other districts—Monaco-Ville, Monte Carlo, and La Condamine—Fontvieille was created through a large-scale land reclamation project on the southwest side of the Rock (Le Rocher) to address the principality's limited available land. Work began in 1966. In 1981, then-Crown Prince Albert laid the cornerstone for the new district.

The existence of Fontvieille, and its many public works projects, relates substantially to former Prince of Monaco, Prince Rainier III's reputation as the Builder Prince.

Plans announced in late 2009 to extend Fontvieille by the Department of Urban Development are currently being overseen by Prince Albert. The plan is to build a small 5.3-hectare (13-acre) aura on the west side of the rock, currently planned to be finished by 2015.

The new area will include three to four new hotels, corporate businesses, shops and apartments for between 600 and 800 newcomers.

Despite not being the highest-priced part of Monaco, flats are also very expensive. For example, a 65 m^{2} (700 ft²) one bedroom apartment with one bathroom and one car parking space was offered at €3,200,000 in May 2015.

== Geography ==
Fontvieille is located in the southwestern part of Monaco and covers an area of 33 33 hectares (82 acres). As of 2023, the district's population is approximately 4,420 people, representing about 12% of the principality's total population. To the west, it borders the French commune of Cap-d'Ail, making it the westernmost district of Monaco.

About four hectares of the district are occupied by Fontvieille Park and the Princess Grace Rose Garden.

== Sport ==
Fontvieille contains Stade Louis II (or Louis II Stadium), which serves as the home ground of AS Monaco FC, a Monaco football club that is one of the most successful in the French national league.

It also contains a small indoor sports arena called Salle Gaston Médecin where AS Monaco Basket plays as a member of LNB Pro A, and which hosts other events like handball, volleyball, gymnastics, and more.

Monaco's only racing team, ROKiT Venturi Racing – which competed in the FIA Formula E World Championship – is also based in Fontvieille. Since 2022-23, Maserati MSG Racing has been in control of ROKiT Venturi; however, the team has stayed in Fontvieille and has remained under a Monégasque license.

== Landmarks ==
The district also contains the Monaco Heliport, which provides frequent links to Nice Airport in neighboring France, with connections to direct flights to New York, Dubai, London, and other important European destinations.

Monaco's automobile museum, the Monaco Top Cars Collection, is located on the Terrasses de Fontvieille.

The Museum of Stamps and Coins displays Monegasque money dating to 1640, and illustrates the postal history of the principality.

Columbus Hotel Monaco, which was owned by former racing driver David Coulthard, is located in Fontvieille.

Venturi and its subsidiary Voxan are headquartered on the northern side of Fontvieille.

The zoological garden and the Princess Grace Rose Garden are also found there.

== Gallery ==
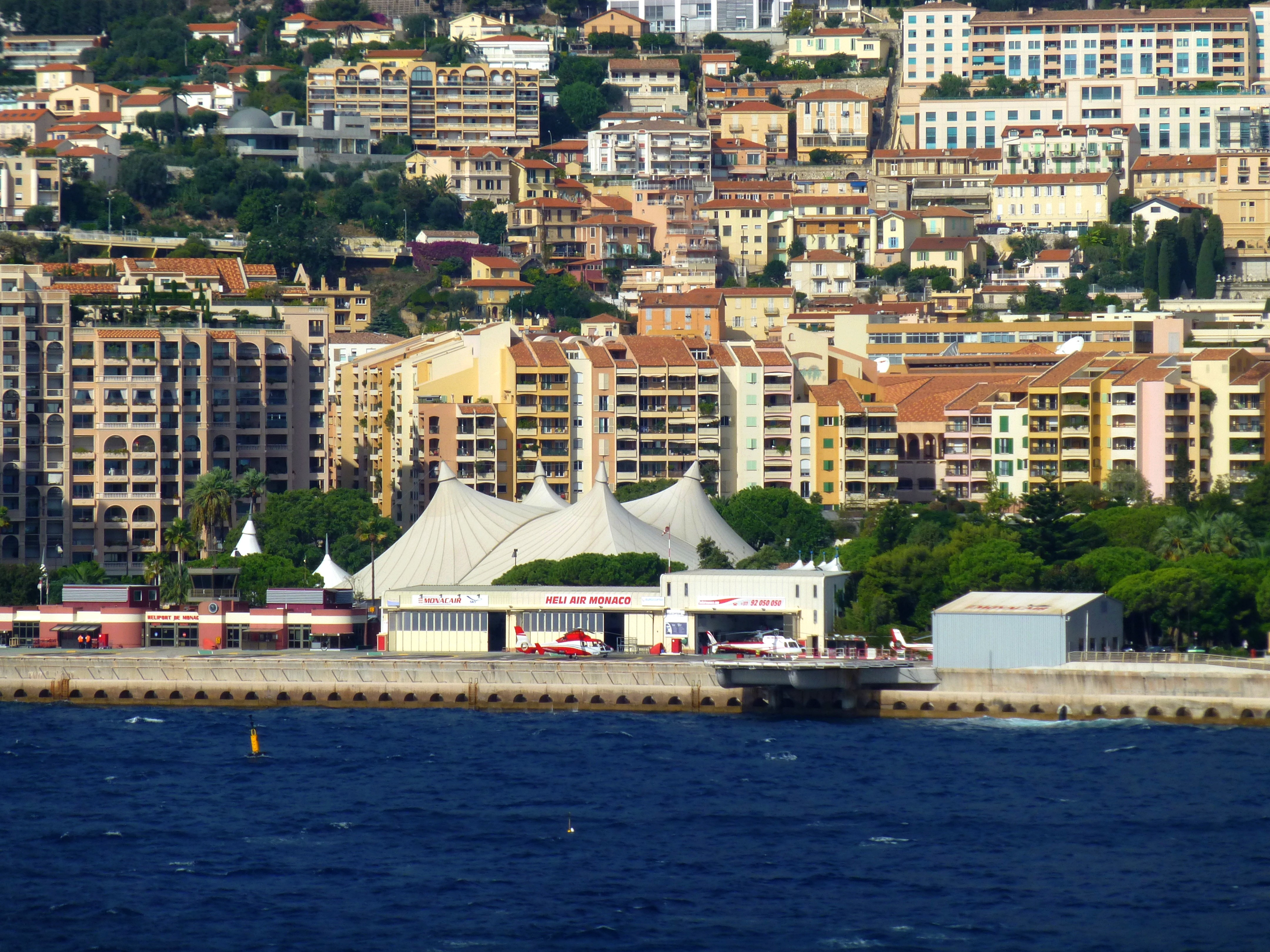
The heliport

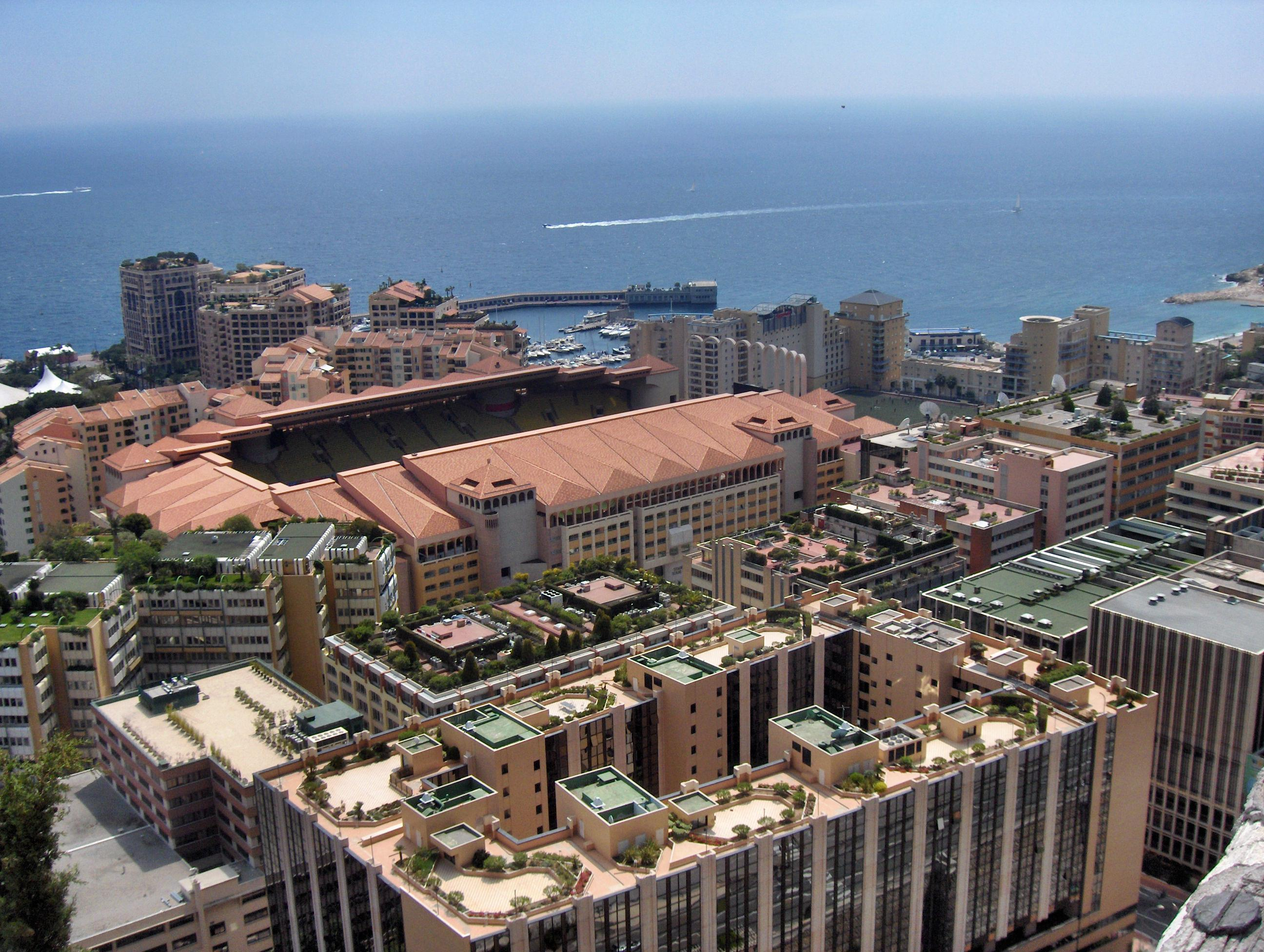
A top view of the stadium

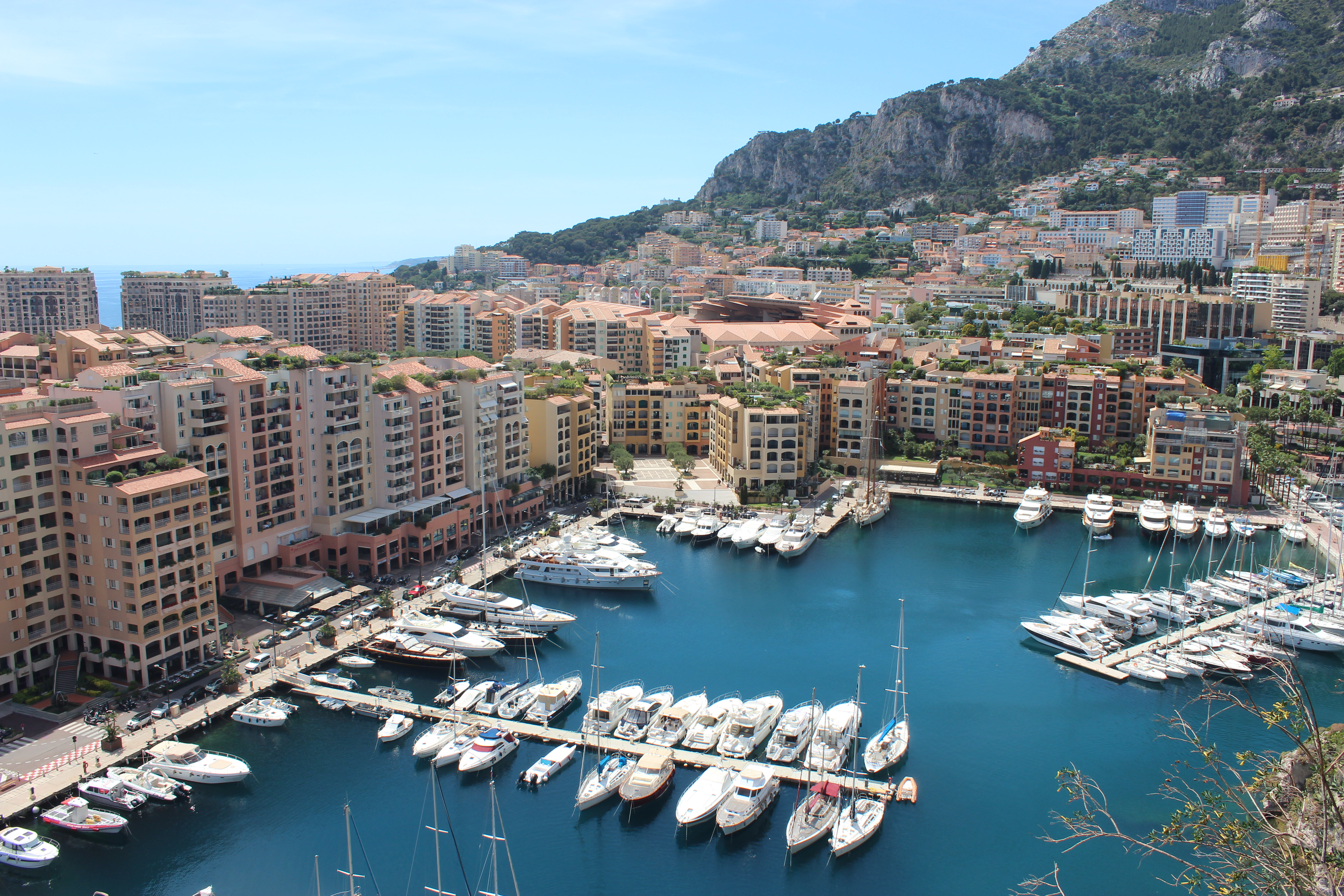
Fontvieille harbour

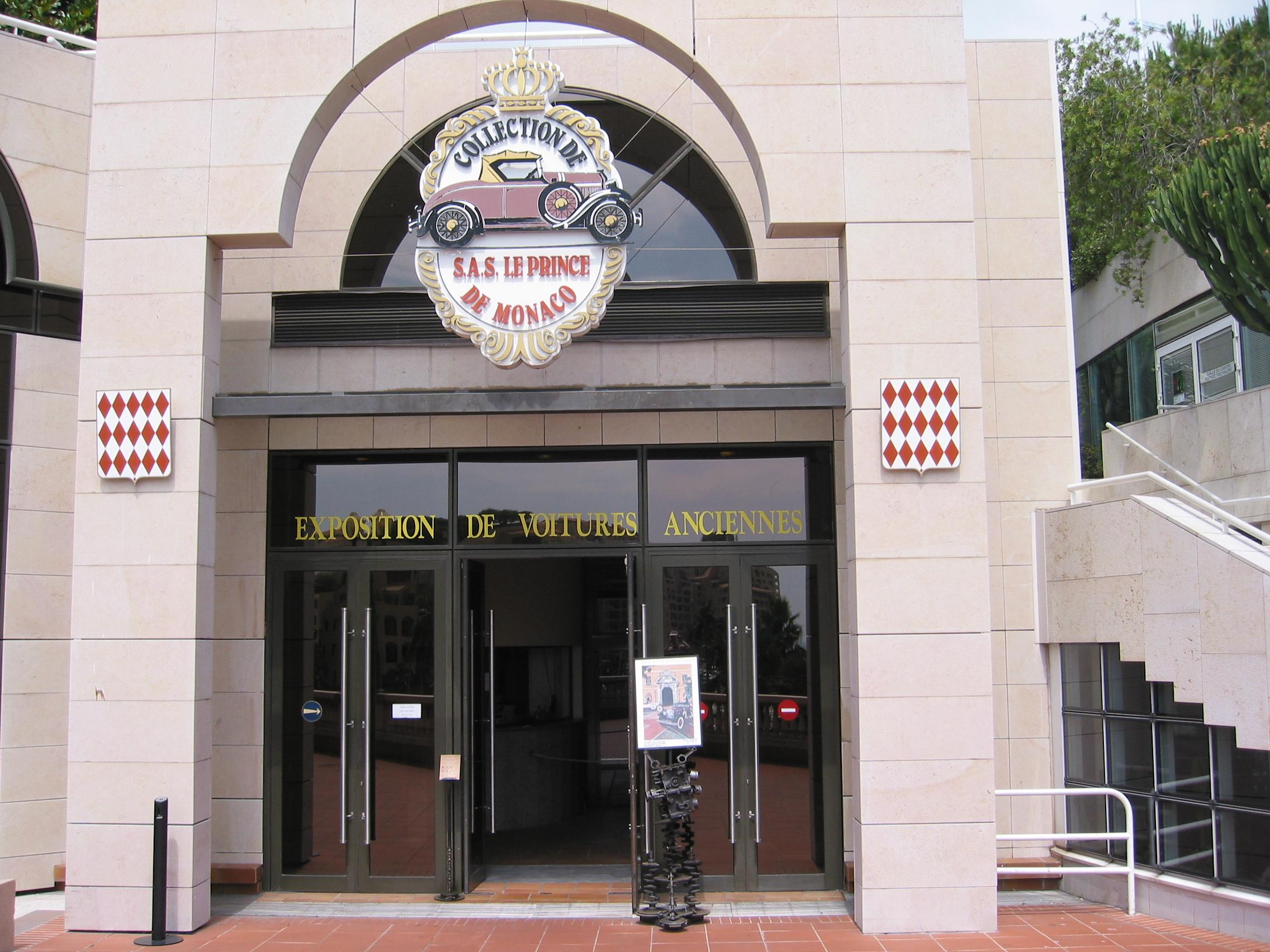
Entrance to the automobile museum

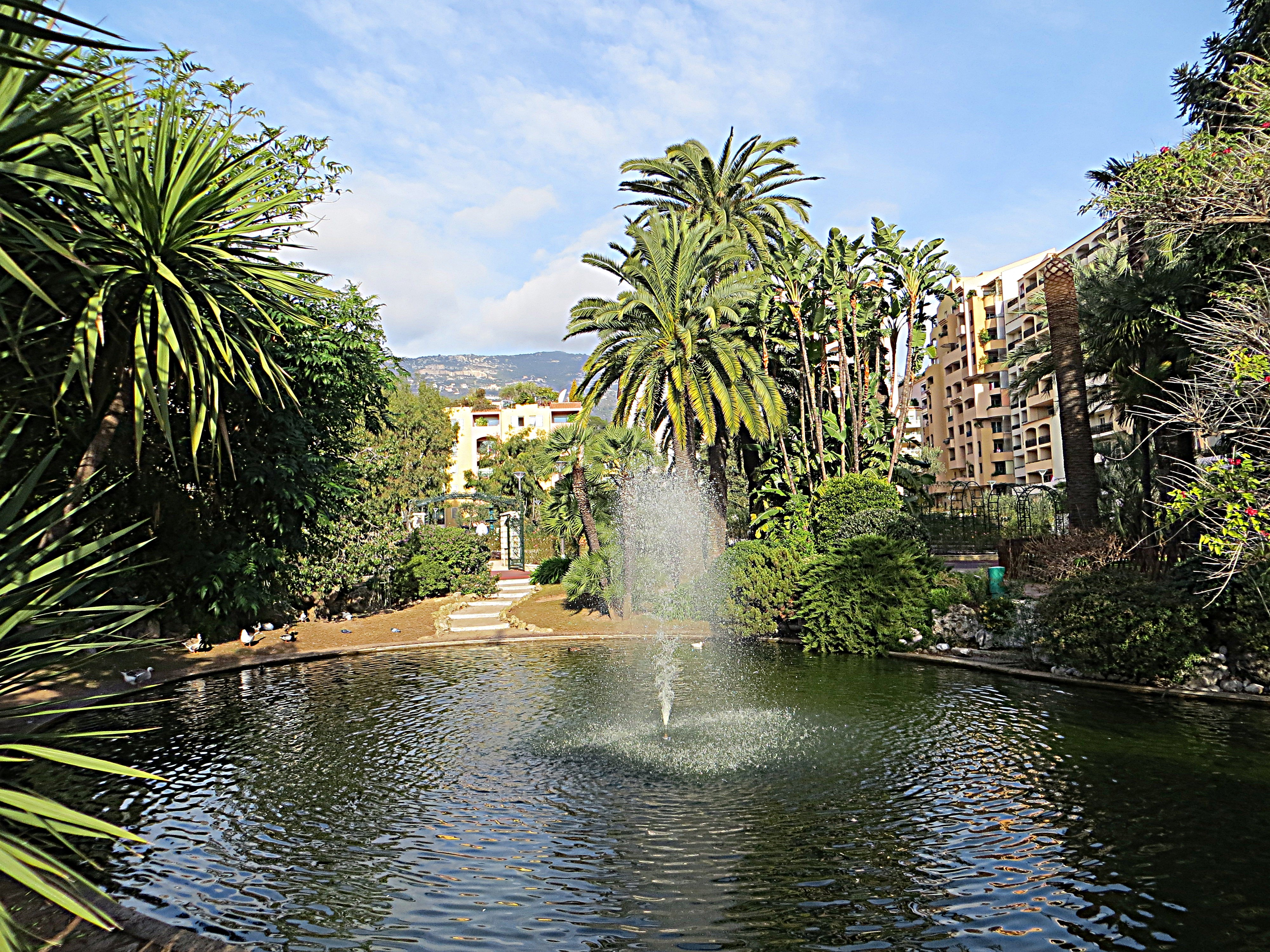
Princess Grace Rose Garden

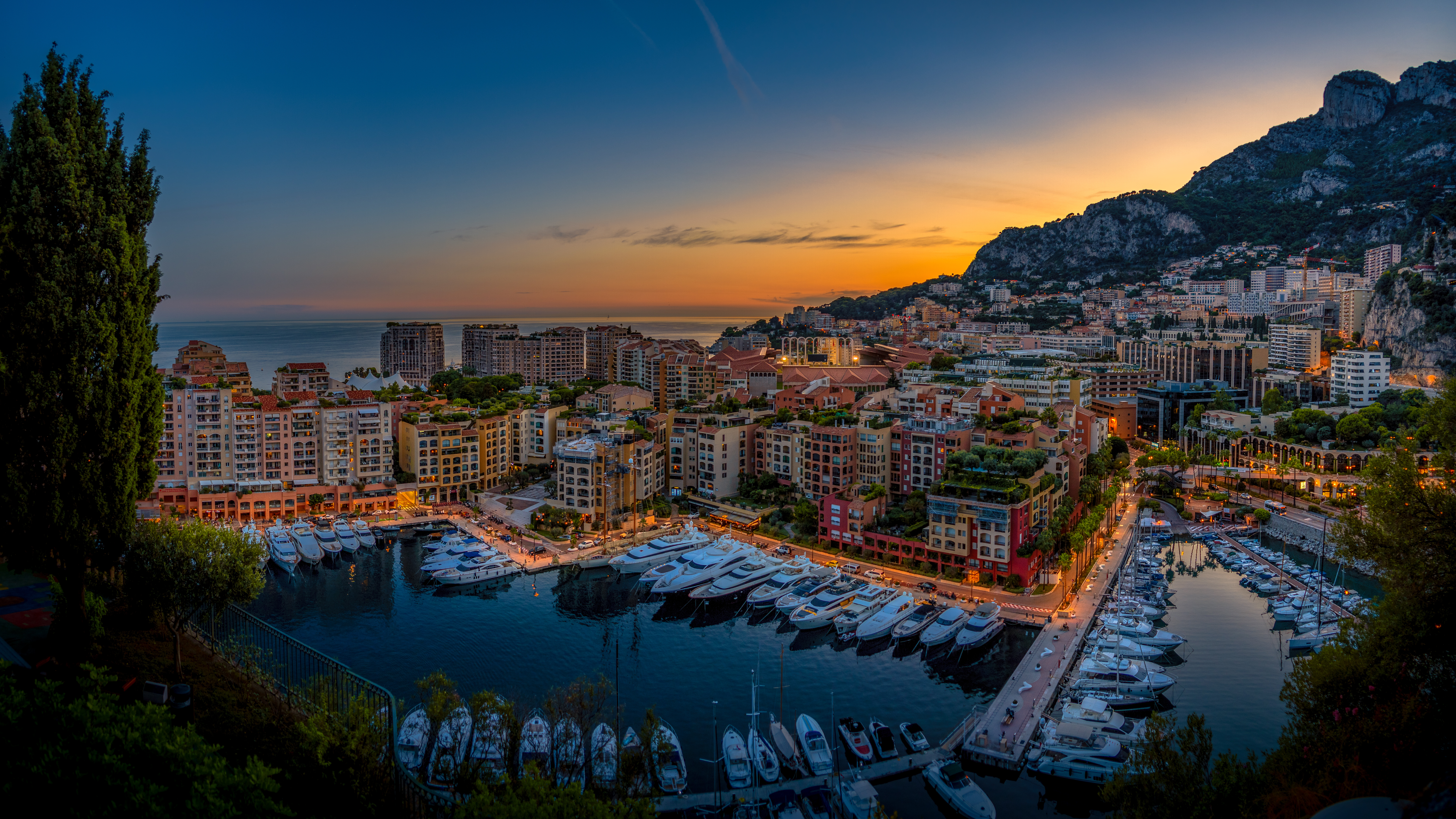
The harbour at dusk

== Notable people ==
- David and Frederick Barclay, English entrepreneurs
- Ken Bates, English hotelier
- Björn Borg, Swedish professional tennis player
- David Coulthard, Scottish racing driver
- Nicolas Ioannou, Cypriot businessman
- Firoz Kassam, Tanzanian entrepreneur
- Ken McCulloch, English hotelier
- Max Verstappen, Dutch racing driver

== See also ==
- Land reclamation in Monaco
- Municipality of Monaco
