= Guardians of Time (art) =

Art project of Manfred Kielnhofer

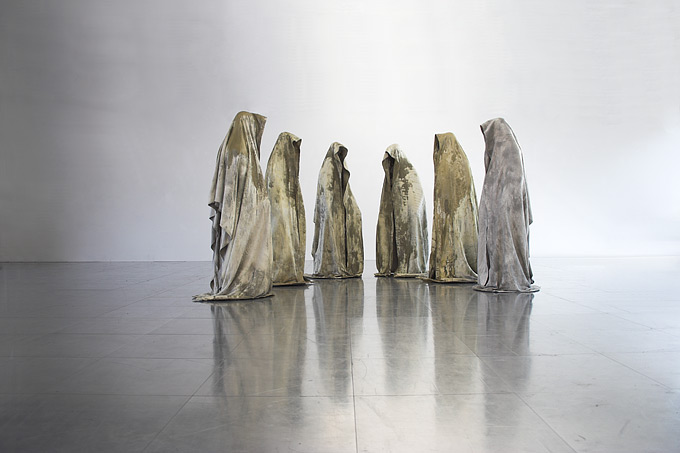
Time Guardians by Manfred Kielnhofer 2006

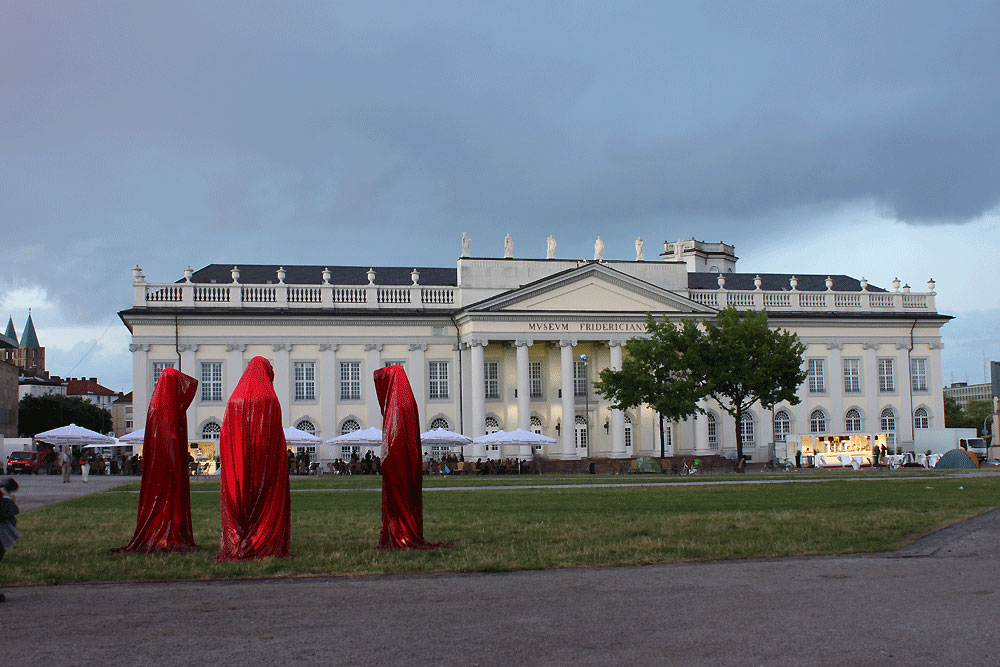
Occupy Kassel, documenta (13)

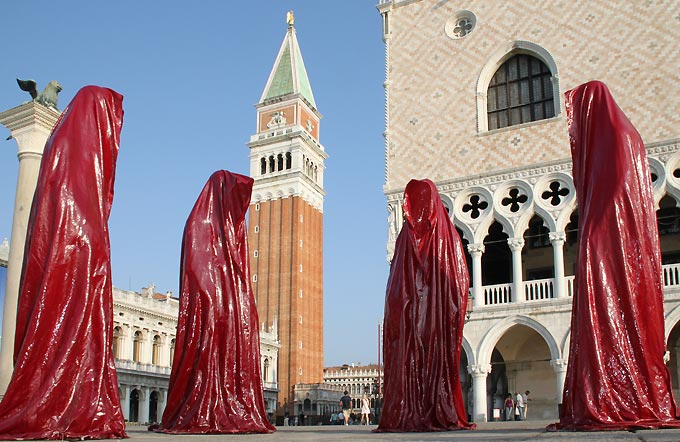
The light art project Guardians of Time on tour in Venice, St. Mark's Square, 2011

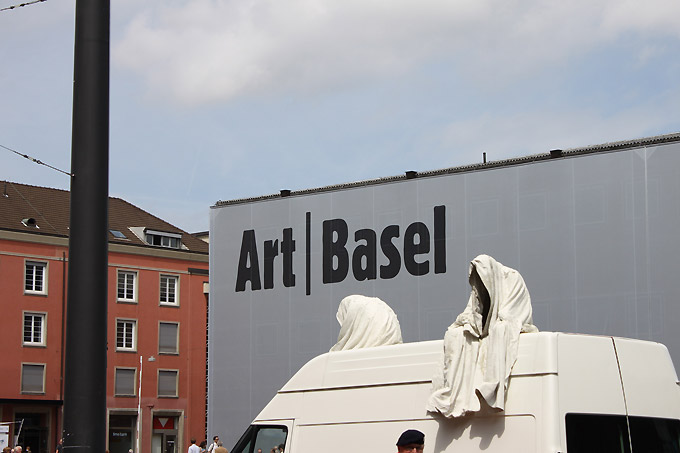
Public Art Project on Tour in Basel, Art Basel, Design Miami / Basel, Liste, Scope, Volta, 2011

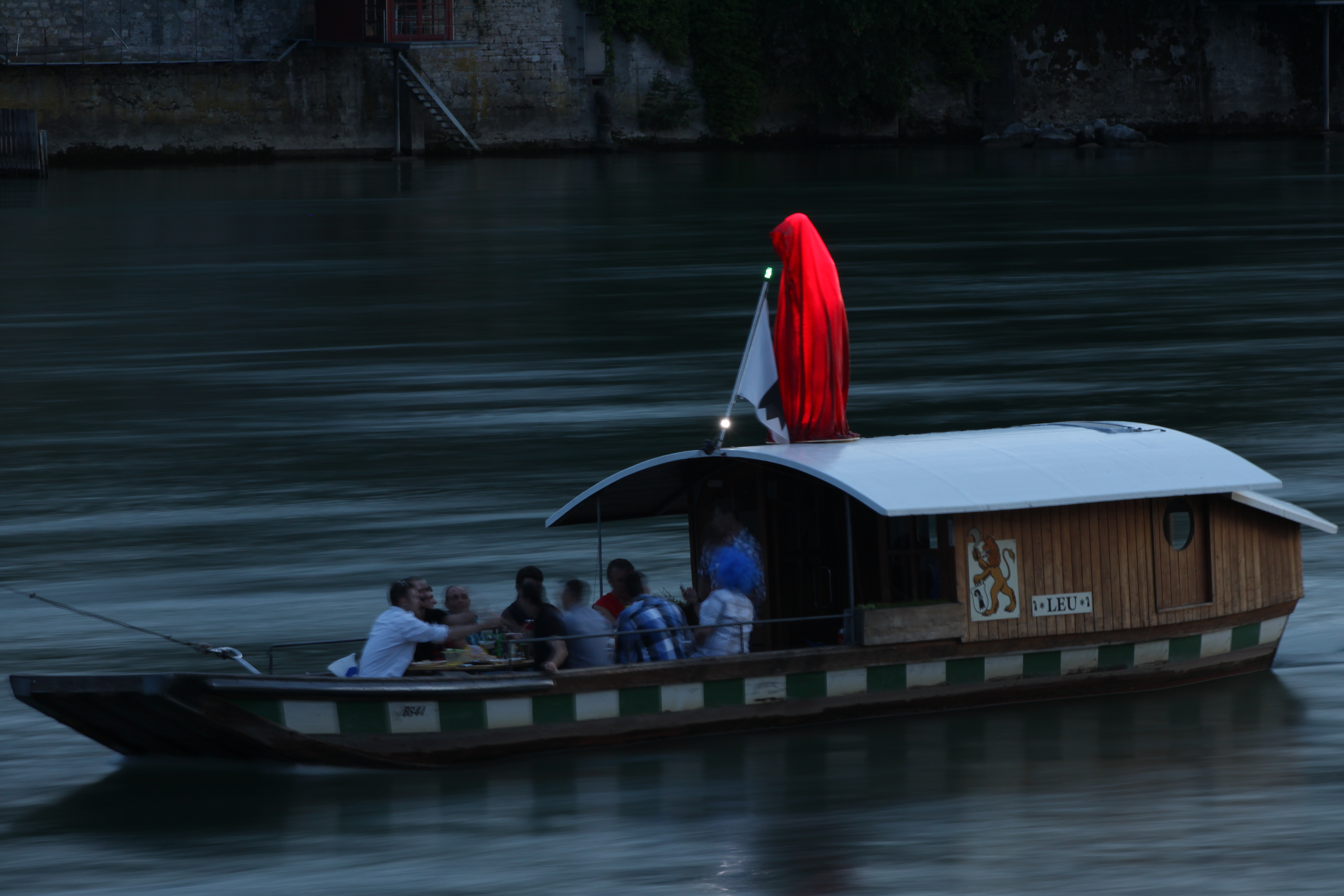
Ferryman to the Art Basel 2012

Guardians of Time, Festival of Lights (Berlin) French Cathedral, Berlin, Velotaxi 2011

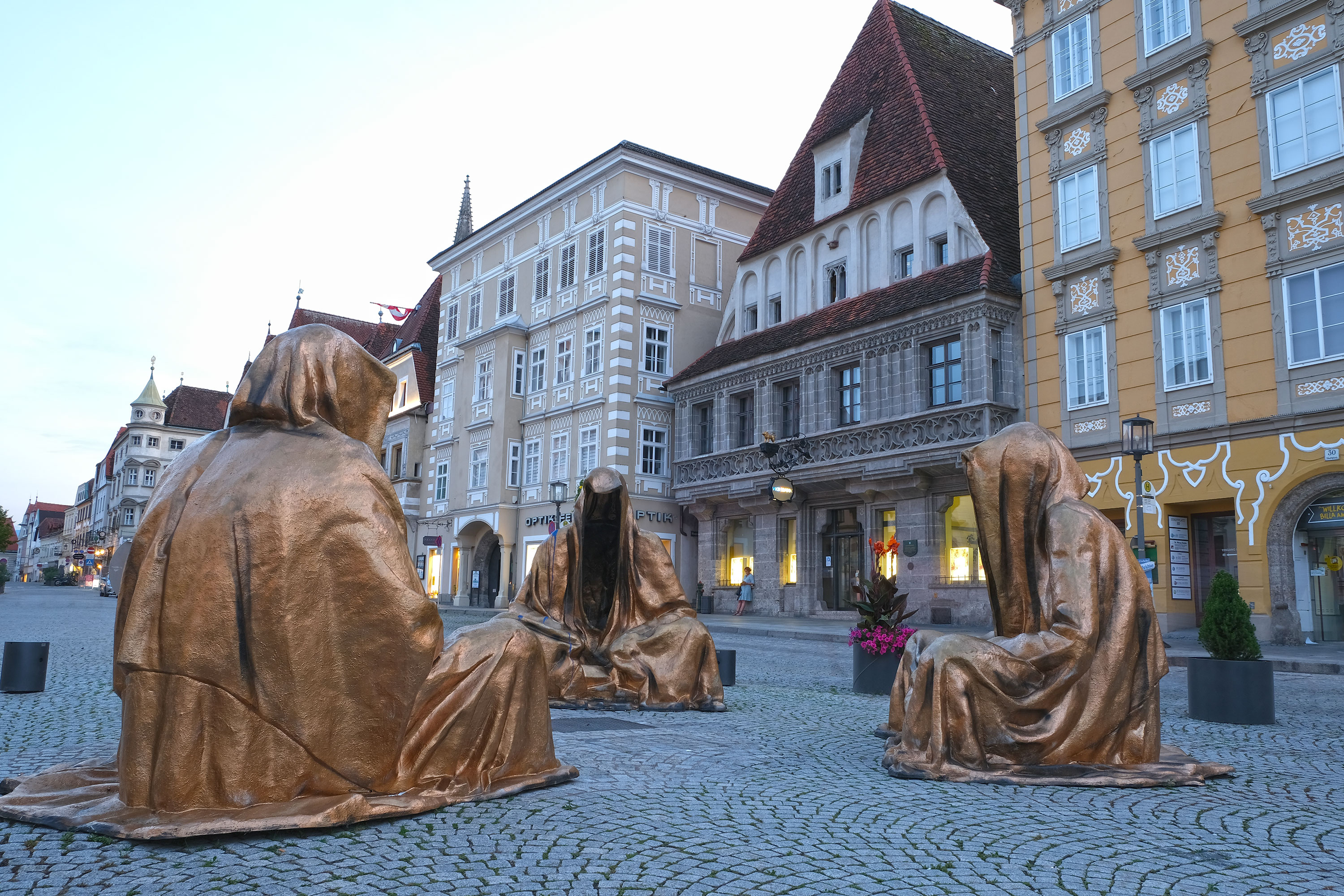
Giants GOT, Steyr

The Guardians of Time is an art project of the Austrian sculptor Manfred Kielnhofer.

== Idea and history ==
The Guardians of Time were developed by the artist Manfred Kielnhofer. Kielnhofer has always been interested in the human being as a model and potential source of danger, and believes that mankind is watched and protected by strange characters.

In 2006 he created the first life-size Time Guardians for the Skulpturenpark Artpark in Linz – a piece that resembles an assembly of monks. Over the years, he placed his "Time Guardians" in public places such as ancient castles, squares, old mines, or parks. Kielnhofer's art explores the human desire for security and reflects genuine exploration of the current historic moods and sensibilities.

In 2012, Kielnhofer designed the "Mini guards" as a limited edition made out of plastic in various colors that can be illuminated from within. One was ordered by Peter Weibel for the ZKM in 2012. The Guardians of Time settled in during Art Dubai 2013 and the first cast bronze guardian was made by the art foundry Krismer. In 2014, ancient giant people statues were shown at both the Festival of Lights in Berlin and at the 56th Venice Biennale Of Art. Kielnhofer also worked with glass at Berengo Studio in Murano, Venice and created a fine empty coat of white Carrara marble by Studio Massimo Galleni in 2016.

== Exhibitions ==
- 2006–2007. Gallery Artpark Linz – Skulpturenpark Artpark, Gallery Fotopark Linz, Time guardians on tournee
- 2008. Egon Schiele Art Centrum (CZ), Gallery Fontaine Amstetten, Black Box Gallery Copenhagen/Linz, art garden Graz;
- 2009. Cass Sculpture Fondation (UK), Art Vilnius together with Martina Schettina, Franz West and Herbert Brandl, Artfair Berlin-Arttower, Galerie Seywald Salzburg, Mobile-Galerie Hörsching, Woka Lamps Vienna
- 2010. Castle Schloss Steyregg near Linz, Neuköllner Kunstsalon Berlin, Galerie Kunst und Handel Graz, Kunstraum Ringstrassen, Light Art Biennale Austria 2010, Galerie Claudiana, Area 53 vienna, Citygalerie, Kunsthandel Freller
- 2011. Galerie Thiele Linz, Nord Art Germany, Kunstprojekt "ghost car" zur Art Basel, Liste, Scope, Volta Show, Festival of Lights Berlin, Grevenbroich Inseln des Lichtes, Kunsthaus Tacheles Berlin, Kunstverein Passau, ArtStays Ptuj Slovenia, Time guards on tour in Venice
- 2012. Designmonat Graz, Galerie Bachlechner, Sculpture show Castle Hartberg "Slow", Ferryman Ferry Basel public Art Basel show, Occupy movement DOCUMENTA (13) Kassel Time guards, Festival of Lights Berlin, Art & Antiques fair vienna sculpture garden
- 2013. Galerie Liebau Burghaun Fulda, Phantasten Museum Wien, Guardians of Time Settle in During Art Dubai, VBKW Künstlerparade Stuttgart, Phantasten Museum Wien, public art show Venice Biennale, SCOPE Art Show Basel Galerie Kunst und Handel, Art Bodensee Galerie Galerie Bachlechner, Austrian contemporary sculptures castle Tabor, Festival of Lights Berlin, art and antiques vienna fair, Kunstmesse Fulda Galerie Liebau, IC contemporary Istanbul art project Galerie Kunst und Handel Graz vienna, Wikam Art&Antiques fair vienna sculpture garden Galerie Kunst und Handel, Art&Antique vienna Hofburg Kunsthandel Freller
- 2014. Wiener internationale Kunst & Antiquitätenmesse Kunsthandel Freller, Art&Antique Residenz Salzburg Kunsthandel Freller, Skulpturensommer Galerie Liebau, WIKAM im Schloss Laxenburg Galerie Szaal, Highlights Art Basel public art, Kunst in der Fabrik II im GIZ Rosegg Galerie Kunst und Handel, public art Brussels and Amsterdam, ART Bodensee Galerie Galerie, Art Stays Festival Ptuj Slovenia, Art Salzburg Kunsthandel Freller, Woodlands Waterway Arts Bench Competition, Texas USA, Festival of Lights Berlin, WIKAM Galerie Kunst und Handel, Art&Antique Hofburg Vienna Kunsthandel Freller
- 2015. 56th Venice Biennale Of Art, Collateral Event – Personal Structures, Time Space Existence, Palazzo Mora, TRIO Biennial Three-dimensional Rio de Janeiro Biennial, ArtPrize Grand Rapids, Michigan USA
- 2016. 4th Dubai art award, ArtPrize Grand Rapids Michigan USA, Susan Mains gallery Grenada, Galerie am Museum in Frauenau, Festival of Lights Berlin, Artigo Rio de Janeiro art fair, Light festival Kolding Denmark
- 2017. Spotlight Festival Bucharest RO, Muralharbor Linz A, Museum Modern Art Hünfeld D, Guerilla art Documenta Kassel, ArtPrize ArtPrize Grand Rapids Michigan USA, Swell Sculpture Festival Gold Coast AU, Festival of Lights Berlin, Kunst Zürich, Beijing China TaiKooLi mall
- 2018. Toronto Light Fest, arte in fiera Italia – Kunst und Handel gallery, Lightart Zwickau, Swiss Triennial Festival of Sculpture Bad RagARTz, PAN Awareness Projekt #TheEyeofGuardian Ghana Afrika, Galerie Spittelberg Passage, Festival of Lights Berlin, Biennale Arte Salerno Italia, Tabakfabrik Linz
- 2019. Toronto Light Fest, artvienna wikam art dealer Freller, Lichtgalerie Cottbus, PAN Austria Galerie, Gleis21 Dietikon Swiss,
- 2020. Stadtplatz Steyr, Exhibition of three golden statues on the historic town square, purchased by the local government

== Publications ==
- 2006: in the online database of MAK Museum of Applied Arts (Vienna) Design-Info-Pool-Online
- 2006: Manfred Kielnhofer. Exhibition Catalogue Artpark digitalprint Linz, Gallery ARTpark Lenaupark City Linz.
- 2007: Time guardians Exhibition Catalog digitalprint Linz, Gallery ARTpark Lenaupark City Linz.
- 2008: Masters Contemporary Arts, Collectible Global Art Book ISBN 978-91-89685-18-5
- 2008: Trends Contemporary Arts, Collectible Global Art Book ISBN 978-91-89685-17-8
- 2009: Cass Sculpture Foundation (UK) Manfred Kielnhofer's Timeguards, the Foundation's newest arrivals
- 2011: NordArt, Kunstwerk Carlshütte ISBN 978-3-9813751-2-1
- 2011: Festival of Lights, Berlin Impressionen
- 2011: 500 x Art in Public, Chris van Uffelen, Braun publishing ISBN 978-3-200-02461-8
- 2012: Kunstforum Bd. 217 dOCUMENTA (13), Ein Rundgang, page 80,81
- 2012: ST/A/R Printmedium Wien – Berlin, page 58
- 2012: Berliner Morgenpost cover page, Festival of Lights
- 2013: Ice Contemporary Istanbul art fair magazine page 41–45
