= Skulpturenpark Artpark =

Sculpture garden in Linz, Austria

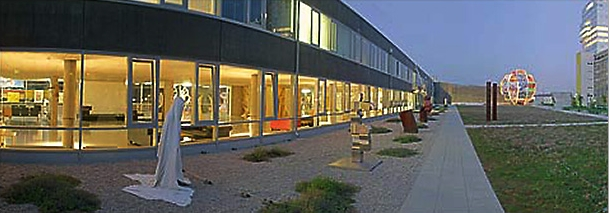
- Skulpturenpark Artpark Linz, 2006
- Interactive map of Skulpturenpark Artpark
- Type: Sculpture garden
- Location: Austria
- Nearest city: Linz
- Coordinates: 48°17′31″N 14°18′15″E
- Area: Over 5.000 square meters
- Created: 2006

The Skulpturenpark Artpark (Sculpture garden Artpark) is a sculpture garden in the city of Linz, Austria, where more than 20 artists had created their sculptures. The size of the garden is over 5.000 square meters.

== Situation ==
The Skulpturenpark Artpark is situated in the quarter 'Lenaupark', district Lustenau of Linz, on the roof of the shopping-center Lenaupark City. It is the only cultural institution of this part of the city. Lenaupark has 43.000 m^{2} project space and is so the largest district-project of urban renewal in Austria outside Vienna.

== History and concept ==
This project in Linz was launched by the artist Manfred Kielnhofer. The opening was in 2006 and since this time the park si expanding every year.

The quarter Lenaupark, which was a train station in former times, measures about 43.000 m^{2}. 2004 the developing project for urban renewal starts. One year later the shopping-center "Lenaupark-City" opens. The visual artist Manfred Kielnhofer, who leaves nearby, has the idea to start a cultural project there as well. The constructor of the buildings in the quarter Lenaupark, Johann Brandstetter, is himself a collector and sponsor for arts. So he helps the young artists association around Kielnhofer.

In Skulpturenpark Artpark you can find sculptures from Jonathan Borofsky, dEmo (Eladio de Mora), Manfred Kielnhofer, Robert Mittringer, Arnold Pichler, Erwin Reiter, Martina Schettina, Manfred Schöller, Pinuccio Sciola and Gerhard Wünsche.

== Sculptures ==
- Carlos Anglberger: Five letters, 5 parts, concrete, 2006–2008
- Jonathan Borofsky: Numbersn, concrete, ca. 50x100x30 cm each.
- dEmo (Eladio de Mora), bears. Polyester.
- Willi Kern: Venus. Clay. 250 cm high. 2006.
- Manfred Kielnhofer, Wächter, gypsum and polyester ca. 200 cm high. 2007.
- Manfred Koutek, Slidable lattice grate, painted road barrier, ca. 80 x 300 cm. 2009.
- Christoph Luckeneder: Light cactuses.
- Robert Mittringer: No title, 120 x 300 x 30 cm
- Arnold Pichler: Spearhead 60x100x120 cm, Stainless steel and steel, 2007
- Martina Schettina, Cucumber and tomatoes. Readymade. fruit, acrylic basement, ca. 100 cm high. 2009
- Manfred Schöller: Lightarc -Nonarc 250 cm high, metal, 2007
- Der Steiner, love=hate (Zerobudgeting), concrete,
- Der Steiner: Kisses for me iron, 200 x 180 cm, 2007
- Erwin Reiter: Dancer, stainless steel, 140x140x220 cm
- Gerhard Wünsche: The Queen, concrete on basement, 60x60x280 cm, 2006

== Gallery ==
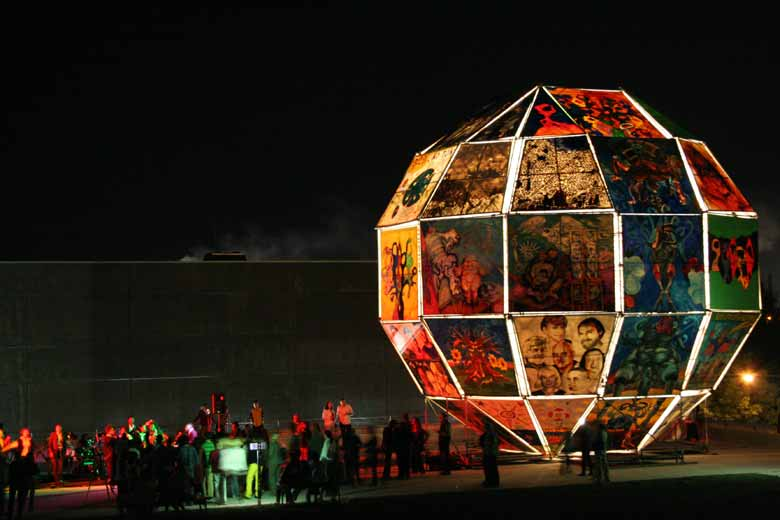
Globe of integration 2006

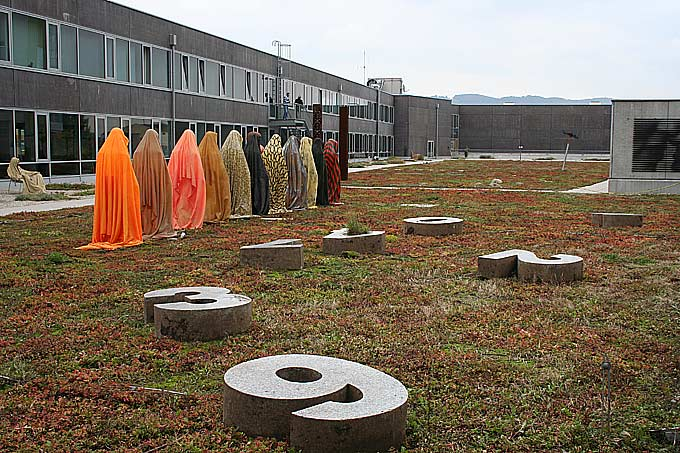
Numbers by Jonathan Borofsky 2009

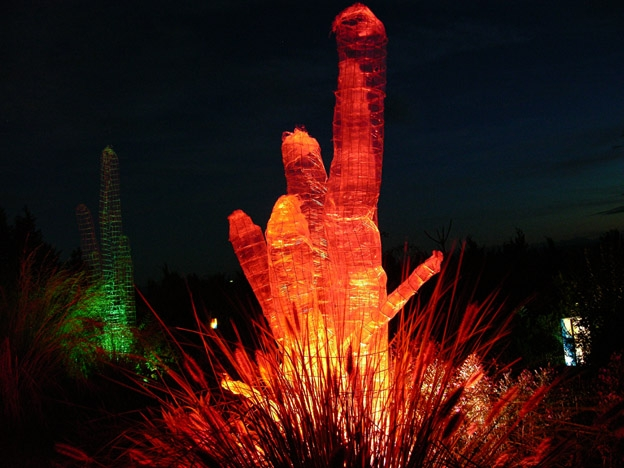
Light cactuses by Christoph Luckeneder 2009

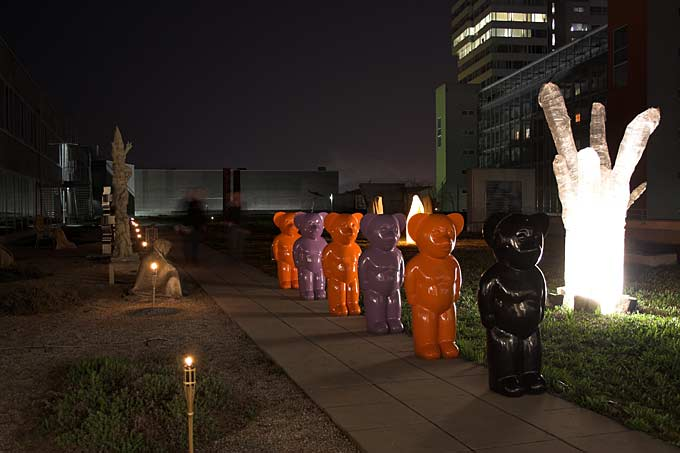
Bears by dEmo 2009

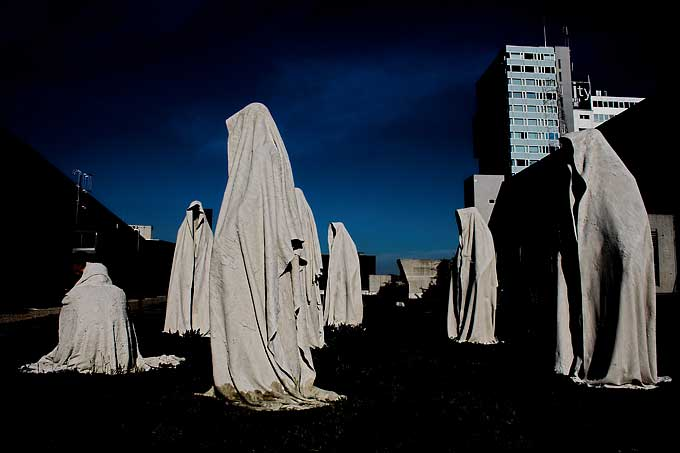
Guardians of Time (Art) by Manfred Kielnhofer, 2008

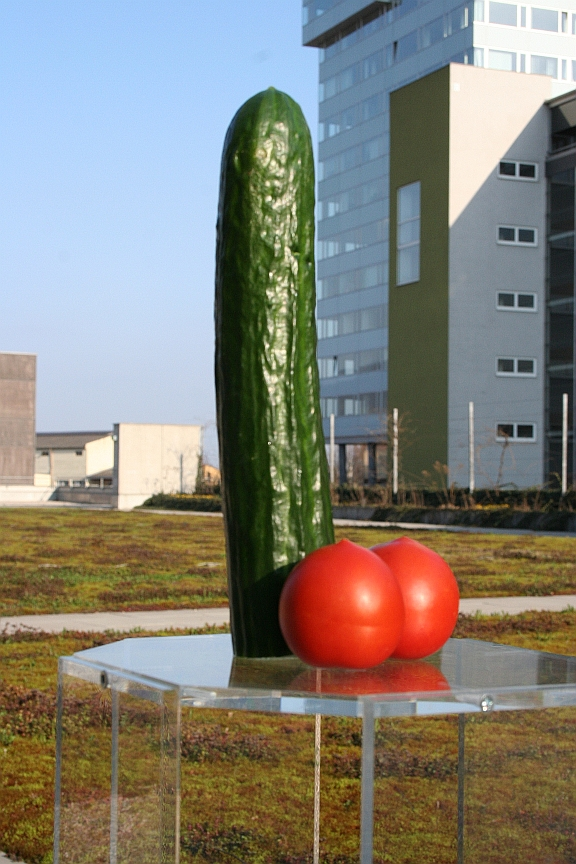
Readymade Cucumer and tomatoes by Martina Schettina, 2009

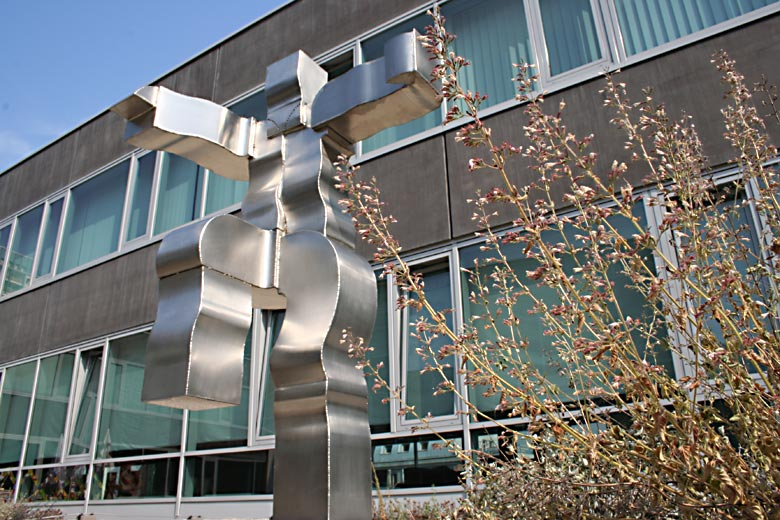
Dancer by Erwin Reiter, 2008

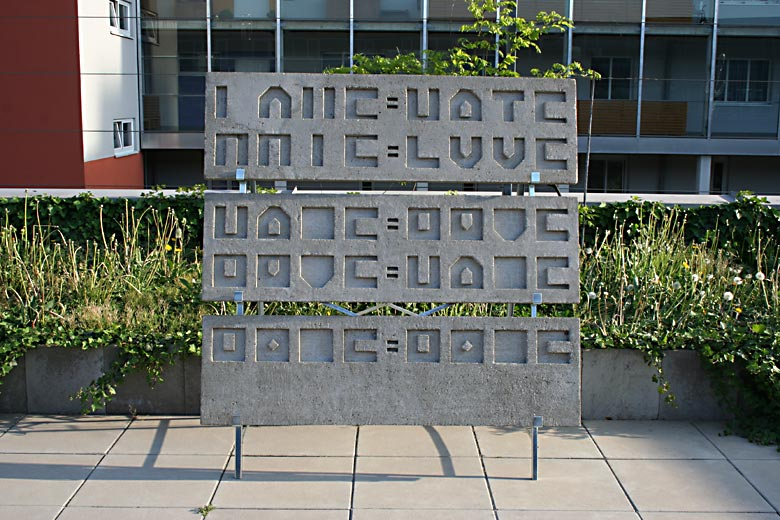
love=hate by Der Steiner, 2008

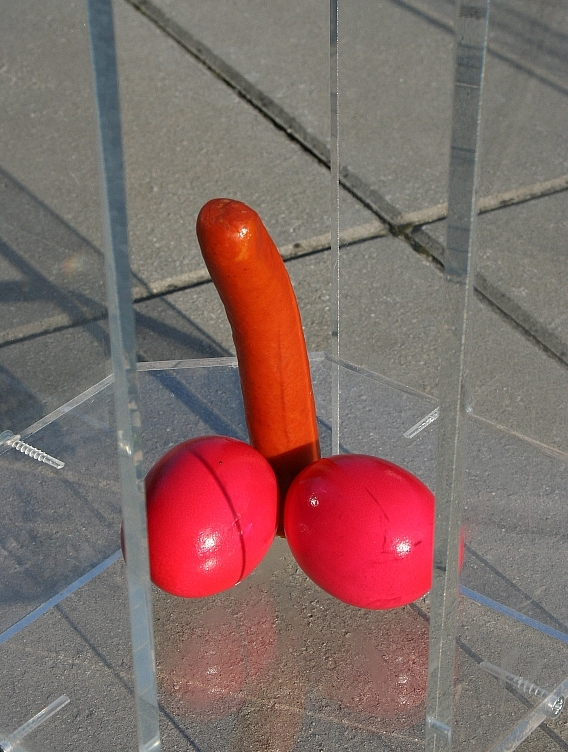
Happy Easter! Readymade by Martina Schettina 2009

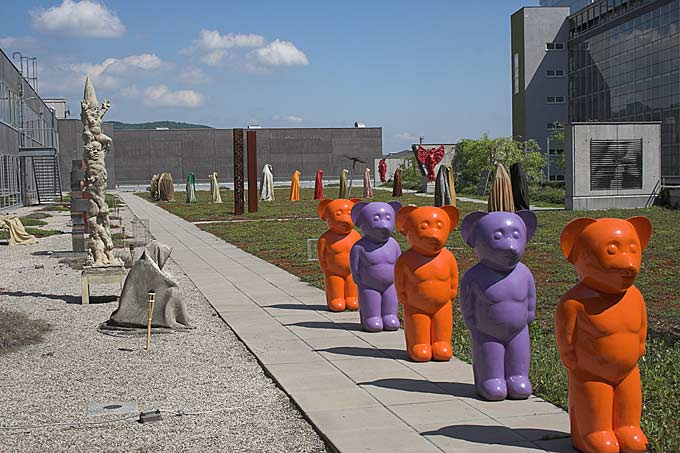
Bears by dEmo im Skulpturenpark Artpark, 2009

Kisses for me by Der Steiner 2007

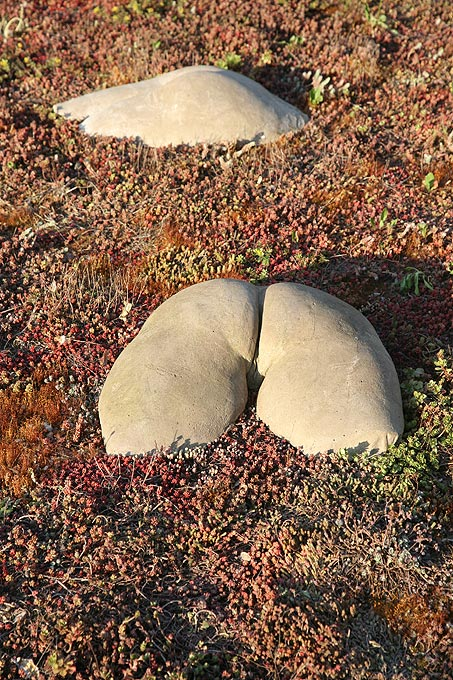
Four letters by Carlos Anglberger, 2006 - 2008

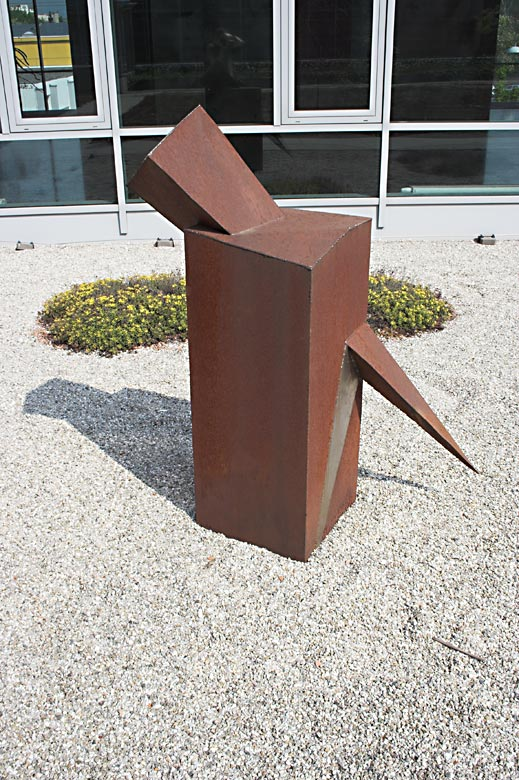
Spearhead by Arnold Pichler 2007

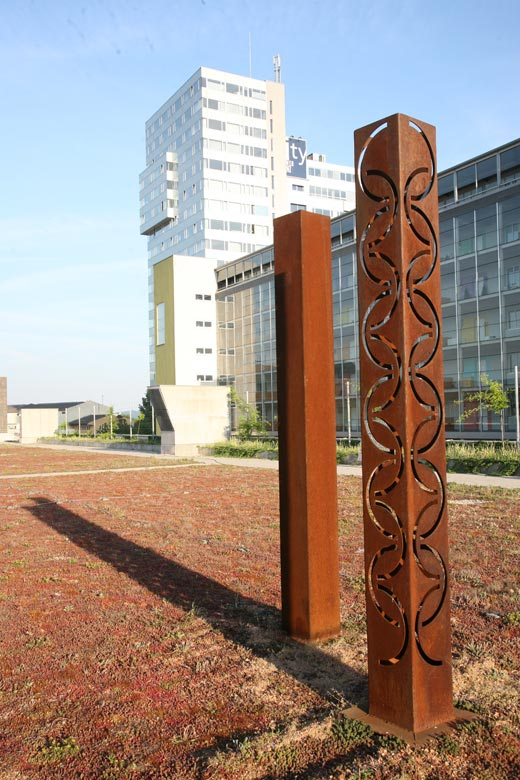
Lightarc-Nonarc by Manfred Schöller 2007

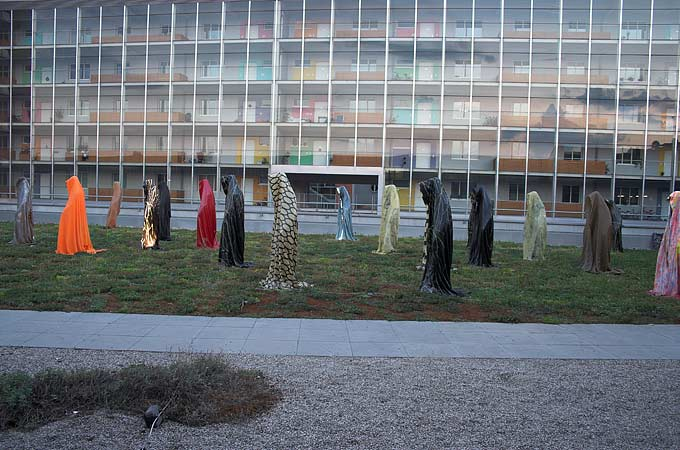
Time Guardians by Manfred Kielnhofer, 2008

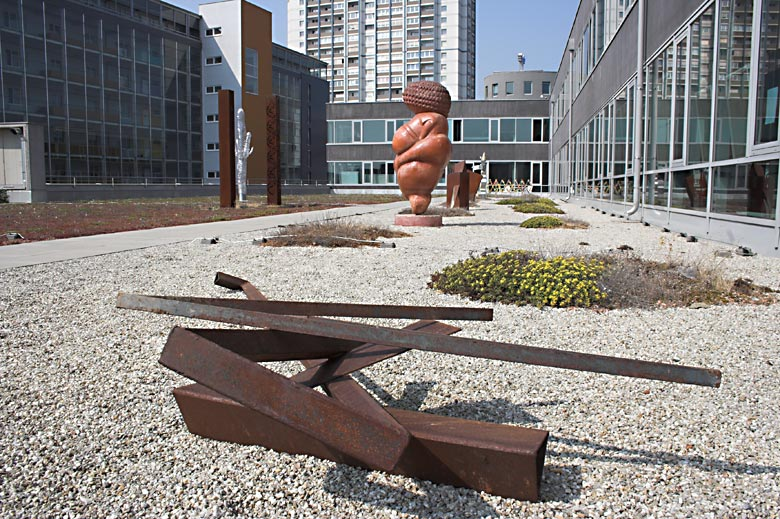
No title by Robert Mittringer in front and Venus by Willi Kern

== Arrangements ==
Once a year- on the first Wednesday in April - the new season of the sculpture garden is acclaimed. The new sculptures are presented.

The Skulpturenpark Artpark can be visited from April to October.

== Publications ==
- Lit ges Magazin for Literatur and more
- Austria Journal
- catalogue Skulpturenpark 2007
- Dobusch F., Mayr J. (pblsh.): Linz - Stadt der Arbeit und Kultur. Linz: Gutenberg-Werbering (1997)(German)
- Stadtforschung Linz: CD-ROM Linz 2000. Fakten, Bilder, Grafiken. Linz (2000)(German)
