= Light Art Biennale Austria 2010 =

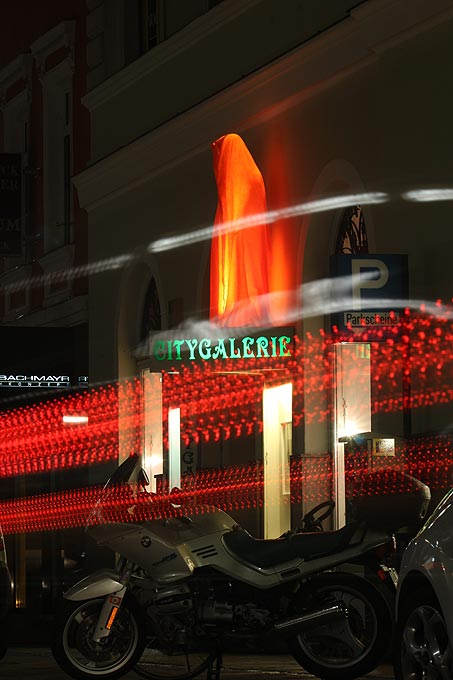
Light Art Biennale in Linz, Manfred Kielnhofer: Guardians of Time (Art)

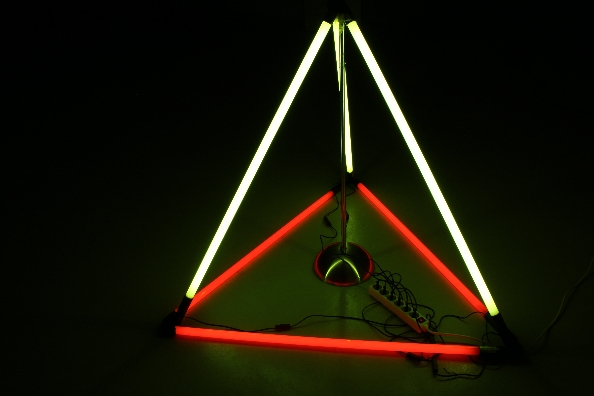
Martina Schettina: Tetrahedron

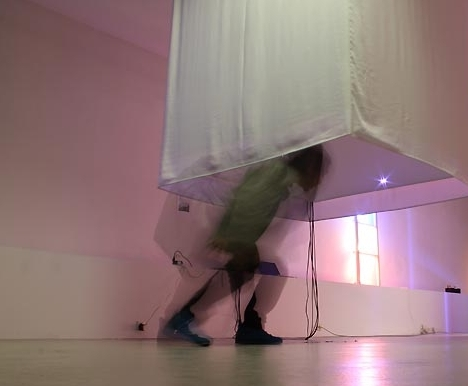
Manabu Shimada: Paper floaty cube, 2010

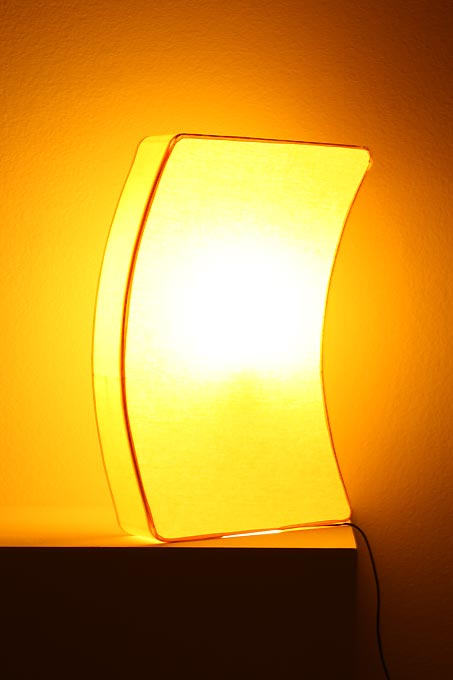
Heidulf Gerngross: Archiquants lamp

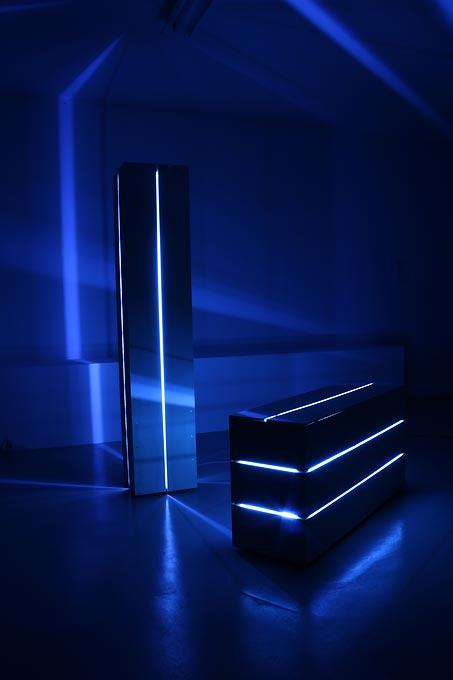
Artwork by Mounty R. P. Zentara

The Light Art Biennale Austria 2010 (German: Biennale für Lichtkunst Austria 2010) is the first biennale for light art in Austria. About 60 artists from 21 countries and 4 continents participate.

== Facts ==
The "Biennale für Lichtkunst Austria 2010" is a non-commercial biennale of light art-projects and the first biennale of light art that happened in Austria. The biennale 2010 has the slogan "private light in public spaces" and runs in several Austrian cities in the autumn of 2010. It started on September 1 in Linz, at nearly the same time as the Ars Electronica festival which started on September 2. The organisation is done by Gallery Artpark Linz, consultant is Peet Thomsen (USA/Copenhagen/Linz). The selection of the artists was curated. Members of the jury were artists and curators, one of them Laura Plana Gracia from Spain.

== Concept ==
This first Biennale for Light Art in Austria wants to generate a cut surface between society and art. The spontaneous conjunction with art in public spaces leans on the art concept of Joseph Beuys from 1965 "How to define the paintings to the dead rabbit" in Düsseldorf. A dialogue should arise between art and the public. The concept was made by the two founders of the Light Art Biennale, Manfred Kielnhofer and Martina Schettina.

== Financial support ==
The Biennale für Lichtkunst Austria 2010 is supported by the cultural boards of Upper Austria, Lower Austria and the City Linz as well as companies and private sponsors.

The opening in September took place in Linz and September 4, 2010 in Perchtoldsdorf. The Light Art Biennale Austria 2010 runs from September to December 2010, the final Exhibition will take place in Vienna. The documentation of the biennale includes a blog, a website and a catalogue.

== Artists (selection) ==
- Norbert Francis Attard (Malta/DE)
- Carlo Bernardini (IT)
- Juanli Carrión (ES)
- Stanley Casselman (USA)
- Sarawut Chutiwongpeti (Thailand)
- Fabrizio Corneli (IT)
- Titia Ex (NL)
- Heidulf Gerngross (AT)
- Hofstetter Kurt (AT)
- Hideo Iwasaki (JP)
- Manfred Kielnhofer (AT)
- Thorbjørn Lausten (DK)
- Eric Michel (FR)
- Alexandre Murucci (BRA)
- Joaquin Gasgonia Palencia (PH)
- Jaanika Peerna (USA)
- Jason Peters (USA)
- Suzy Poling (USA)
- Erwin Redl (AT/USA)
- Seth Riskin (USA)
- John Routhledge (UK)
- Peter Sandbichler (AT)
- Martina Schettina (AT)
- Reto Schölly (CH/DE)
- Manabu Shimada (JP/UK)
- Phil Stearns (USA)
- Rob Voerman (NL)
- Patrice Warrener (FR)
- Richard Williams (IR)
- Samson Young (CH)
- Mounty R. P. Zentara (AT)
- Pomodoro Bolzano (= Max D. Well, Christian Wittkowsky, Andreas Müller und Detlef Thomas) (DE)
- Two People one work (= Mounty R. P. Zentara und Karin Sulimma) (A)

== Further information ==
The Biennale is inspired by a similar Biennale, which was held in the Ruhrgebiet. The Austrian's theme for the first edition of the Biennale will be "Private Light in Public Spaces". The name a gentle teasing of the German Light Art Biennale "Open Light in Private Spaces". The "Light Art Biennale Austria 2010" has been invited to the contemporary art ruhr (C.A.R.) 2010 in Essen, Welterbe Zollverein as an official part of the European Capital of Culture-program Ruhr.2010.

== Future ==
The Light art Biennale Austria will be held every two years in various cities in Austria.

== See also ==
- Lichtstadt Feldkirch
