= Rolling Stars and Planets =

Rolling Stars and Planets is an Austrian visual art project of exhibitions and performances with sphere objects. The project mastered by Elisabeth Ledersberger-Lehoczky is joined by about 25 artists who come mostly from Austria, but also from Hungary and Germany.

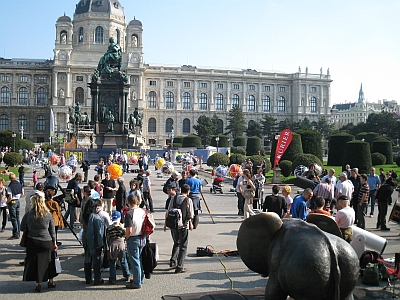
First performance of Rolling Stars and Planets in front of Kunsthistorisches Museum Vienna

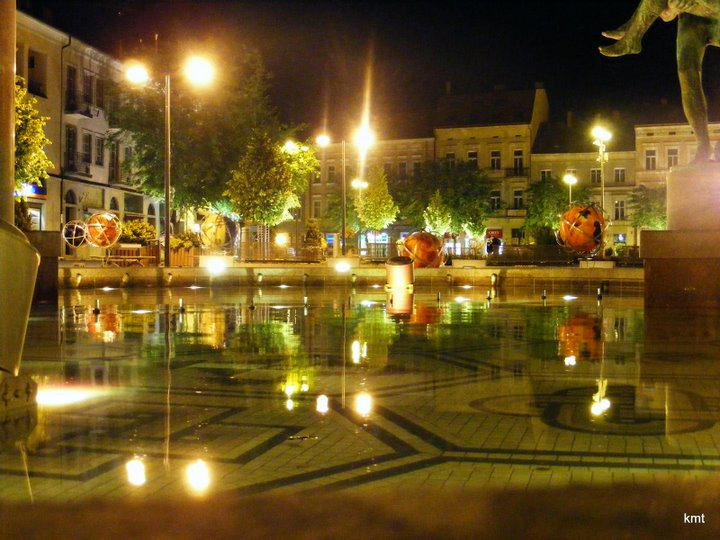
Exhibition in Szombathely, Ungarn

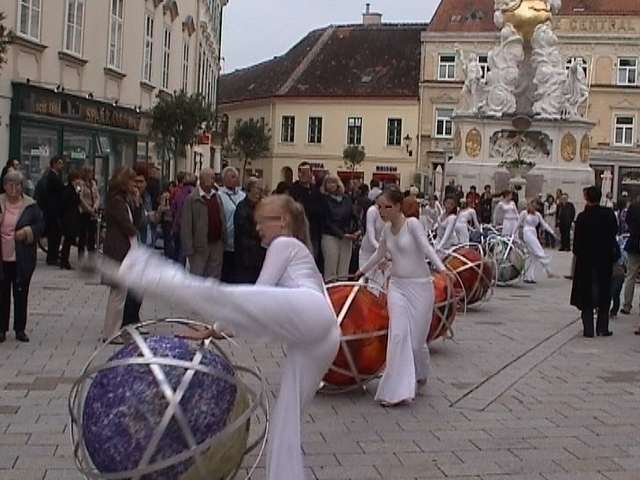
Dance performance in Baden, Lower Austria

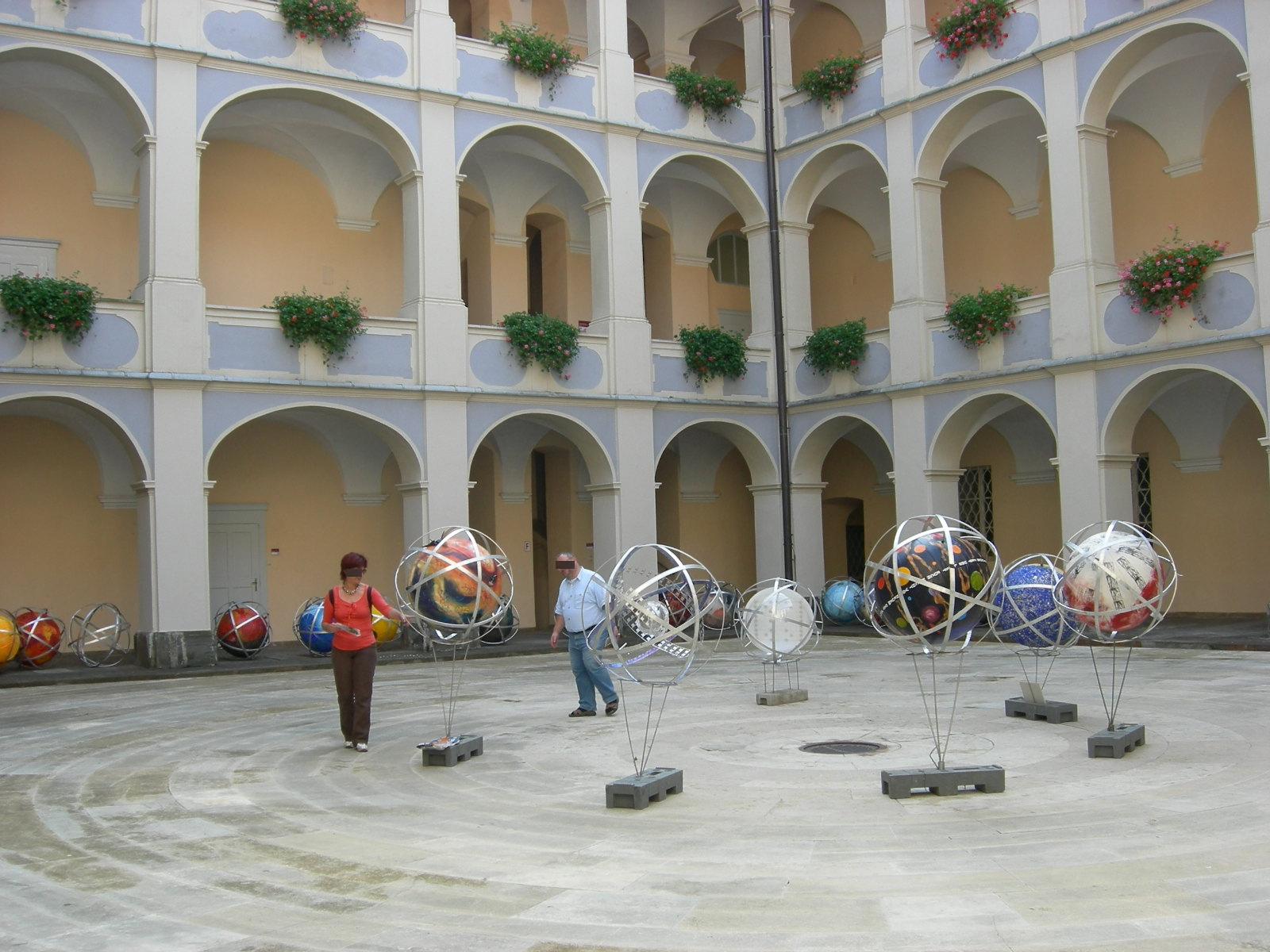
Exhibition in Piber Castle, Styria

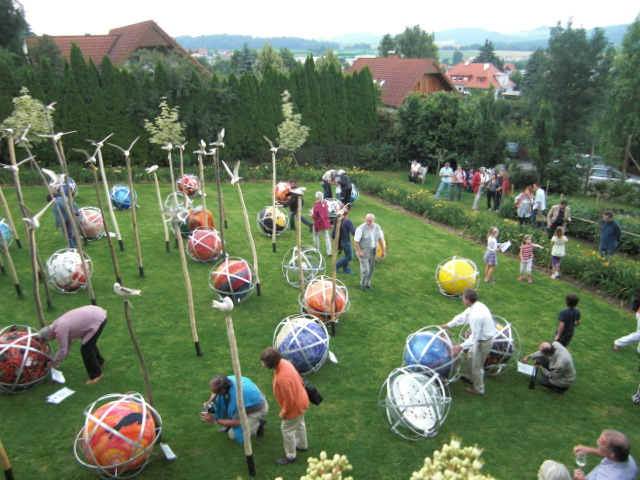
Garden and Art; bellabayer - the Gardenatelier, Hartberg, Styria

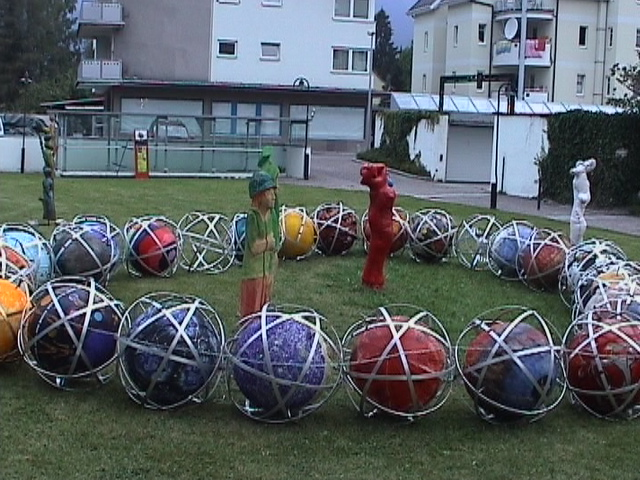
Exhibition in Reutte, Tyrol

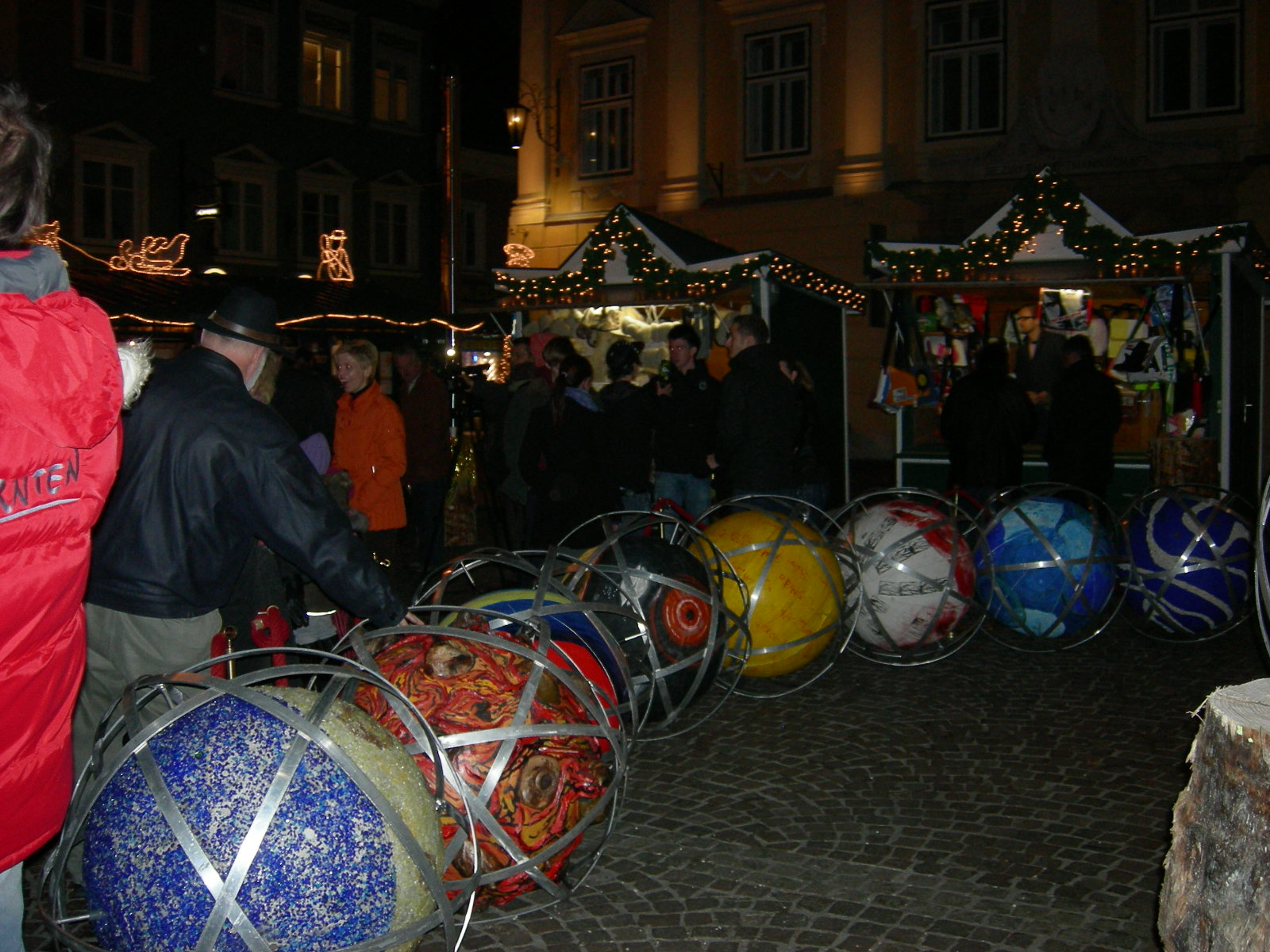
Exhibition in St. Veit an der Glan, Carinthia

== Design ==
The Rolling Stars and Planets are spherical art objects, standardized in size and basic material, but individually designed by each artist. The globes are painted, or designed as objects. The circumfluent frame, concepted by Ledersberger-Lehoczky, consist of ring-shaped Aluminium-hoops with a diameter of about 100 cm. This frame is associated with the orbits of Celestial bodies. It provides the reservation of the artworks and alleviates the moving.

The inner Parts with a diameter of about 75 cm have been designed by the artist individually using themes like Astronomy, Astrology, Mythology and Legends.

== Development ==
In Autumn 2008 Ledersberger-Lehoczky and István Jankovics organized a Symposium in the Gothard Observatorium of Astrophysics of the Eötvös Loránd University in Szombathely. The main Theme was "Men in space". During this event sculptures of five sculptors have been shown. During the "Planetra Science Congress" 2008 in Münster Ledersberger-Lehoczky presented an art project which was decided to accompany the Year of Astronomy 2009.

A collective action with individual designed sphere-objects was arranged during a meeting in Vienna between Günther Frank and Elisabeth Ledersberger-Lehoczky. Günther Frank suggested the moving of the globes in public spaces.

In the Year of Astronomy 2009 25 visual artists, many of them members of the Austrian association of professional art in Vienna and Graz, designed spherical paintings and objects. The artists used techniques like Painting, Collage or Object Art.

Adapted to each globe painting the executing artist made a description, in which he declared his technique and the matter of his artwork.

The first event started on April 4, 2009 in front of the Kunsthistorischen Museum in Vienna. The artists rolled their artworks around the Maria Theresia-monument.

In May 2009 the BiondekBühne Theater- und Tanzwerkstatt in Baden near Vienna created a choreography for a group of 14 dancers, the "Ladies-First-Ladies". This choreography concerned with the Rolling Stars and Planets was shown in Baden and in Linz while this City was European Capital of Culture. The performancers SF - SlowForward showed the choreography "Breath of the Cosmos", which had been especially created for the Rolling Stars and Plandets. Linz September 3, 2009

== Participating Artists ==
=== Artists and titles ===
1. Johannes Angerbauer: Golden Star - Back to Earth
2. Lisa Bäck: Seelen-Welt
3. Ulrike Chladek: Per Artes ad Astra
4. Günther Frank: Meine kleine Welt
5. Susanne Fruhwirth-Nievoll: Sonne
6. Edeltraud Führer: Von der Erde bis an den Rand der Ewigkeit
7. Silvia Gröbner: Lichtgruß der Libellen
8. I.FLOW: Braucht es noch einen Titel?
9. Christine Kertz: Himmel und Hölle
10. C.F.J. König: Himmelskörper
11. Gerhard Kramer: Hinter dem Mond
12. Milan Jan Krkoska: Eine Vision
13. Beate Landen-Karlhuber: Don't make it happen
14. Elisabeth Ledersberger-Lehoczky: Alles dreht sich
15. Johannes Lehner: Sonne
16. MACON (Maria Consuelo des Speis Vargas) (seit Sommer 2009):Boot People I
17. Edda Mally (Seit Anfang 2010): Das Auge des Kosmos
18. Claudia Mezzina-Macher: Il Punto in Piu
19. Tamara O´Byrne:47.487BG/10.732 LG
20. Oroszy Csaba (HU): o.T.
21. Renate Polzer: Blue Moon Blues
22. Christian Reichhold: Rolling Stars
23. Martina Schettina: Die Sonne
24. Michael Schlapschy: Fire Star
25. Uwe Schwarz (D): Urmutter
26. Anga Sterrenberg: Schach
27. Heidi Tschank: Die Blaue Venus

=== Schools ===
- Students of the College Neunkirchen: Vernetzung
- Pupils of the primary school Köflach: Planet Erde aus der Sicht der Kinder

=== Dancing and Performance-Groups ===
- "Dancing Planets" „Dancing Planets“ – eine wissenschaftliche und mythologische Reise durch das Sonnensystem / Das Universum, die verschiedenen Planeten – eine Faszination, die niemanden kalt lässt. Erstmals werden in einer multimedialen Tanzperformance Wissenschaft und Mythologie unseres Sonnensystems verbunden. Eine Wissensvermittlung der besonderen Art. Urs Scheifele, Astrophysiker vom Zürcher Planetarium und die Tänzerin Maya Farner nehmen die Zuschauer mit auf eine Reise ins Universum.
- "SlowForward" - conducted by Franz Sramek.
- "Ladies-First-Ladies" BiondekBühne Baden. Choreography: Magdalena Wiesmann
- "SlowForward" - conducted by Franz Sramek.

== Exhibitions and events 2009 ==
- April 4: First event in front of the Kunsthistorisches Museum in Vienna
- April 6–20: Exhibition in and in front of Vienna Planetarium, Kuffner-Observatory, old city-hall of Vienna, in cooperation with the University of Vienna.
- College of Neunkirchen: Students workshop
- Mai 5th - 13th: Gothard Astrophysikalisches Institut der Eötvös Loránd University Hungary in Szombathely. .
- 15.Mai: BiondekBühne Theater- und Tanzwerkstatt, Baden, dance-performance and event in public space.
- Mai 16th - 30th : Exhibition of Rolling Stars and astronomic photography in House of Art, Baden.
- Juni 12th- Juli 5th: Bellabayer - the Gardenatelier, Hartberg, Gardens and art.
- Juli 7th - September 2: Ars Electronica Center in Linz. Stardust – Astronomy and Universe.
- September 3: Opening event of the Ars electronica Festival at the main square of Linz.
- September 19: Festival of culture in Reutte
- September 22–28: Performancein Piber castle, Styria.
- November 27: Festival of illumination St. Veit an der Glan, exhibition in Ernst Fuchs-Palast, „Blumenhalle“ and "Blumenhotel" till January 2010.

=== Events 2010 ===
- April 9 - May 9, 2010 Landesmuseum Joanneum, Künstlerhaus Graz
