= Manfred Kielnhofer =

Austrian sculptor and photographer

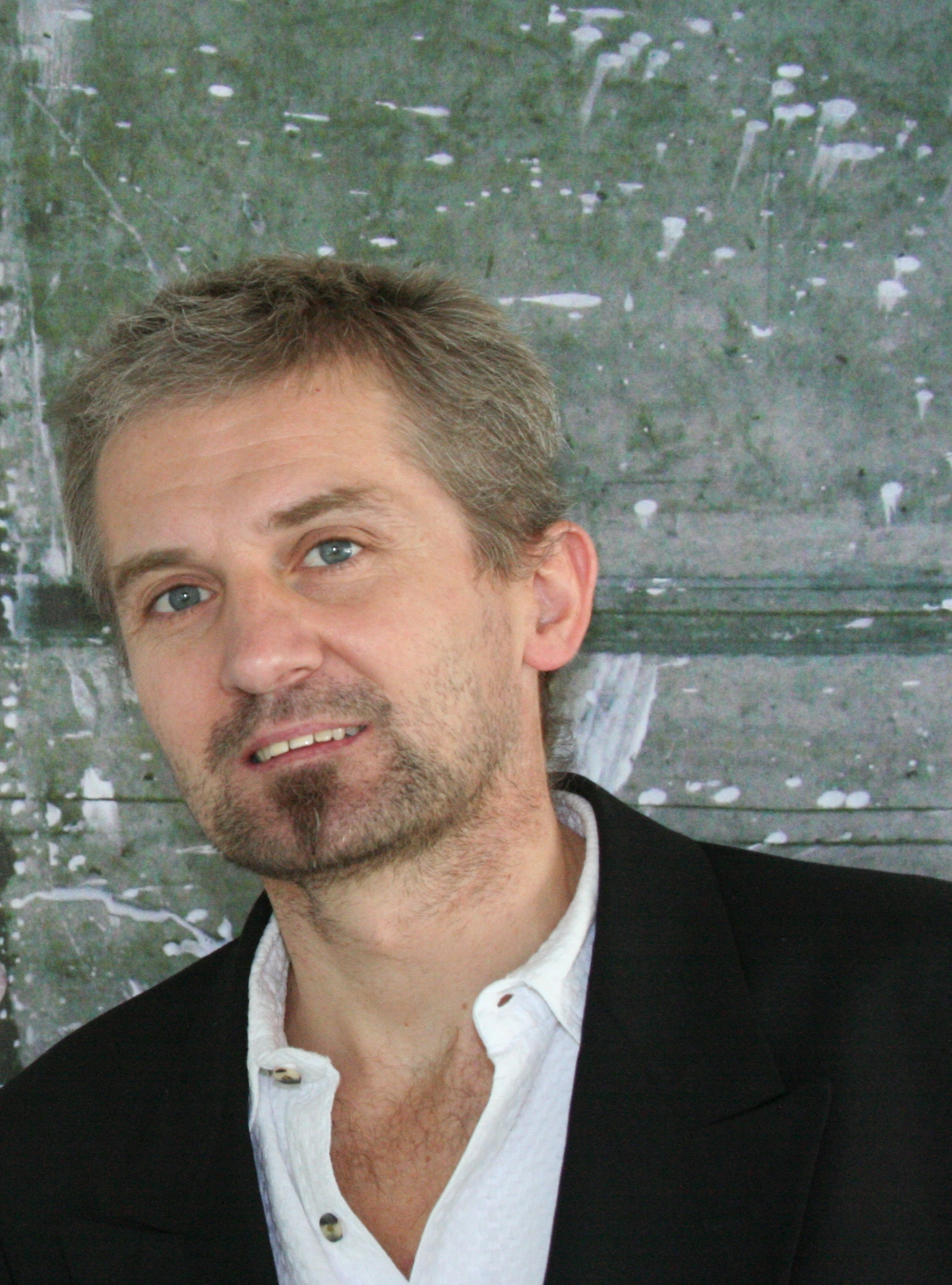
- Manfred Kielnhofer
- Born: 28 January 1967 (age 59); Haslach an der Mühl
- Known for: Painting, photography, design, sculpture
- Notable work: Guardians of Time
- Website: kielnhofer.at

Manfred "KILI" Kielnhofer (born 28 January 1967 in Haslach an der Mühl) is an Austrian painter, sculptor, designer and photographer. Due to his antisemitic statements in connection with the planned vaccination to contain the COVID-19 pandemic, numerous of his works of art were removed from public space.

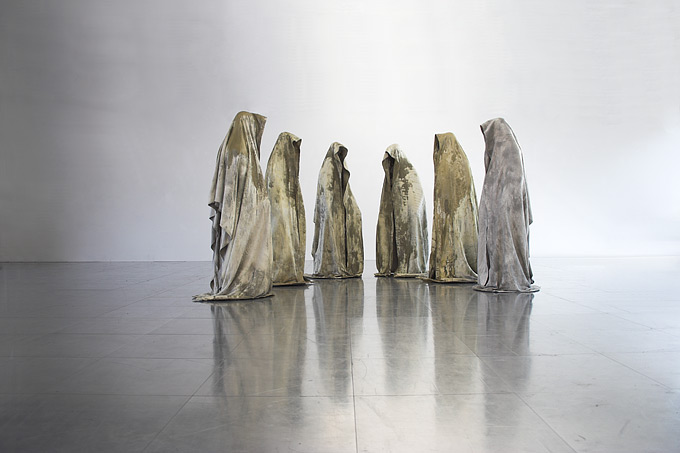
Guardians of Time by Manfred Kielnhofer, Galerie Artpark Linz, 2006

Guardians of Time, Festival of Lights (Berlin), Light art, French Cathedral, Berlin, Velotaxi 2011

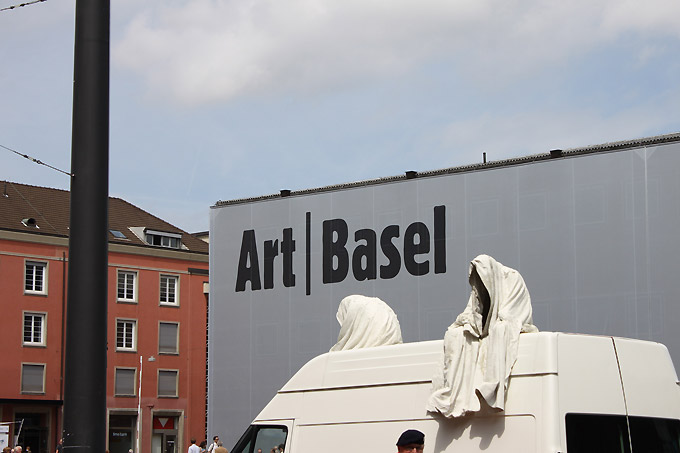
Public Art Project on Tour in Basel, ArtBasel, Design Miami / Basel, Liste, Scope, Volta, 2011

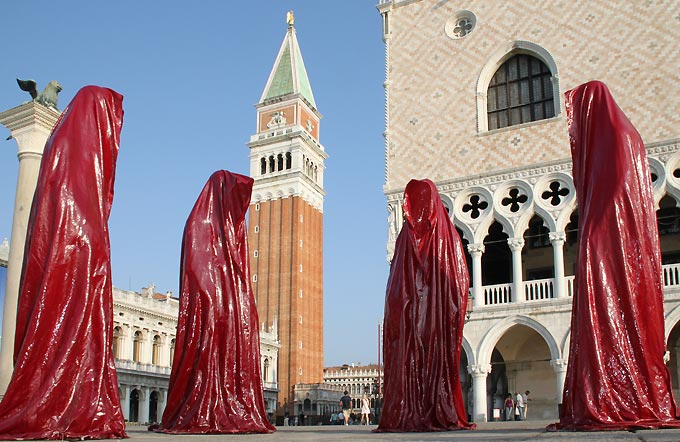
The Street art project "Guardians of Time" on tour in Venice, St. Mark's Square 2011

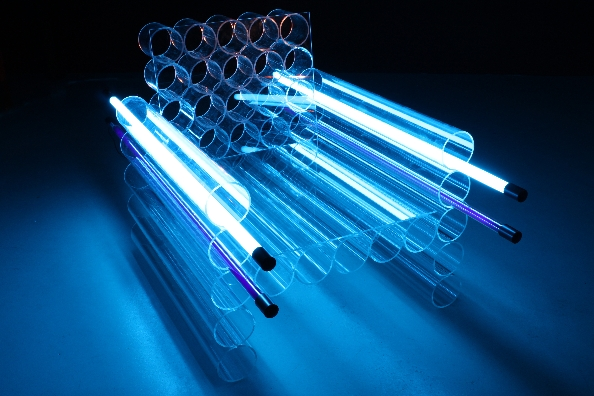
"Interlux-Chair", Lightart-object 2010

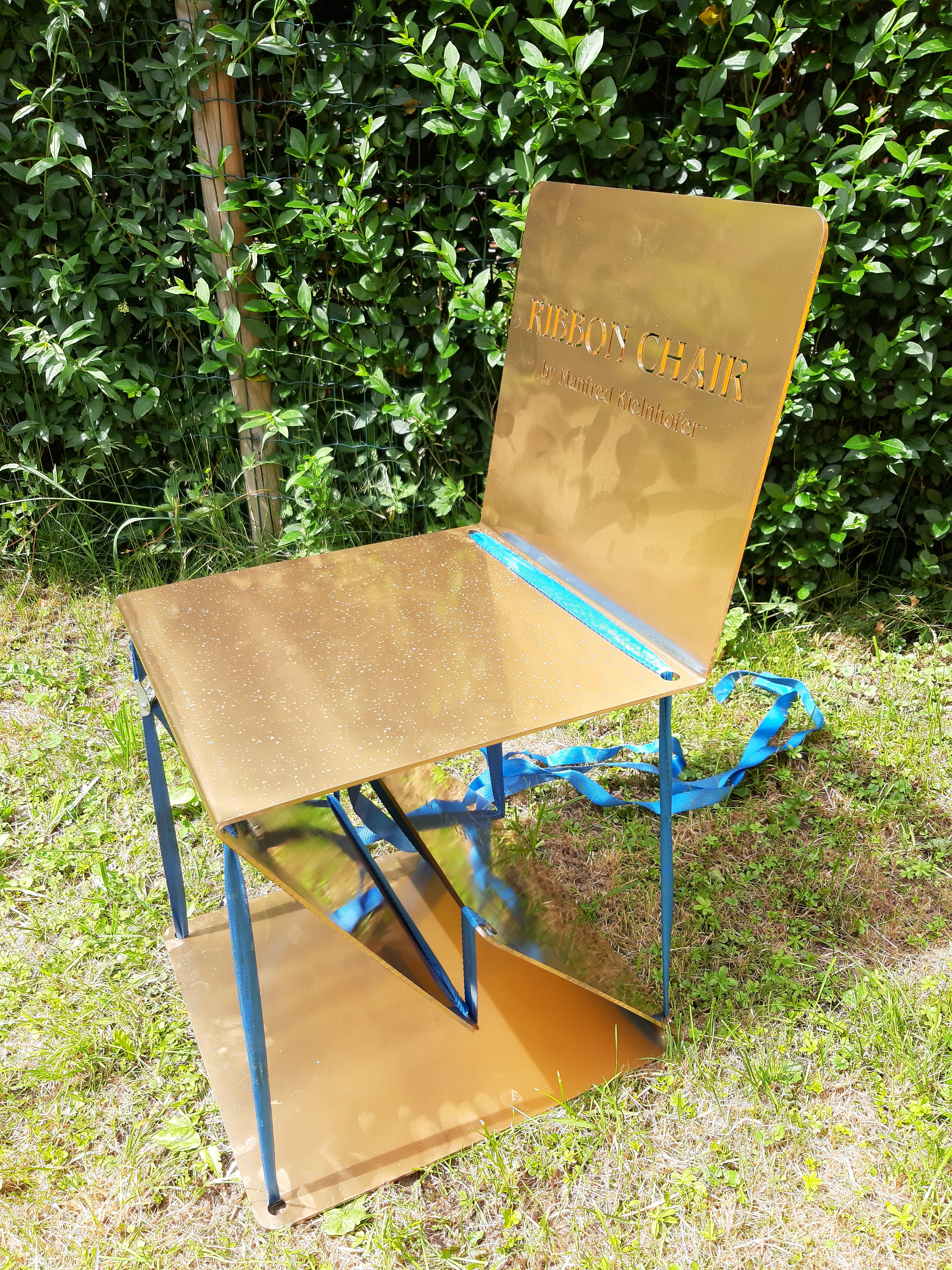
FLOATING TENSEGRITY CHAIR by Manfred Kielnhofer, ARTPARK 2020

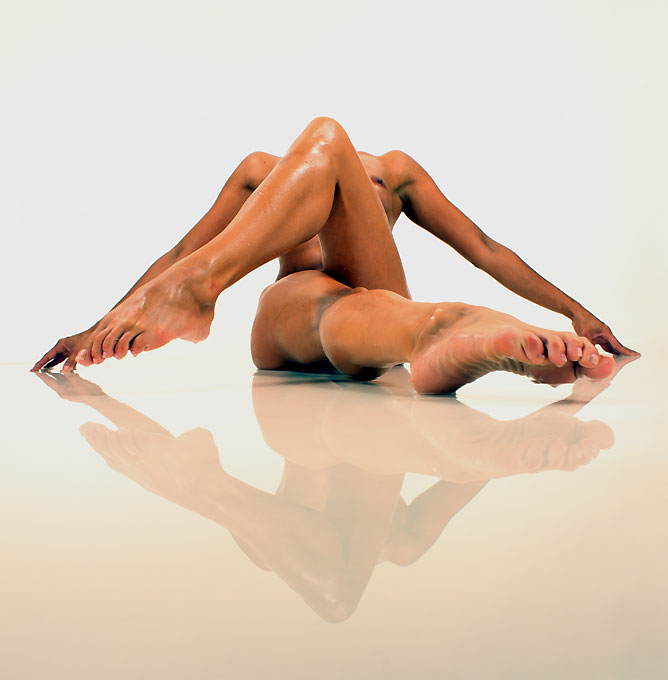
Photographer Kielnhofer: Water reflection, 2009

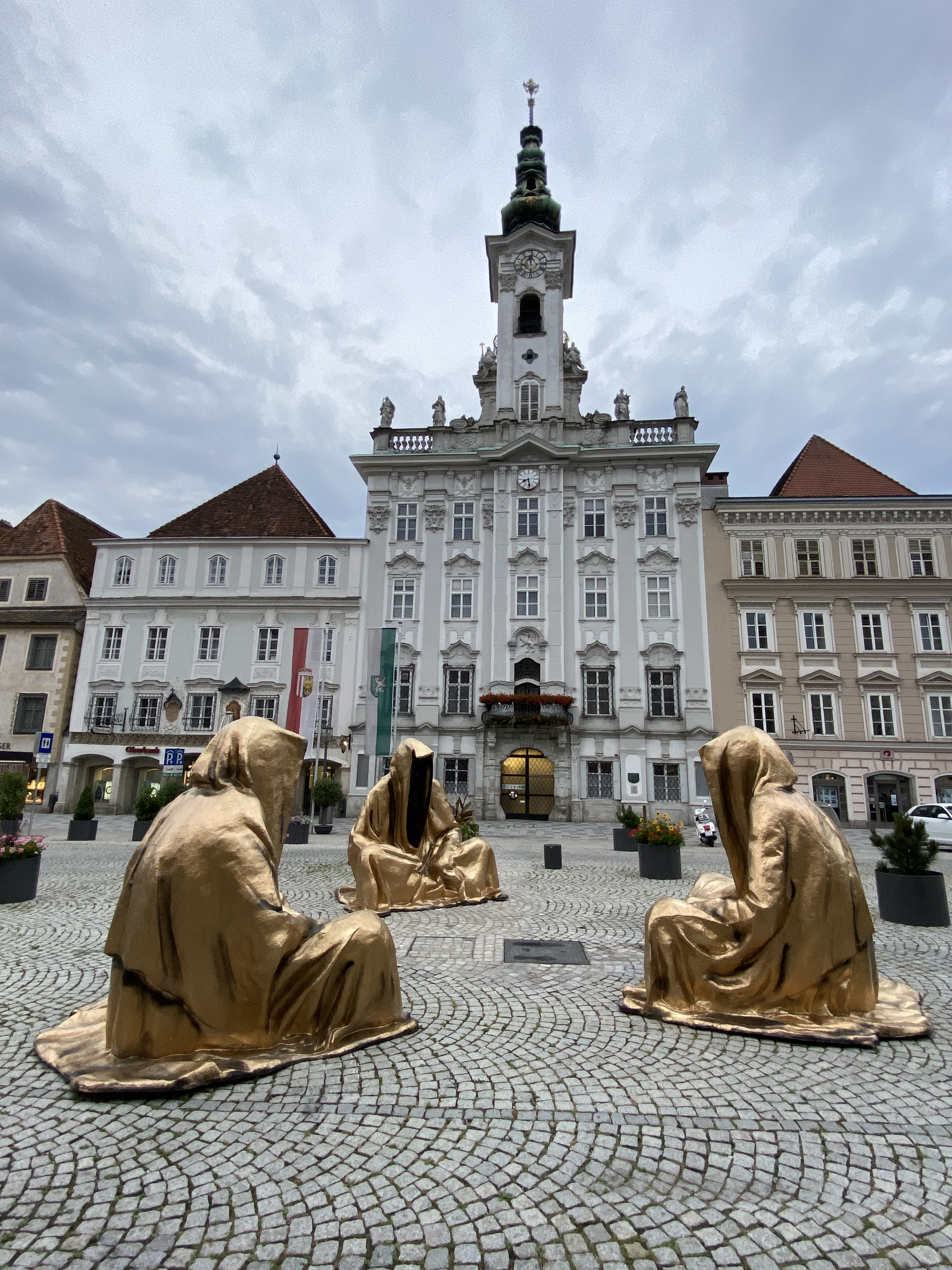
Steyr, ancient giants of the old world 2020

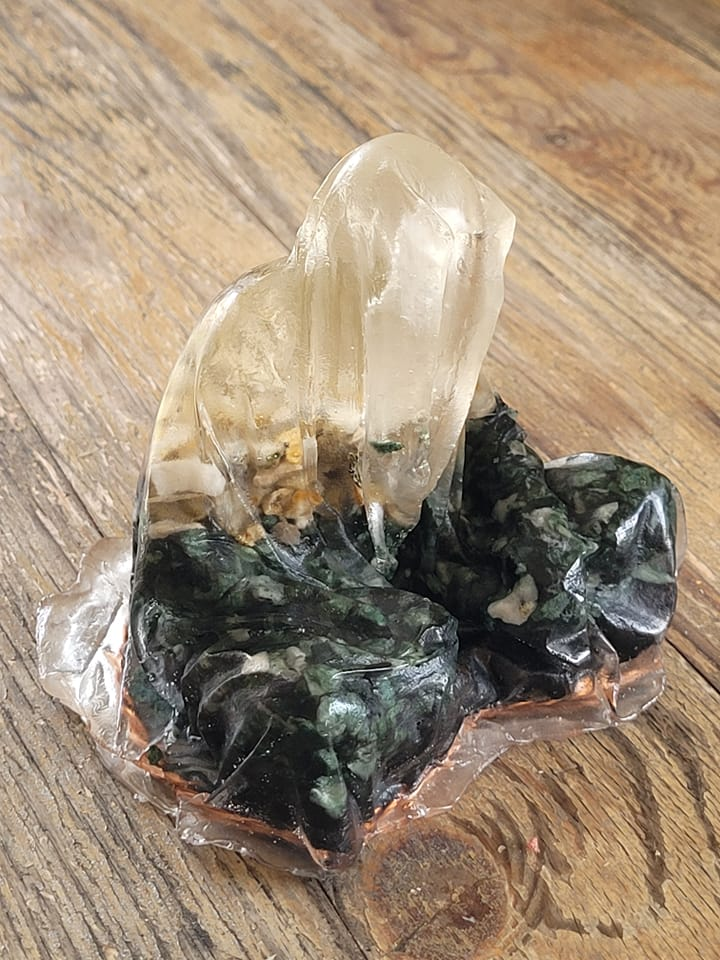
Orgonit, GOT 2023

== Life ==
Manfred "KILI" Kielnhofer attended the technical college in Linz, where he took his final exam in 1995. He was engaged with technique, design, and art on building, which led him to his special way of art. Since 2000, he has lived as a freelance artist in Linz. In 2005, he launched Gallery Artpark in Linz.

== Work ==
Kielnhofer's most famous work is, "Guardians of Time". Drawing on religious and supernatural phenomena, the Guardians of Time are stone statues that are cloaked in hooded robes and situated to seem like they are moving forth in some kind of positive ritual. In some cases the figures stand alone; in other instances, they are grouped together as if whispering to each other. Kielnhofer places his statues in public places like ancient castles, old mines, plazas, and parks. They are installed and moved without fanfare, heightening the eerie, mystic aura they give off. The first of these mysterious figures was created in 2006. Since then, Kielnhofer continues to create and install these statues all over the world. In 2012, the artist created the first of a new series of miniature guardians out of plastic.

In 2009, Kielnhofer developed a new sort of 'act photographs', which involves the construction of a waterplate in his studio, where he can take photos of models sitting or lying down, likely on a mirror. In 2010 he developed the concept of the Light Art Biennale Austria 2010 with Martina Schettina.

The Interlux-Chair, Kielnhofers artwork shown at the biennial, was registered in the design-database of the MAK, the Museum for Applied Arts in Vienna. In 2012 Establishment of the first miniature guardian. The mini guardian, limited edition, 54x36x34cm plastic.

In 2013 the first life-sized Guardian in bronze were cast at the art foundry Krismer. In 2014 the ancient giant people statues 220x220x220cm guardians are shown by the Festival of Lights in Berlin. In 2015 First works with the glass Berengo Studio Murano Venice.

A fine empty coat was made of white Carrara marble by Studio Massimo Galleni in 2016. In 2017 the Bike Guardian rider – time traveler started the tour.

== Stipends ==
- 2000 Studies in USA New York, Miami
- 2005 Stipend of the county of Upper Austria, Studio at the Egon Schiele Art Center Krumlov CZ
- 2007 Symposium – Egon Schiele Art Centrum – Cesky Krumlov 100 years after Egon Schiele
- 2008 Symposium of sculpture on wood in Italy Ossana 2008
- 2012 International symposium of sculpture Styria, Hartberg "Slow!"

== Publications ==
- 2005: in the online database of MAK Museum of Applied Arts (Vienna) Design-Info-Pool-Online
- 2006: Manfred Kielnhofer. Exhibition Catalogue Artpark digitalprint Linz, Gallery ARTpark Lenaupark City Linz.
- 2006: Integrationsweltkugel Artpark ISBN 3-902040-11-4
- 2007: Timeguards Exhibition Catalog digitalprint Linz, Gallery ARTpark Lenaupark City Linz.
- 2008: Masters Contemporary Arts, Collectible Global Art Book ISBN 978-91-89685-18-5
- 2008: Trends Contemporary Arts, Collectible Global Art Book ISBN 978-91-89685-17-8
- 2009: Cass Sculpture Fondation (UK) Manfred Kielnhofer's Timeguards, the Foundation's newest arrivals
- 2011: NordArt, Kunstwerk Carlshütte ISBN 978-3-9813751-2-1
- 2011: LOÖK, Designverständnis eines Bundeslandes ISBN 978-3-200-02461-8
- 2011: Festival of Lights, Berlin Impressionen
- 2011: 500 x Art in Public, Chris van Uffelen, Braun publishing ISBN 978-3-03768-098-8
- 2012: EYES IN – Collector's 9, World's Innovative Creators & their Masterpieces, Cover pp. 51–58. ISBN 978-0985904302
- 2012: Kunstforum Bd. 217 dOCUMENTA (13), Ein Rundgang, pp. 80,81.
- 2012: ST/A/R Printmedium Wien – Berlin, p. 58.
- 2012: Berliner Morgenpost cover page, Festival of Lights
- 2013: ice contemporary istanbul art fair magazine, pp. 41–45.
- 2017: Monopol Magazin, Museumsverwaltung entfernt "Guerrilla Kunst" von Documenta-Standorten
- 2021: Talking Guardians of Time, Journal Verlag, Re-Creation Report by Andreas Weiskopf, Rolo Geisberger, Manfred Kielnhofer

== Press ==
- Catalogue Timeguards Gallery Artpark (PDF-file; 3,14 MB)
- Kielnhofer at Gallery Artpark (PDF-file; 2,10 MB)
- Kielnhofer at Gallery Fontaine (PDF-file; 1,88 MB)
- S/T/A/R arts collection at Gallery Artpark (PDF-file; 1,96 MB)
- story at Austria Journal 8/2008 (PDF-file; 171 kB)
- european-art.net | Manfred Kielnhofer
- ice contemporary istanbul art fair magazine page 41-45
