= Martina Schettina =

Austrian artist (born 1961)

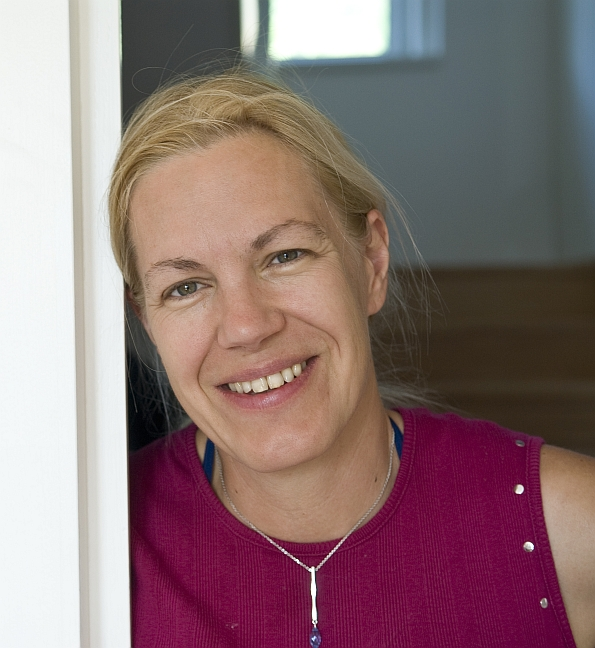
- Martina Schettina in her studio in Langenzersdorf, Austria, photographed by Rene Prohaska, 2008.
- Born: 7 March 1961 (age 65); Vienna
- Known for: Painting
- Website: http://www.schettina.com/

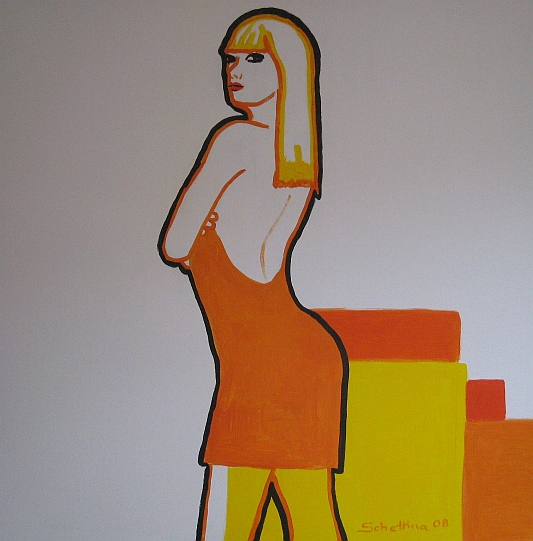
Painting Orange Dress by Martina Schettina

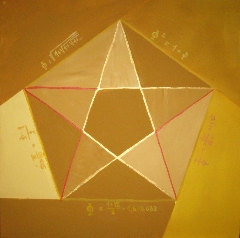
Painting Pentagram by Martina Schettina

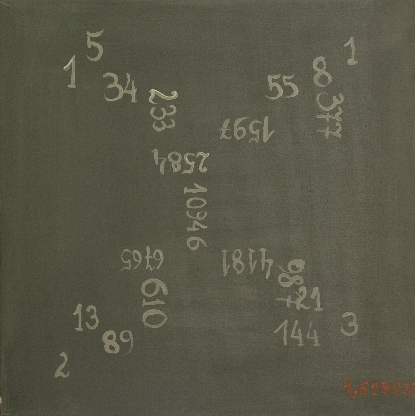
Martina Schettina: Fibonaccis Dream, 2008, 40 x 40 cm

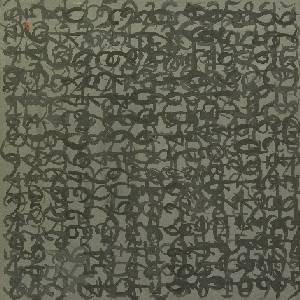
Martina Schettina: Knitted Endlessness, 2008, 50 x 50 cm

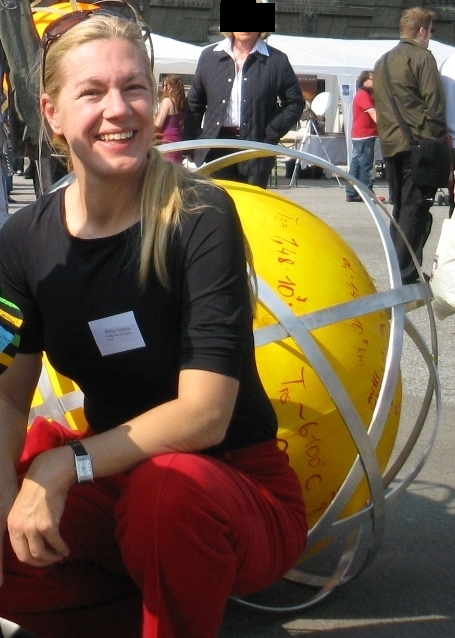
Schettina with her rolling painting "The Sun" in Vienna

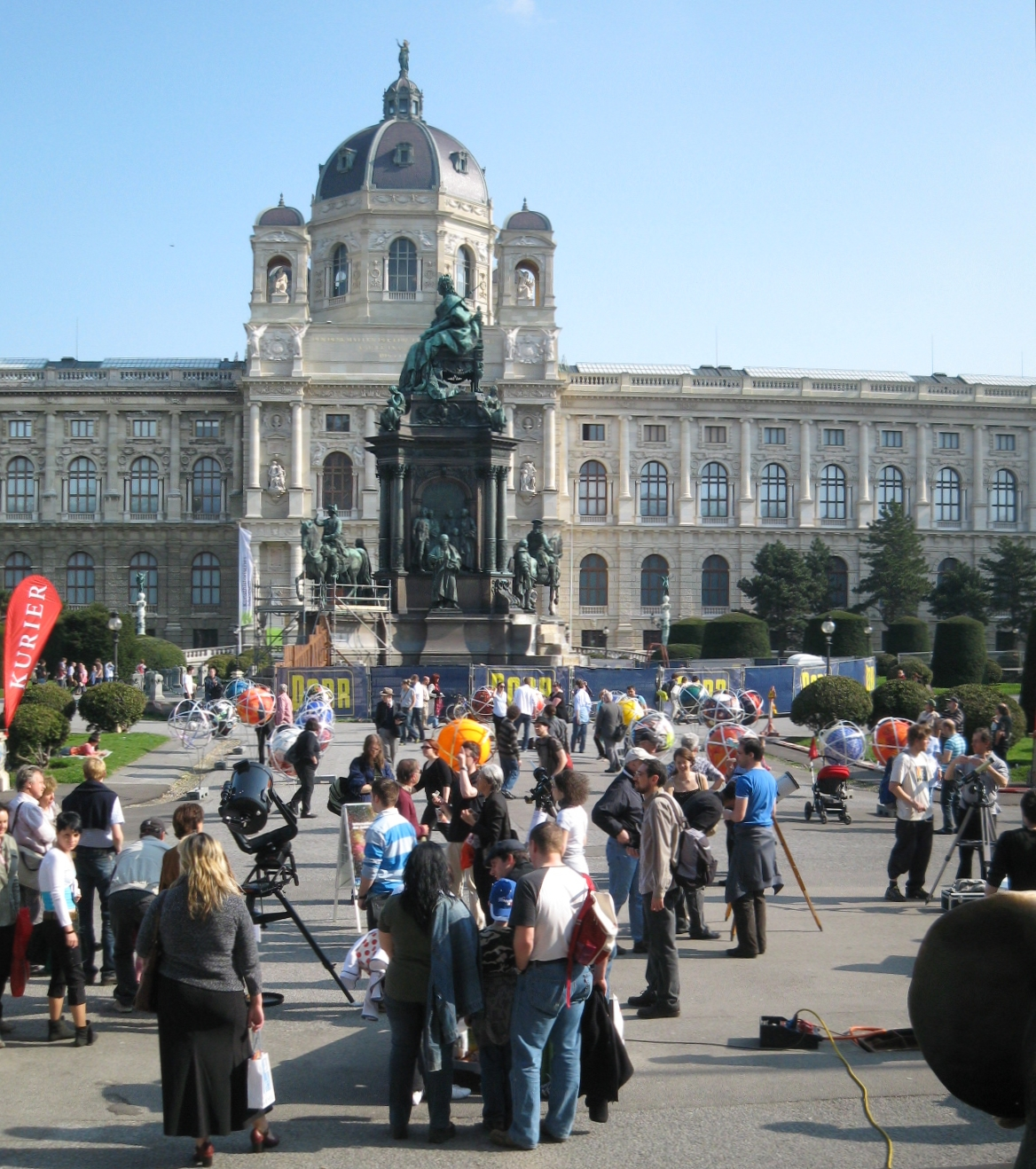
Art performance in Vienna in front of the Kunsthistorisches Museum

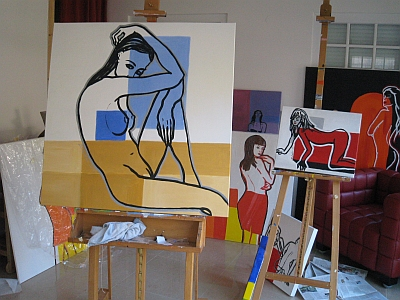
Atelier Martina Schettina

Martina Schettina (born 1961) is an Austrian artist. The main part of her work is Mathematical art.

== Life ==
Martina Schettina was born in 1961 in the district Währing in Vienna. Her father was a mathematician. She spent her childhood in the Viennese district of Leopoldstadt, where she attended a primary school in Parzmanitengasse and the grammar school Bundesrealgymnasium Vereinsgasse, where she passed school leaving examination with honour in 1979.

From 1979 to 1983, Schettina studied mathematics and physics at the University of Vienna and was an autodidact in painting. In 1989 she established her atelier in Langenzersdorf near Vienna and since 1992 has had exhibitions in Europe, the US and Asia.

She studied at the Summer Art school Geras with some famous Austrian painters. These were 1993 Ulrich Gansert, 1994 Peter Sengl and 1995 Hubert Aratym. She also studied at the University of Applied Arts Vienna. In 2007 and 2008 she worked with the Chinese Artist Xiaolan Huangpu. Schettina taught from 1984 to 2007 at a high school in Vienna. Since 2008 her paintings have been periodically published in the newspaper Kronen Zeitung on Sundays. Sometimes her paintings are printed in the newspaper Kleine Zeitung.

Schettina finished teaching in 2007. She works and lives in Langenzersdorf, Lower Austria, and also works in Vienna.

Since 1992 her artworks have been shown in Austrian and international exhibitions. Her first single exhibition outside Austria was in 1999 at the Mots & Tableaux-Gallery in Brussels. Her paintings and sculptures has been shown in many exhibitions in museums and galleries in Europe, the US and Asia and were shown at art fairs such as Art Expo New York City, Art Vilnius, CIGE (China international gallery exposition) in Beijing and at Art Shanghai.

== Work ==
In her narrative and figurative work, Schettina concerns herself with the position of women in the community. She challenges the validation of the role models of men and women in the past and today. Because her bodies seem to be transparent, Schettina is called the painter with the glassy hand. Her work is influenced by Pop-Art. Her painting "Orange Dress", which shows a self-confident, modern woman, was shown on the poster of the 2009 exhibition "City. Country. Woman." in Museum of the City Krems, Austria. From 2008, Schettina has dealt with mathematical themes, which she transforms to paintings. In December 2009 the book Mathemagische Bilder containing paintings and essays was published in Vienna. Schettina also shows performances about mathematics, which are illustrated by her paintings.

- Mathematics- Logic and painting - emotion complete each other in Schettinas work and can be understood as a search for harmony and beauty, as well as a solution for basic questions, in both matters, meant in an all-embracing way.
  — Angelica Bäumer in "Mathemagische Bilder - Bilder und Texte", published by Vernissage Verlag Brod Media, Vienna 2009, ISBN 978-3-200-01743-6, p.52
- Original:
  Mathematik - Logik und Malerei - Emotion ergänzen einander in Schettinas Arbeit und lassen sich verstehen als Suche nach Harmonie und Schönheit, sowie als Lösung von grundsätzlichen Fragen, im einen wie im anderen Metier, jeweils in umfassendem Sinn gemeint.
  — Angelica Bäumer in Martina Schettina: Mathemagische Bilder

== Awards ==
- 1994 Poster contest of the Austrian Ministry of Environment, special prize
- 1998 "The new champions", offspring contest of the Vienna cultural network. (Today Basis.Kultur.Wien)
- 2001 1st prize at ARTforum-contest October 2006
- 2002: registered in Archives on Women Artists of the National Museum of Women in the Arts in Washington DC.
- 2006 gold medal of honour for Science and Art, Austrian Albert Schweitzer Society
- 2009 "artist of the month July 2009" elected by the editorial department of "Kunstforum"

== Single exhibitions ==
- 1994 Malerei. Museum Währing, Wien.
- 2001 Martina SchettinaAnton Hanak-Museum in Langenzersdorf
- 2006 Zweitausendsex in Blaugelbe Vietelsgalerie Castle Fischau, Bad Fischau-Brunn.
- 2007 Magicien à Paris Austrian Cultural Forum Paris
- 2008 Magische Menschen. Magische Orte in Oskar Kokoschka-Museum in Pöchlarn.
- 2008 Magicien à Paris Vol. 2 Austrian Cultural Forum Paris
- 2009 City.Country.Woman in Museum of the city Krems, Krems an der Donau.
- 2010 Mathemagic paintings in the MuseumsquartierVienna
- 2010 Mathematische Bilder, Egon-Schiele-Museum, Tulln
- 2011 Mathemagische Bilder – Von Pythagoras bis Hilbert, Ausstellungsbrücke, St. Pölten
- 2014 Mathematik und die Frauen, Stadtmuseum Minoritenkloster Tulln
- 2015 Mathemagische Bilder, Galerie am Lieglweg, Neulengbach

== Group exhibitions ==
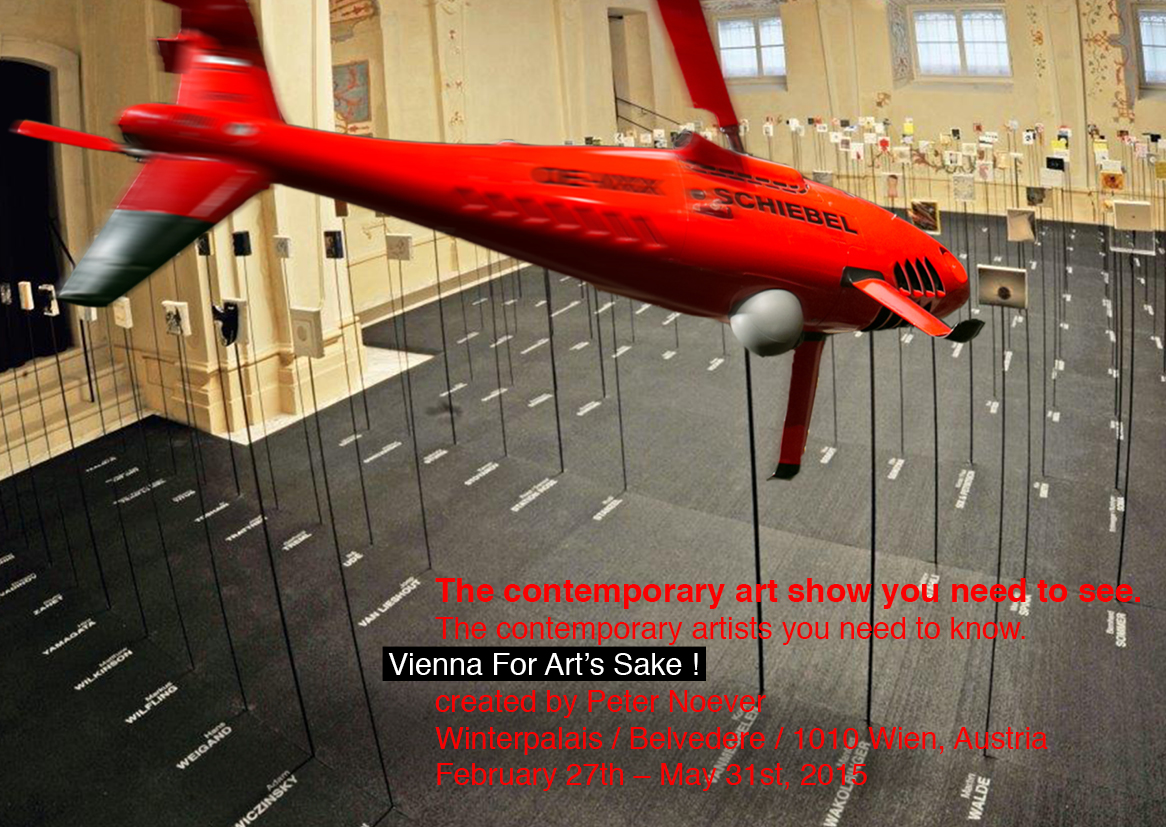
Exhibition at the Winter Palace, Belvedere Wien, 2015 with 161 artists, architects, designers "Vienna For Art's Sake !'" Each painting on a single stick.

- 2003: Florence Biennale
- 2006: Vinspirace Břeclav 2006 im Museum of the city of Břeclav in Czech Republic.
- 2008 Europe and Asia Today in ARTcenter Berlin; curated by Ki-Wong Park, South Korea
- 2009 Rolling Stars and Planets. Performances and exhibition in Vienna in front of the Kunsthistorisches Museum and Szombathely in Hungary responding to the year of Astronomy.
- 2009 Art Vilnius together with Manfred Kielnhofer, Franz West and Herbert Brandl
- 2009 Stardust Ars Electronica Center Linz, Austria.
- 2009 Berlin||Berlin - 20 years after the Fall of the Berlin Wall. Gallery Artodrome, Berlin.
- Light Art Biennale Austria 2010
- 2010 Rolling Stars and Planets in Künstlerhaus Graz
- 2010 Money makes the art go round, Domenig-Haus Vienna.
- 2012 "Weinviertler Künstler im Wienerwald", Wienerwaldmuseum Eichgraben
- 2015 "Vienna for Art's Sake" Winterpalais Prinz Eugen, Vienna. Catalogue.
- 2015 "Map of the New Art. Imago Mundi – Luciano Benetton Collection" Fondazione Giorgio Cini, Venice
- 2016 "The Art of Humanity". Pratt Institute The Rubelle and Norman Schafler Gallery New York

== Performances ==
- 2009 Rolling Stars and Planets. Performances in Vienna and Szombathely in Hungary Year of Astronomy
- 2010 Rolling Stars and Planets. Performance in front of Künstlerhaus Graz.
- 2010 Pythagoras in Delphi. Performance and action teaching as part of "Prophets in residence - Oracle or Determination of the Future" together with Bazon Brock, in German Historical Museum Berlin and at the Karlsruhe University of Arts and Design.
- 2010 Pythagoras in Delphi. Zur Ästhetik der Welteinheit. – Together with Bazon Brock. Hochschule für Gestaltung Karlsruhe.
- 2013 Mathematics and Art. Performance and Slideshow in Planetarium Nürnberg
- 2013 Mathematics and Women. Performance in Gallery Sandpeck Wien 8
- 2013 Performance Theoriedesign der Einsteinformel during the symposium Formwerdung und Formstörung in Denkerei Berlin inspired and curated by Bazon Brock
- 2014 Performance Mathematics and Women, Stadtmuseum Minoritenkloster Tulln im Rahmen der ORF langen Nacht der Museen

== Publications ==
- 1994: Catalogue Schettina
- 2002: Bewegte(s) Leben: Frauenbiografien aus dem Weinviertel by Gabi Lempradl and Hermann Richter, published by Bibliothek der Provinz. One of 14 Women-Biographies ISBN 3-85252-533-0
- 2002: Catalogue: mARTina schettina, Magierbilder 2002 published by Eisl and friends, ISBN 3-9501524-2-3
- 2003 Keine Katze wie Du und ich von Erne Seder, publishing house Langen-Müller-Herbig München; Illustrations and Cover, ISBN 3-7844-2930-0
- 2006: Catalogue zweitausendsechs. published by Eisl and friends, Atelier mARTina schettina Langenzersdorf, 2006,
- 2007: Linz 2007. Exhibition catalogue. Digital print Linz, Gallery ARTpark Lenaupark City Linz.
- 2008: Wein, Weib und Gesang. Poetry. Paintings by Martina Schettina, poems by Michaela Gansterer. published by Michaela Gansterer, Hainburg.
- Art-encyclopedia Deutschland, Österreich, Schweiz 20. edition; No: 207599-2; K. G. Saur Verlag,
- 2009: Martina Schettina: Mathemagische Bilder - Bilder und Texte. Vernissage Edition Brod Media, Vienna 2009, ISBN 978-3-200-01743-6 (in German).
- 2010: Martina Schettina: Mathematische Bilder. Catalogue attending the exhibition in Schiele Museum Tulln. Publisher: Vernissage Verlag Brod Media GmbH Vienna.
- 2012: Martina Schettina: Location BOOK. Genuss, Kultur & Lifestyle: Wiens Grätzl mit Prominenten entdeckt. German: ISBN 978-3-99015-021-4
- 2012: Location Book. Pleasure, Culture & Lifestyle: Discovering Vienna´s Grätzl with prominent guides, English. ISBN 978-3-99015-022-1. Publisher: Bohmann-Verlag 2012.
- 2014 * "Vienna For Art's Sake ! Archive Austria / Contemporary Art. curated by Peter Noever", 161 artists, architects, designers. Publisher: FABRICA, imago mundi, Luciano Benetton Collection, Italy, 2014. 381 pages. ISBN 978-88-98764-06-8

== Collections ==
Works in the private HMZ collection Spielfeld, Austria and the collection Helmut Klewan Munich/Vienna. Sculptures are found in Skulpturenpark Artpark Linz and in the public space of Poysdorf. Artwork by Martina Schettina is also preserved the Museum of Lower Austria, the Weinstadtmuseums Krems, the Hanak-Museum in Langenzersdorf, the Oskar Kokoschka-Museum in Pöchlarn and the collection of the city of Vienna.
