= Festival of Lights (Berlin) =

Annual event in Germany since 2005

Festival of Lights Berlin is a free annual international event that takes place in September to October in Berlin, Germany. It transforms landmarks and buildings across the city through the use of illuminations, luministic projections and 3D mapping. Structures, streets and squares, including Brandenburg Gate, the Berlin TV Tower, the Berlin Cathedral, or the Berlin Victory Column have been metamorphosed through light each year since the first Festival of Lights took place in 2005.

In 2008, the Light Festival opened on 14 October with the light fountain show Flames of Water in front of Humboldt University of Berlin in Berlin. The light artists lit up and cast projections across 49 landmarks and squares across Berlin. The church towers of the Nikolaikirche in the city centre were for the first time ever illuminated all in white, commemorating the legend of the escape of John Sigismund, Elector of Brandenburg from his castle to the Nikolai quarter in the 17th century.

A light clock on the Marx-Engels Forum with a diameter of 60 meters found its way into the Guinness World Records as the largest in the world. For joggers there was a ‘light run’ on a 7.5 km-long track bordered on either side by an array of illuminated buildings. A multitude of museums, theaters, embassies and companies opened their doors on this night and invited people in for light-oriented presentations.

Each Festival of Lights has its own motto. In the program highlight "World Championship of Projection Mapping", the best video artists from all over the world skilfully present their visions in 3D video mappings each year. This was also the case in 2017 under the motto "Creating Tomorrow" at the Berlin Cathedral. One of the highlights of the 13th Festival Of Lights was the special "Democracy" award, in which video artists from all over the world took part. Their works were shown at Bellevue Castle, with the award ceremony being opened by Federal President Frank Walter Steinmeier. There was also the first 360° production at Bebelplatz with a 3D video mapping for the 275th anniversary of the Berlin State Opera. Also for the first time there was a 3D video mapping on the Old Town House, which was opened by Oscar winner Julianne Moore. The 13th Festival of Lights (in 2017) was seen by 2.3 million visitors. Festival of Lights On Tour projects have already taken place in New York, Toronto, Luxembourg, Bucharest, Zagreb, Moscow, Beijing, Zwickau and Jerusalem.

The event is a registered trademark, and the creative director is Birgit Zander of Zander & Partner.

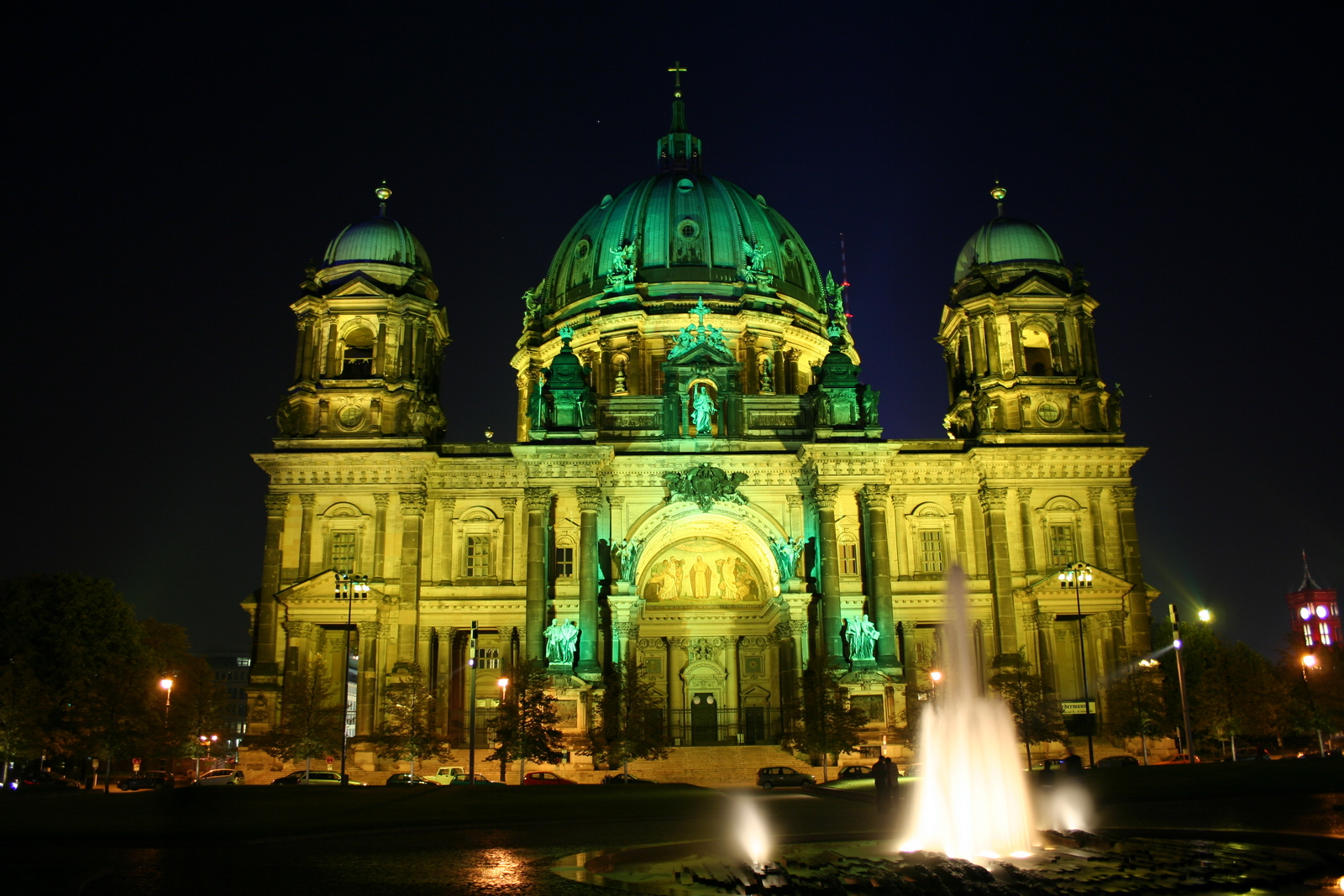
Berliner Dom during Festival of Lights

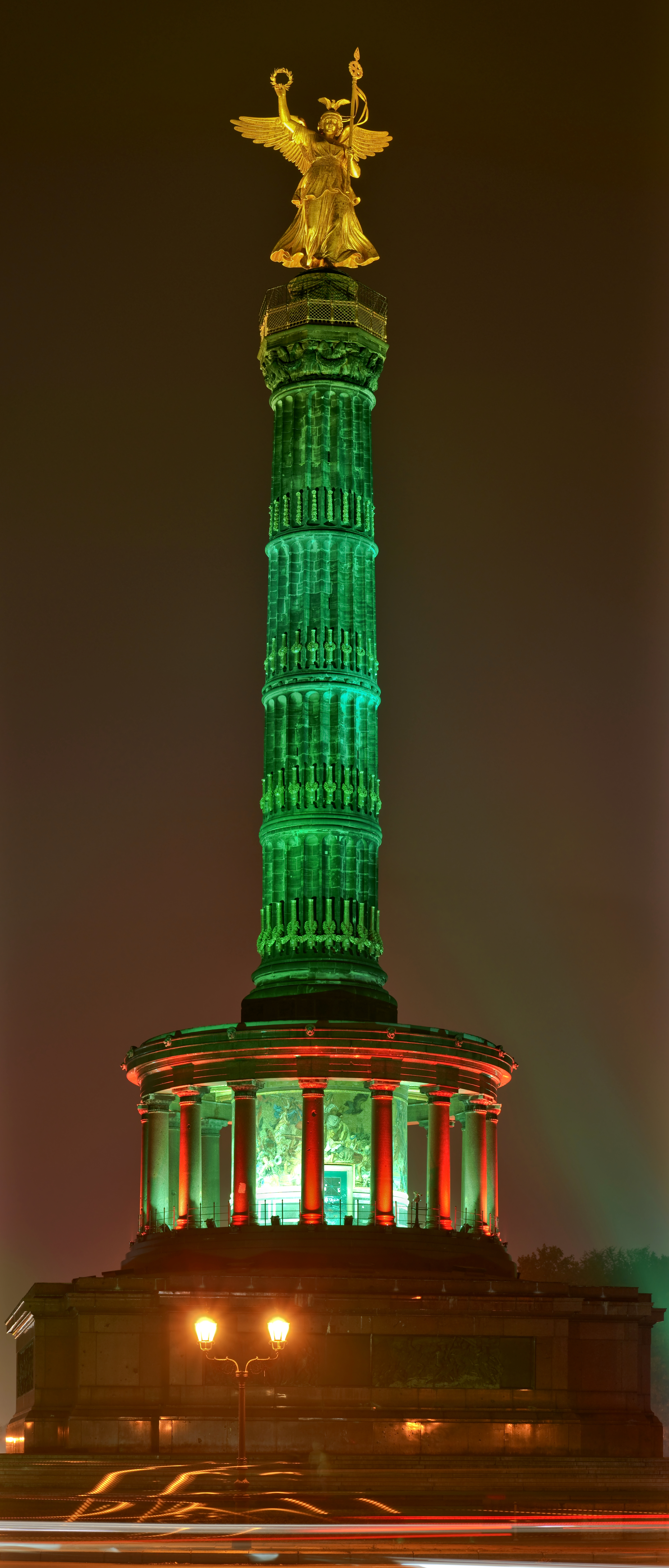
Berlin Victory Column during Festival of Lights 2009

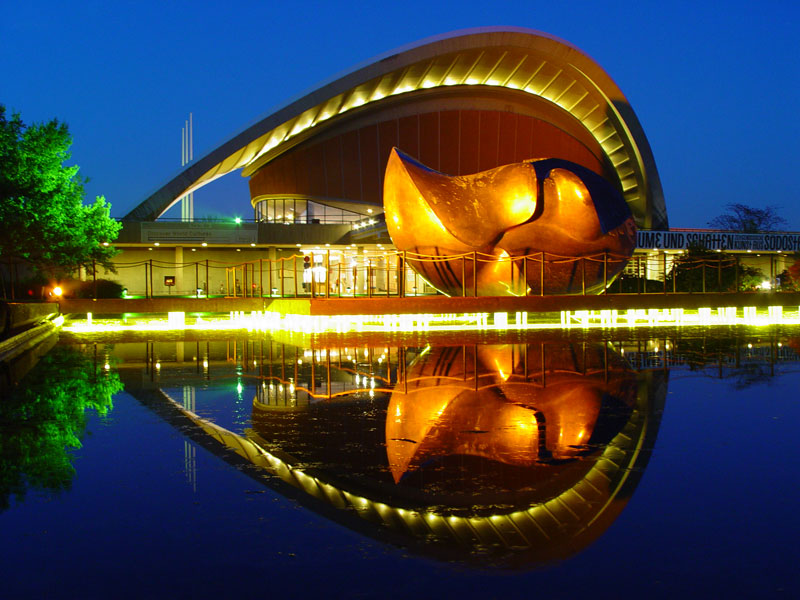
Haus der Kulturen der Welt 2005
