= Ovchinnikov =

Ovchinnikov (Russian: Овчинников) (feminine: Ovchinnikova) is a Russian surname. Notable people with the surname include:

- Andrei Aleksandrovich Ovchinnikov (b. 1986), Russian footballer
- Irina Aleksandrovna Ovchinnikova (1904–1990), White Russian émigré and eventual wife of Prince Peter of Greece and Denmark
- Mikhail Pavlovich Ovchinnikov (1884–1921), Russian revolutionary and archeologist
- Nikolai Ovchinnikov (1918–2004), Soviet painter
- Pavel Vladimirovich Ovchinnikov (b. 1998), Russian football player
- Sergei Ovchinnikov (disambiguation), multiple people
- Vladimir Ovchinnikov (disambiguation), multiple people
- Vsevolod Ovchinnikov (1926–2021), Soviet journalist and author
- Vyacheslav Ovchinnikov (1936–2019), Soviet composer
- Yuri Ovchinnikov (biochemist) (1934–1988), Soviet bioorganic chemist
- Yuri Ovchinnikov (figure skater) (born 1950), Russian figure skater
