= Monégasque Revolution =

1910 popular rebellion against the absolute rule of Prince Albert I of Monaco

- Date: 16 March 1910 – 5 January 1911
- Location: Monaco
- Caused by: High unemployment; Poor international reputation; French domination of the Monégasque government and economy
- Goals: Transition to a constitutional monarchy, or a republic if the Prince failed to comply; Election of the Communal Council by universal suffrage; Freedom of the press and freedom of assembly; Termination of the gaming monopoly of Camille Blanc and Roland Bonaparte over the SBM; Removal of French citizens from state offices; Separation of state and princely finances
- Result: Concessions given to protesters: Monaco transitions from absolute monarchy to semi-constitutional monarchy; Treasury of Monaco is established; Constitution of Monaco promulgated 5 January 1911

Parties
Government of Monaco	(Monaco) Protesters

Lead figures
Albert I	Suffren Reymond; Théodore Gastaud

Units involved
Compagnie des Carabiniers du Prince	

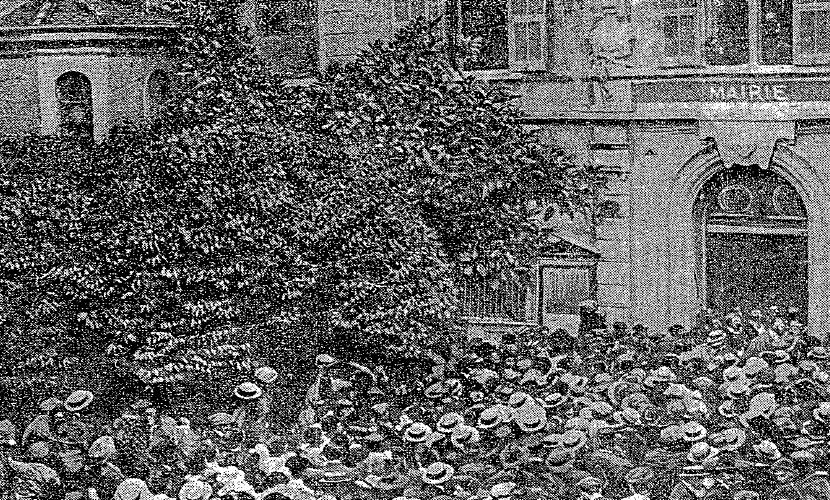
The Mayor of Monaco announces Prince Albert I's concessions to the people.

The Monégasque Revolution (French: révolution monégasque) was a series of confrontations by the subjects of Monaco against their ruler, Prince Albert I. It led to the end of absolute monarchy with the promulgation of the Constitution of Monaco the following year.

== Popular demands ==
The subjects had several grievances against the prince. There was severe unemployment as the country lacked farmlands or factories and the gaming establishment banned the hiring of the prince's subjects. Their national pride was hampered by a poor reputation as "the moral cesspool of Europe". In addition, the prince spent his money in France rather than at home. They had a list of demands that included establishing a Parliament, Treasury, and Constitution, and effectively ending the absolute monarchy of Prince Albert. Other demands included the termination of Camille Blanc and Roland Bonaparte's monopoly over the gaming establishment, the removal of French citizens from state offices, and the separation of the prince's finances from the state's.

== Revolution ==
In early March 1910, Prince Albert received this list of demands. On the 28th, the prince made his first concession. He agreed to the formation of a Parliament (called the National Council) elected through universal suffrage. While a monumental win for the people of Monaco, many of their demands had not been answered. For the rest of the year, there were protests against French domination of Monaco's government and economy. While the revolution does not have any commonly mentioned leaders, Suffren Reymond and Théodore Gastaud are credited as key figures during this period of time.

Later on in the year (early October), the people made their opinions known. They stormed the Prince's Palace in a mass protest. It is unclear whether the protest turned violent, but the lack of police force means the local security was quickly overwhelmed. Prince Albert announced on October 15 that he will be establishing a national treasury. Just 4 days later, Prince Albert announced the creation of an official constitution for Monaco.

With a National Council, Treasury, and Constitution, the people turned to the issue of gambling. To them, the gambling syndicate in Monaco was a stain on the country's reputation. The people started advocating for the contract between the state and the company that ran the casinos, Société des Bains de Mer de Monaco (SBM), to be terminated. The main shareholders in SBM—Camille Blanc, Constantine Radziwill, and Roland Bonaparte—were concerned over the growing negative sentiment around their business and the introduction of a new Constitution. They feared legislation that would negatively impact their casino profits. Ultimately, Prince Albert continued forward with the Constitution without their support.

The Revolution was considered over in January 1911, after the passing of the new Constitution.

== Post-Revolution ==
Overall, the revolutionaries met their main goals, but not all of their smaller points. They established a Constitution, Treasury, and National Council. They were unsuccessful in shutting down the casinos in Monaco, and SBM still operates there today. Furthermore, the ties to the French government only got stronger with time, as the Prince signed a treaty with France in 1918 to secure an alliance and military protection.

On 5 January 1911, a new constitution was passed. Later that year, the National Council held its first session. Nevertheless, Prince Albert I still wielded considerable power and suspended the constitution during World War I. After Prince Albert I's death in 1922, The New York Times published a 1921 interview with him on the process and his views on the need for the 1911 revolution.

== See also ==
- Albert I, Prince of Monaco#Later life
- Camille Blanc#Persona non grata in Monaco
