= Andrei Ovchinnikov =

Andrei Ovchinnikov may refer to:

- Andrei Aleksandrovich Ovchinnikov (b. 1986), Russian footballer
- Andrei Ovchinnikov (cossack) (1739-1774), Cossack and close associate of Yemelyan Pugachev; see Battle of Kazan (1774)
