= Marie-Félix Blanc =

French princess (1859–1882)

Marie-Félix Bonaparte
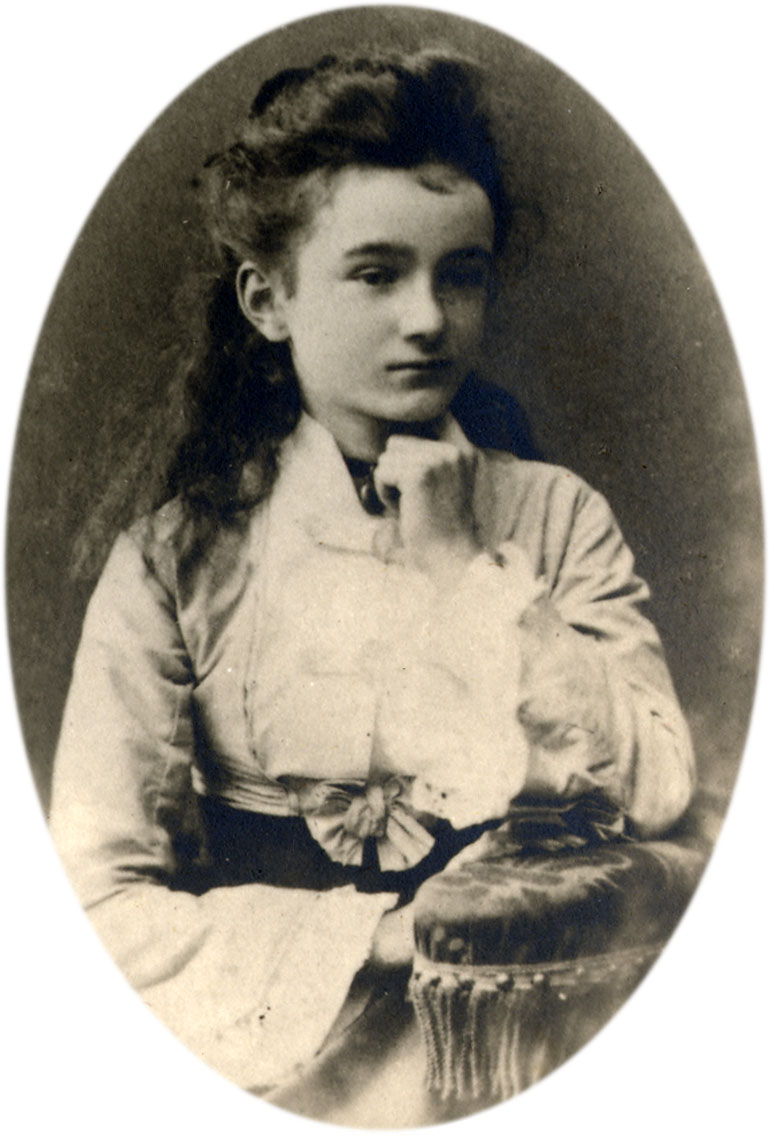
- c. 1872
- Born: Marie-Félix Blanc; 22 December 1859; Paris, Second French Empire
- Died: 1 August 1882 (aged 22); Saint-Cloud, French Third Republic
- Burial: Cimetière des Gonards
- Spouse: Prince Roland Bonaparte (m. 1880)
- Issue: Marie, Princess George of Greece and Denmark
- House: Bonaparte (by marriage)
- Father: François Blanc
- Mother: Marie Charlotte Hensel

Princess Marie-Félix Bonaparte (née Marie-Félix Blanc; 22 December 1859 – 1 August 1882) was a French heiress. Born into a wealthy French bourgeoisie family with financial holdings in Monaco and Germany, she was left with a large inheritance after her father's death. Despite her mother's objections, in 1880, she married Prince Roland Bonaparte, a member of a morganatic branch of the House of Bonaparte. She died from an embolism a month after giving birth to her only child, Princess Marie Bonaparte.

== Early life and family ==
Marie-Félix Blanc was born on 22 December 1859 in Paris to French businessman François Blanc and his second wife, Marie Charlotte Hensel. Her father was the founder of the Société des bains de mer de Monaco and operated multiple casinos, including the Casino de Monte-Carlo in Monaco and the Bad Homburg vor der Höhe Casino in Germany. Her godfather, Count Antoine Bertora, was rumored to be her biological father. She had an older sister, Louise; an older brother, Edmond; and two older half-brothers from her father's first marriage to Madeleine-Victoire Huguelin, Camille and Charles. Her older sister later married Prince Constantine Wincenty Maria Radziwiłł. Her older brother later served as the mayor of La Celle-Saint-Cloud, and her older half brother, Camille, served as mayor of Beausoleil. When she was 18 years old, Blanc's father died, leaving her a vast inheritance.

== Marriage and issue ==
On 18 November 1880, Blanc married Prince Roland Bonaparte at the Church of Saint-Roch in Paris, despite her mother's opposition. Her husband was the son of Prince Pierre-Napoléon Bonaparte and Éléonore-Justine Ruflin, and he was a grandson of Lucien Bonaparte, 1st Prince of Canino and Musignano and Alexandrine de Bleschamp. Her husband was also the grand-nephew of Emperor Napoleon I of France; King Jérôme I of Westphalia; King Joseph I of Spain, Naples and Sicily; King Louis I of Holland; Queen Caroline of Naples; Grand Duchess Elisa of Tuscany, Princess of Lucca and Piombino; and Duchess Pauline of Guastalla. Her mother-in-law, Princess Pierre Bonaparte, reportedly held the Blanc family in low regard, but supported the marriage due to Marie-Félix's large dowry, which included 8,400,000 francs worth of assets and a reversionary right to a 6,000,000 franc trust which her mother held a life-interest in.

Blanc gave birth to her only child, Princess Marie Bonaparte, on 2 July 1882 in Saint-Cloud. Her daughter married Prince George of Greece and Denmark in 1907 and had two children, Prince Peter and Princess Eugénie.

== Death ==
Blanc's health later declined as she suffered from tuberculosis. On 1 August 1882, she died from an embolism. Blanc's death was seven years before her husband succeeded his cousin, Napoléon Charles Bonaparte, as the 6th Prince of Canino and Musignano. She was buried in the Cimetière des Gonards in Versailles, Yvelines.
