= Prince Peter of Greece and Denmark =

Greek prince (1908–1980)

Prince Peter
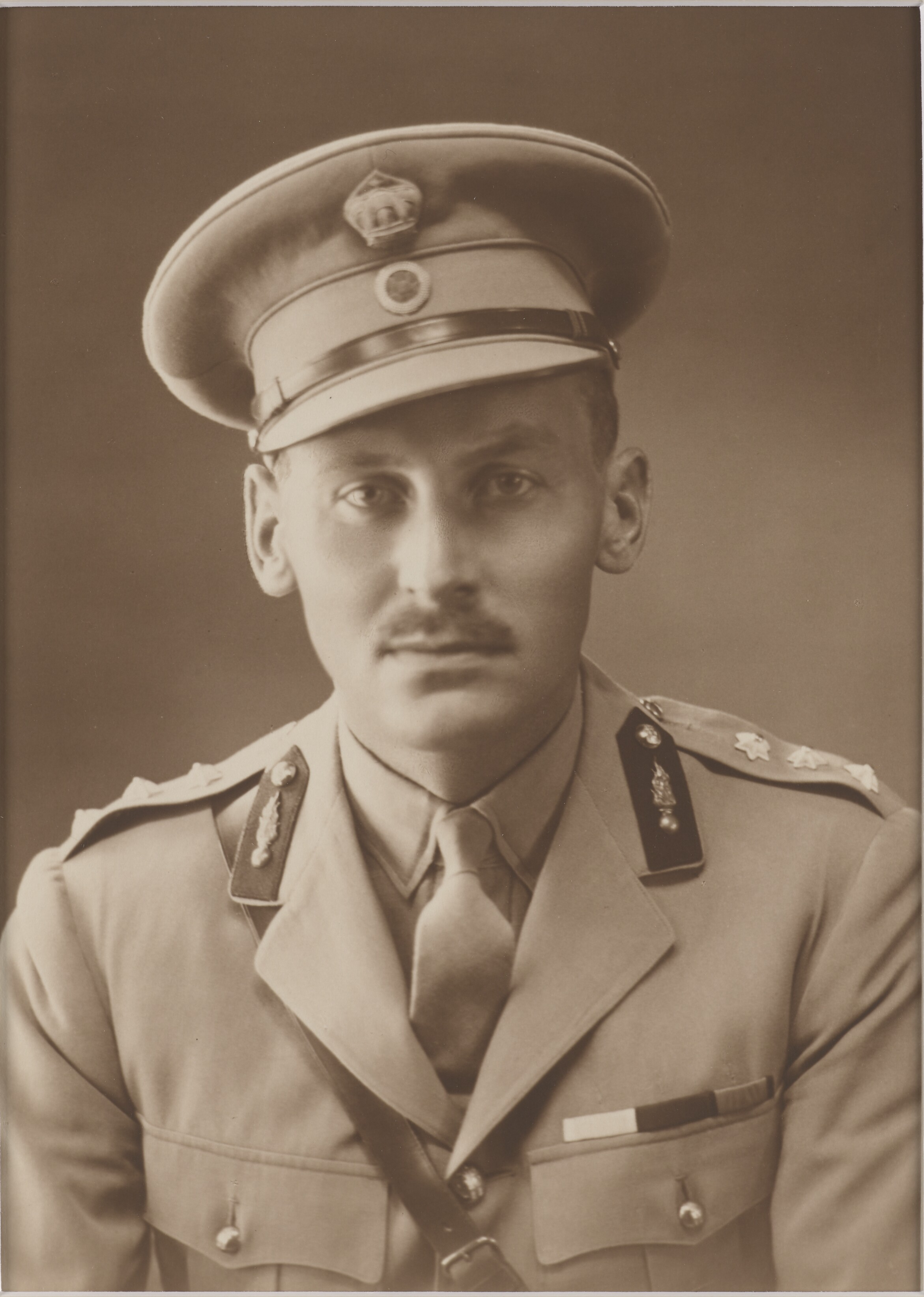
- Prince Peter c. 1940
- Born: 3 December 1908; Paris, France
- Died: 15 October 1980 (aged 71); London, England
- Burial: 5 September 1981; Lille Bernstorff, Denmark
- Spouse: Irina Aleksandrovna Ovtchinnikova (m. 1939)
- House: Glücksburg
- Father: Prince George of Greece and Denmark
- Mother: Marie Bonaparte
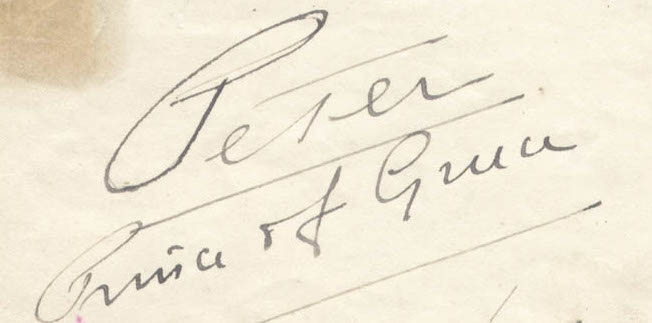
- Signature

Prince Peter of Greece and Denmark (Greek: Πέτρος; 3 December 1908 – 15 October 1980) was a Greek prince, soldier and anthropologist specialising in Tibetan culture and polyandry. Born in Paris and high in the line of succession to the Greek throne, Prince Peter was deemed to have forfeited his succession rights by marrying a twice-divorced Russian commoner, Irina Aleksandrovna Ovtchinnikova. Following his first scientific voyage to Asia, Peter served as an officer of the Greek army during the Second World War. The Prince returned to Asia several more times for his research of Tibetan culture. He strongly protested against the royal family's treatment of his wife. After King Paul's death, he declared himself heir presumptive to the Greek throne, on the pretext that female dynasts had been unlawfully granted succession rights in 1952. Peter eventually separated from his wife and died childless in London.

== Early life ==
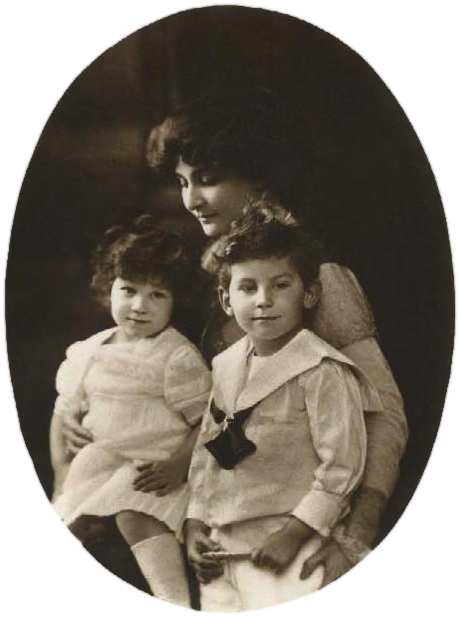
Princess George with Prince Peter and Princess Eugénie of Greece and Denmark

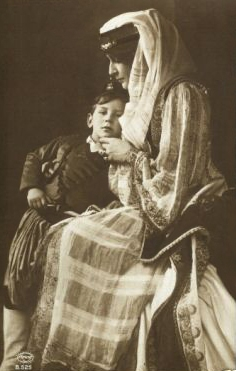
Princess George and Prince Peter in traditional Greek costume

A member of the House of Schleswig-Holstein-Sonderburg-Glücksburg, Prince Peter was the elder child and only son of Prince George of Greece and Denmark and the wealthy author and psychoanalyst Princess Marie Bonaparte. His father was the second son of King George I of Greece and his mother the only daughter of the French botanist Prince Roland Bonaparte and Marie-Félix Blanc.

Peter was born in Paris and spent his childhood in France, and did not set foot in Greece between 1912 and 1935 due to the First World War and the later proclamation of the Second Hellenic Republic. During that time, he came to know Denmark, the kingdom from which the Greek royal family originated. He joined the Royal Guards of Denmark in 1932 for basic military service, and was commissioned as a second lieutenant in 1934. He spent summers at Bernstorff Palace, then owned by his paternal granduncle, Prince Valdemar of Denmark. Due to their father's long-lasting sexual and emotional relationship with his uncle Valdemar, Peter and his sister Eugénie referred to Valdemar as "Papa Two". As customary, Princess George took no part in her son's upbringing, and when he reached adolescence, only the counsels of the psychoanalyst Sigmund Freud helped them suppress their incestuous feelings for each other.

=== Greek restoration ===
Following the restoration of his cousin, King George II, Prince Peter travelled to the Kingdom to take part in the ceremonial reinterment of the remains of his uncle, King Constantine I, and those of the queens Olga and Sophia, his grandmother and aunt respectively. He was then third in the line of succession, preceded only by his unmarried cousin Paul and his own father, and thus an important member of the royal family. In the 1930s, a possible marriage between Prince Peter and Princess Frederica of Hanover may have been discussed, but she eventually married Prince Paul.

=== Education ===
Peter attended Lycée Janson de Sailly and received the degree of Doctor of Law from the University of Paris. He studied anthropology from 1935 until 1936 at the London School of Economics under the Polish-born anthropologist Bronisław Malinowski and the New Zealander ethnologist Sir Raymond Firth. Peter joined the 3/40 Evzone Regiment in 1936, becoming an officer. He proceeded to travel through Greece with his parents and visited Crete in April 1937.

== Voyage to Asia and marriage ==
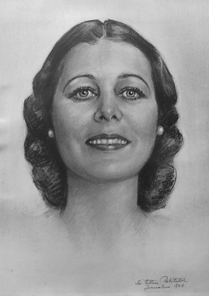
Portrait of Prince Peter's wife: Irina Aleksandrovna Ovtchinnikova

In 1935, Prince Peter met and started a relationship with Irina Aleksandrovna Ovtchinnikova, a four years older married Russian émigré with an ex-husband, Jehan de Monléon, Marquis de Monléon. The next year, she obtained divorce from her second husband Lewis (Slodon) Sloden, and her influence over Peter steadily increased. His family strongly disapproved of his relationship with "the Russian", as they dubbed Ovtchinnikova. Peter himself did not want to gain a reputation as bad as that of King Edward VIII of the United Kingdom, who abdicated the same year to marry his own twice divorced foreign lover, the American Wallis Simpson.

Accompanied by Ovtchinnikova and a student of Malinowski, Prince Peter embarked on a voyage to Asia in September 1937. The party passed through Syria and Persia before reaching British India, in search of a tribe that Peter could study. They arrived in what is now Pakistan in early 1938, and Peter conducted research in the regions of Lahore, Kulu, Leh, and Srinagar. In Kagil he visited the tomb of the Danish traveller Polycarpus Lindqvist that died there in 1930 by adding an inscription.

Wishing to avoid the Himalayan winter, they moved to South India and spent time with the Toda people. They visited the Nilgiris district, Madras, Kalimpong and finally Ceylon. Throughout the entire journey, Peter focused his attention on the study of polyandry – an interest that may have resulted from the Oedipus complex.

While in Madras, Peter decided to officialise his relationship with Ovtchinnikova. The pair were married in a Danish consulate in September 1939. Aware of his family's disapproval of the relationship, but also possibly wishing to take advantage of the turmoil created by the recently declared Second World War, the Prince did not bother to inform either the Greek royal court or his parents about the marriage. The royal family learned of the mesalliance through the press a few weeks later. Prince George, affronted by his son's decision not to ask him or the King for permission to marry, disowned Peter and henceforward refused contact with him. Despite her own disappointment, however, Princess George remained in touch with her son and continued to regularly send him money.

However, not all members of the royal family were dissatisfied with Peter's mesalliance and subsequent loss of dynastic rights.

== Second World War ==
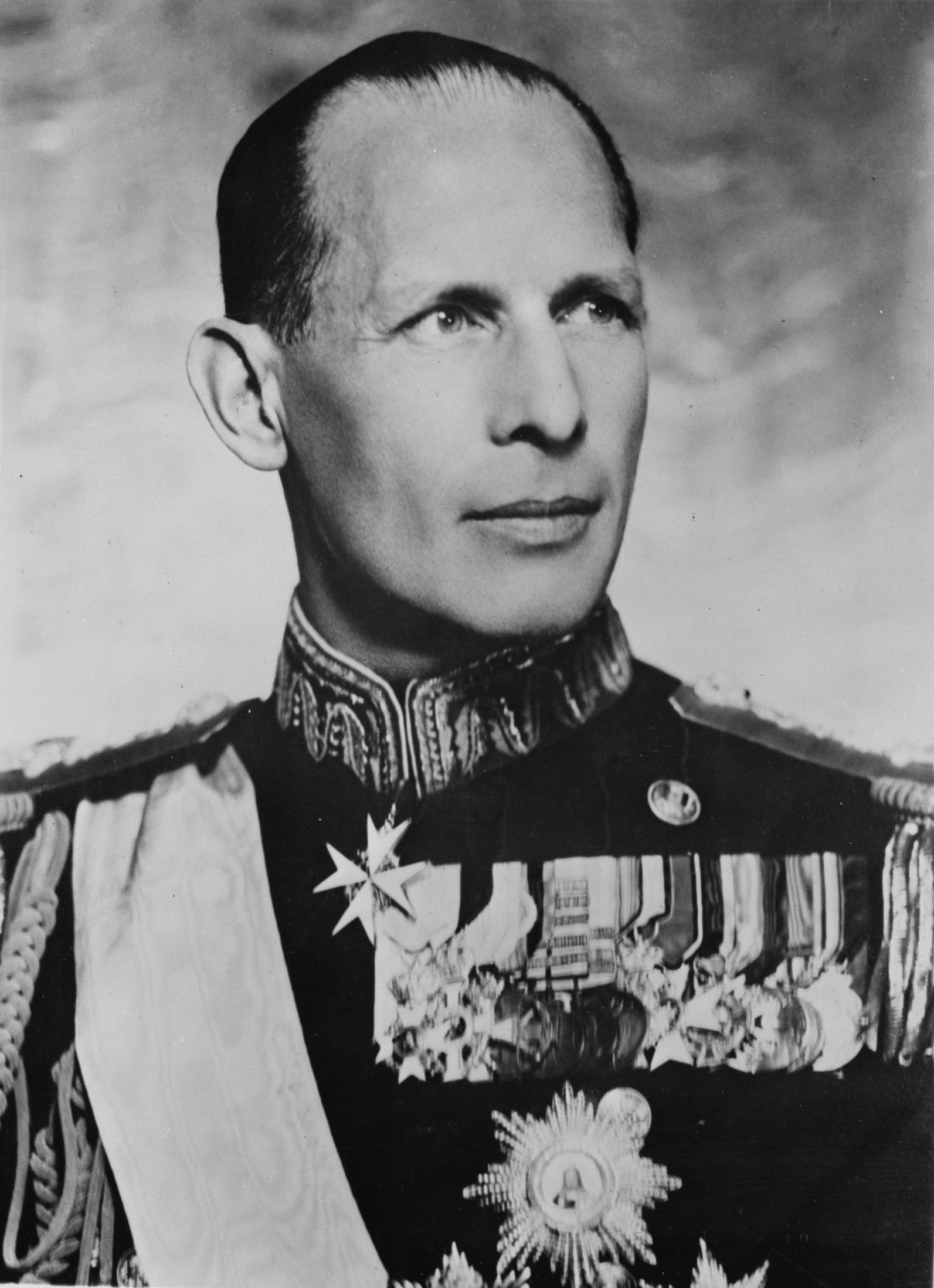
King George II, Peter's cousin

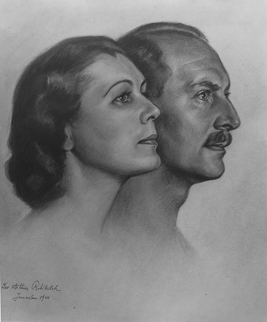
Portrait of Peter and Irina

Prince Peter and Ovtchinnikova returned to Europe in November 1939. On 13 November, he alone visited his mother at Saint-Cloud, France. Prince George refused to see him. Peter also met with his sister and her newborn daughter, Princess Tatiana Radziwill. The German invasion of France in 1940 led Peter and his wife to leave Paris and move to Assisi, Italy. The mounting tensions between Rome and Athens did not allow them to stay long. Malinowski, now working at Yale University in the United States of America, was impressed by Peter's research in Asia and offered him a position as research associate in the Anthropology Department of the university. Peter declined this offer to move to Greece and join his country's infantry in the wake of Greco-Italian War. Ovtchinnikova was still not welcome there, and instead took refuge in Istanbul. He tried to secure his wife's evacuation to India, but the Greek government intervened and assured that she stay cut off in Istanbul. King George II believed her to be a plotter, and was also wary of his cousin. The King suspected that some (particularly leftists) would like to replace him with Peter.

Germany invaded Greece on 6 April 1941. The royal family was evacuated to Crete between 22 and 23 April. Peter was not evacuated until 27 April, when the Germans entered Athens. On Crete, Peter rejoined the King, who was satisfied with his conduct and named him his personal aide de camp. On 20 May, however, Germans invaded Crete as well, but failed to capture the royal family and the ministers. They fled over the mountains to the south of the island, from where they were evacuated to Alexandria by the British destroyer HMS Decoy on 23 May. King Farouk I of Egypt was, however, hostile to the royal family due to his pro-Italian policy.

King George and Prince Paul therefore moved to London, while the majority of the family found refuge in South Africa. Peter was the only one to remain in Cairo, having been named "Representative of the King of the Hellenes in the Middle East".

The royal family's exile allowed Peter to rejoin Ovtchinnikova in Palestine. They married religiously, in a Greek Orthodox ceremony, in Jerusalem on 5 June 1941. The couple settled in Cairo, where Peter introduced his wife as a princess. This shocked the King, who did not hesitate to inform the diplomatic corps that their marriage was not recognised as dynastic and that Ovtchinnikova was not entitled to the princely dignity. Furthermore, the King placed the couple under surveillance. "The Russian", it was rumoured, wished Greece to be Orthodox but Communist and with Peter as king.

Prince Peter's chief task in the Middle East was to reorganise the remnants of the Greek royal army and prepare them to participate in the war alongside the Allies of World War II. He took part in the Western Desert campaign, the Allied invasion of Sicily and the Allied invasion of Italy, before marching to Rome at the head of an army composed of the Māori. The Allies subsequently sent him to China for a few months.

== Aftermath of the war ==
Personal cypher of Prince Peter of Greece and Denmark

The royal family could not return to Greece immediately after the war ended due to a civil war between the Communists and the Conservatives. Prince Peter was aware that King George, if allowed to return, would never allow him to move to Greece along with his wife. Therefore, he, while still in Egypt, started searching for a country where the two could settle. On 1 September 1946, a referendum confirmed George II's position. The King, however, died unexpectedly on 1 April the next year and the Prince was demobilised. Peter hoped that Paul, George II's successor, would recognise his marriage to Ovtchinnikova. King Paul agreed but only if Prince Peter officially recognised that the marriage deprived him of his dynastic rights, something the Prince had always refused to do. Peter turned down the offer and Paul prohibited him from returning to Greece.

Prince Peter and Irene Ovtchinnikova thus decided to move from Egypt to Denmark. There he met the explorer Henning Haslund-Christensen, who was about to embark on another expedition to Central Asia. Haslund-Christensen asked him not only to join the expedition, but also to head its Tibetan branch. Peter accepted. He and his wife spent the following year in the United States, raising funds for the expedition. The Prince wished to avoid any possible dispute with the Greek government and thus prudently avoided expressing his opinion about the Greek politics. While in New York, he learned of Haslund-Christensen's death and immediately contacted the expedition committee in Copenhagen. A few days later, he was relieved when he received a letter from Prince Axel of Denmark, son of Prince Valdemar and first cousin of Peter's father, who informed him that the expedition should still take place.

== Tibetan studies ==
=== First sojourn ===
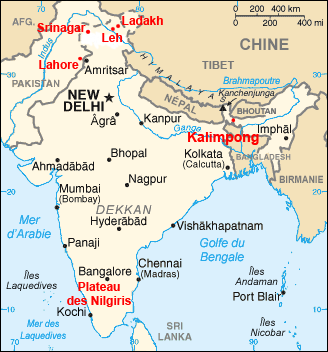
Regions and towns visited by Prince Peter and Irina Ovtchinnikova

Prince Peter and Ovtchinnikova left the United States in January 1949, travelling from California to Colombo, the capital of Ceylon. They arrived on the island on 16 February and crossed over to India, once again meeting with the Toda people. Peter was dismayed to find out that the people lived in poor sanitary conditions and that their culture was on the verge of disappearance. He then demanded that the Indian government intervene, and a hospital was built in the Nilgiris District. The pair were unable to enter Tibet or Nepal due to the recent Chinese invasion of Tibet. A large number of Tibetans fled to India, and many found refuge in Kalimpong, enabling Peter to study the people and Tibetan culture. To speak to Tibetans directly, he started learning their language.

Peter gathered anthropometric data on 3,284 persons, analysed 198 blood samples, bought clothes, jewellery, books (such as the Tengyur and Kangyur), and various other objects now found at the National Museum of Denmark and the Royal Library. He assembled a list of Tibetan noble families and, along with his wife, established biographical notes about a number of refugees (most notably about women who practised polyandry, "something really at variance with our way of conducting family affairs"), and described Tibetan Muslims. Having registered their songs, sagas, everyday conversations, oracle prophecies and religious ceremonies, Peter took more than 3,000 photographs of Tibetans. When he asked them if they had body hair (an important piece of information in anthropology), the relatively hairless Tibetans roared with laughter. They were excited when he showed them his own chest hair, and exclaimed that he must be a monkey. One man did not understand why the Prince bothered to wear a shirt, given that he already had hair.

=== Second sojourn ===
The expedition ended in 1952, and the pair went to Copenhagen, where Peter presented his findings. The committee wanted him to return and continue his research, which he did within a few weeks. He and his wife were again prohibited from entering Tibet, but this time they also faced the hostility of the Indian government. West Bengal authorities refused to allow him to collect more anthropometric data. The same year he was promoted to lieutenant colonel in the Danish Life Guards. Despite everything, Peter continued learning Tibetan and by 1954, he learned enough to be able to work without an interpreter. In mid-1953, the Prince once again left the Himalayas to head a commemorative expedition to Afghanistan in honour of Haslund-Christensen, but returned to the Himalayas within six weeks. In 1956, Peter was pleased to welcome his mother to his Kalimpong residence. She was invited by his wife, and the relations between the two women significantly improved.

The more Peter studied the Tibetans, the less he hesitated to criticise the Chinese government and occupying army, who, in turn, suspected him to be a Western spy. The government of India, on the other hand, feared the wrath of its powerful neighbour and thus proceeded to harass the Prince and Ovtchinnikova to push them out of the country. Finally, in May 1956, the pair received an eviction notice from the Indian government. The situation was complicated by Ovtchinnikova's progressing tuberculosis, and Peter pleaded with the authorities to allow them to stay until she could travel. He contacted his distant relative, the Earl Mountbatten of Burma, who had served as the last Viceroy of India, and asked him to intercede with Prime Minister Jawaharlal Nehru, Mountbatten's personal friend. Princess George also tried to intercede on behalf of her son and daughter-in-law, but failed to meet Nehru during his visit to London in June 1956. In the end, Nehru allowed the pair to stay for six more months. They departed in February 1957, without ever being told what "undesirable activities" he was guilty of. It is apparent, however, that the expulsion was the result of the direct intervention of Zhou Enlai, Prime Minister of China. During the seven years that Prince Peter spent with his wife in the Himalayas, he was able to collect "...a rich collection of artefacts and books, still and moving photography, sound recordings, ethnographic information as well as an astoundingly large set of physical anthropology data."

== Final decades ==
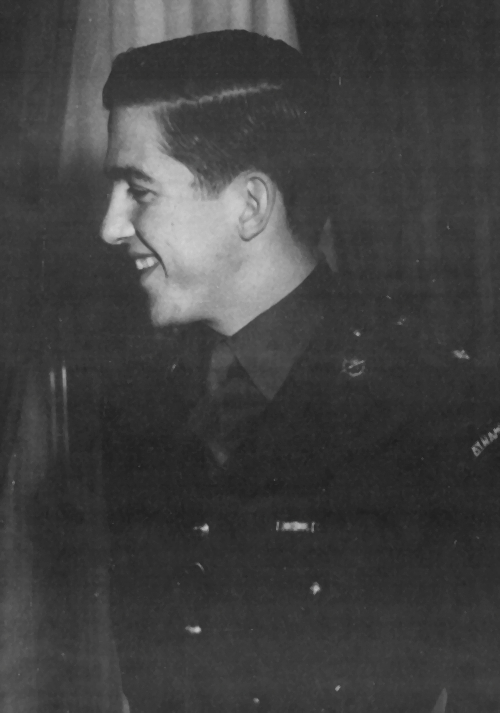
Constantine II in 1959, five years prior to his accession

Upon their return to Europe, Prince Peter and Ovtchinnikova settled in the United Kingdom, where the Prince resumed his studies at the London School of Economics. He prepared a thesis on polyandry under the mentorship of the ethnologist Sir Raymond Firth, Malinowski's successor, and received a doctorate of philosophy in 1959. In 1961, he was about to take up a post at the National and Kapodistrian University of Athens, but an intervention from the Palace deprived him of the opportunity.

After King Paul's death, Peter found himself at odds with Paul's son and successor, King Constantine II. Had he not been deemed excluded from the line of succession due to his unsuitable marriage, Peter would have been heir presumptive to Constantine II according to the original laws of succession. However, the Parliament of Greece modified the Constitution to replace the original agnatic primogeniture with male-preference cognatic primogeniture, thereby introducing a number of female dynasts and their descendants into the line of succession. King Constantine II, still unmarried and childless, thus officially recognised his only unmarried sister, Princess Irene, as heir presumptive (excluding the older sister, Princess Sophia, who was due to become Queen of Spain). Peter remained convinced that the change was illegal and that he would be the rightful heir if the King died without fathering a son.

Shortly after the King's marriage to their cousin, Princess Anne-Marie of Denmark, the uninvited Prince Peter called a press conference in Athens and openly questioned the legality of the constitutional amendment. Above all, he attacked his cousin Paul's widow, the tremendously unpopular Queen Frederika, and accused her of having a bad influence on her son. King Constantine II and Queen Anne-Marie's first child, Princess Alexia, was born in 1965 and designated as the new heir presumptive, but Peter refused to recognise that either. Following the rupture between King Constantine and Prime Minister Georgios Papandreou the same year, the Prince openly criticised the King's conduct and suggested himself as an alternative to Constantine II. However, the abolition of the monarchy and the proclamation of the Third Hellenic Republic in 1974 did not allow Peter to fulfill his dream of ascending the Greek throne.

After the monarchy was abolished, Prince Peter decided to liquidate his possessions in Greece, most notably his residence in Glyfada. From then on, he and his wife spent their time in London, Paris and Copenhagen. As the years passed by, their relationship deteriorated. They eventually decided to separate, but not officially. Ovtchinnikova moved to Hong Kong, while Peter took up a relationship with a young Englishwoman who lived with him in Copenhagen.

Prince Peter continued to support the Tibetan cause. He was the president of the Nordic Council for Tibetan Assistance and was instrumental in helping Tibetans to Scandinavia in the 1960s. In 1967 he, "...was instrumental in procuring vocational training for young Tibetans in Denmark."

== Death and burial ==
He was surprised by an offer from the Chinese government to visit the Tibet Autonomous Region in the late 1970s. He accepted, but did not advise the Dalai-Lama to return, as the Chinese seemed to ask. Within a few months, he was planning another visit to the Himalayas, to film the areas he had visited in his youth. He died of intracranial haemorrhage before he could do so, at the National Hospital for Neurology and Neurosurgery in London on 15 October 1980.

A memorial mass for Prince Peter was held at St Sophia's Cathedral, London, on 22 October. It was attended by his widow and the Greek royal family, including Queen Frederika, who once again ostracised Ovtchinnikova. His body remained unburied for 340 days. In his testament, he requested that he be buried among the members of his family at Tatoi Palace, but only if his widow would be buried there as well. He compromised by agreeing that the tomb inscription would describe her as "Irina, spouse of Prince Peter, née Alexandrovna Ovtchinnikova" rather than as a Greek princess. The Greek government, however, refused to allow his burial in Greece. The royal family was relieved that Ovtchinnikova would not be buried among the royals, but was left with the question of where he should be buried. Finally, he was buried in the grounds of his Danish palace, Lille Bernstorff, on 25 September 1981. Ten years later, Ovtchinnikova was buried next to him.

== Ancestry ==
Ancestors of Prince Peter of Greece and Denmark

8. Christian IX of Denmark
4. George I of Greece
9. Princess Louise of Hesse-Kassel
2. Prince George of Greece and Denmark
10. Grand Duke Konstantin Nikolayevich of Russia
5. Grand Duchess Olga Constantinovna of Russia
11. Princess Alexandra of Saxe-Altenburg
1. Prince Peter of Greece and Denmark
12. Prince Pierre Napoléon Bonaparte
6. Roland Bonaparte, 6th Prince of Canino and Musignano
13. Éléonore-Justine Ruflin
3. Princess Marie Bonaparte
14. François Blanc
7. Marie-Félix Blanc
15. Marie Hensel

== See also ==
- E. E. Speight
