= Edmond Blanc =

French politician (1856–1920)

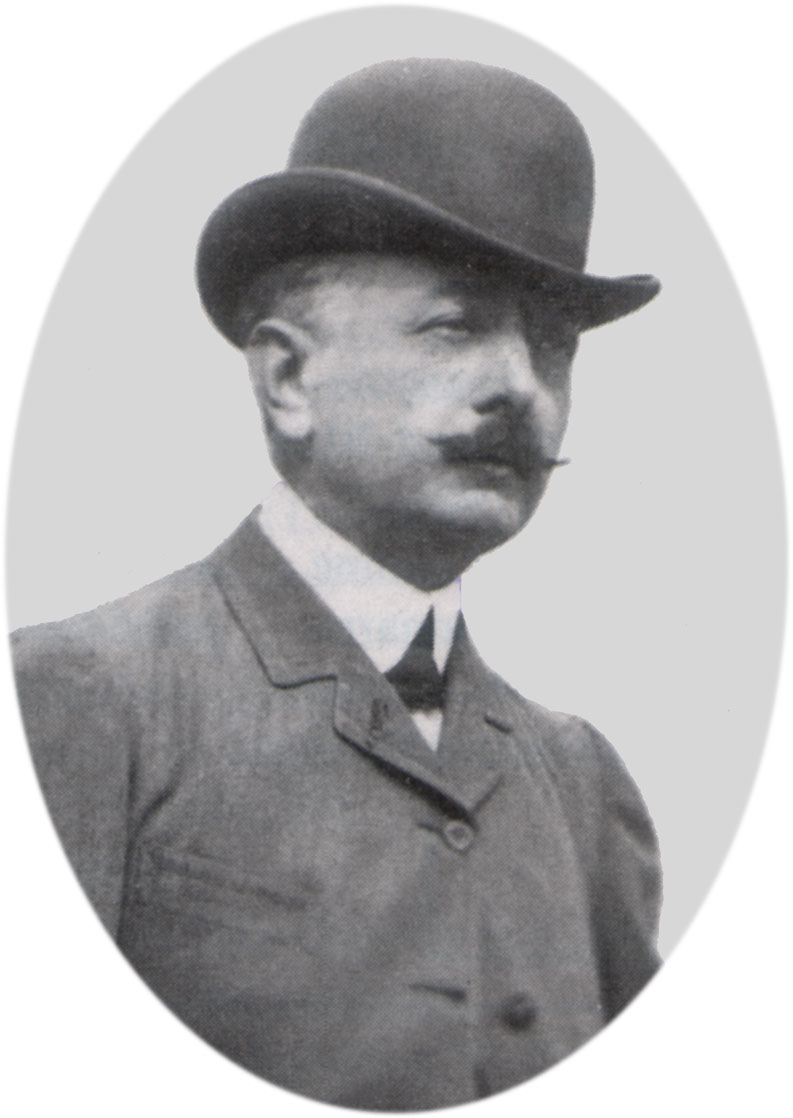
- Born: 22 February 1856; Paris, France
- Died: 12 December 1920 (aged 64); Neuilly-sur-Seine, France
- Occupation: Politician
- Spouses: Héloïse Marot; Marthe Galinier
- Children: 2 sons
- Parent(s): François Blanc; Marie Hensel
- Relatives: Camille Blanc (half-brother); Marie-Félix Blanc (sister)

Edmond Blanc (22 February 1856 – 12 December 1920) was a horse breeder as well a French politician.

He served as a member of the Chamber of Deputies from 1893 to 1894, and from 1898 to 1902, representing Hautes-Pyrénées. He also served as the mayor of La Celle Saint-Cloud. He was the owner of several stud farms in La Celle Saint-Cloud, Haras Villebon and Haras Hardy. He built the racecourse of Saint-Cloud inaugurated in 1901 along with a horse training center named La Fouilleuse. He won the Grand Prix de Paris seven times.

In December 1879, he received the honorary noble title of Comes Romanus (Papal Count) granted by the Roman Curia, bestowed by Pope Leo XIII.

The Prix Edmond Blanc at the Saint-Cloud Racecourse is named in his memory.
