= Marie Charlotte Blanc =

German businesswoman

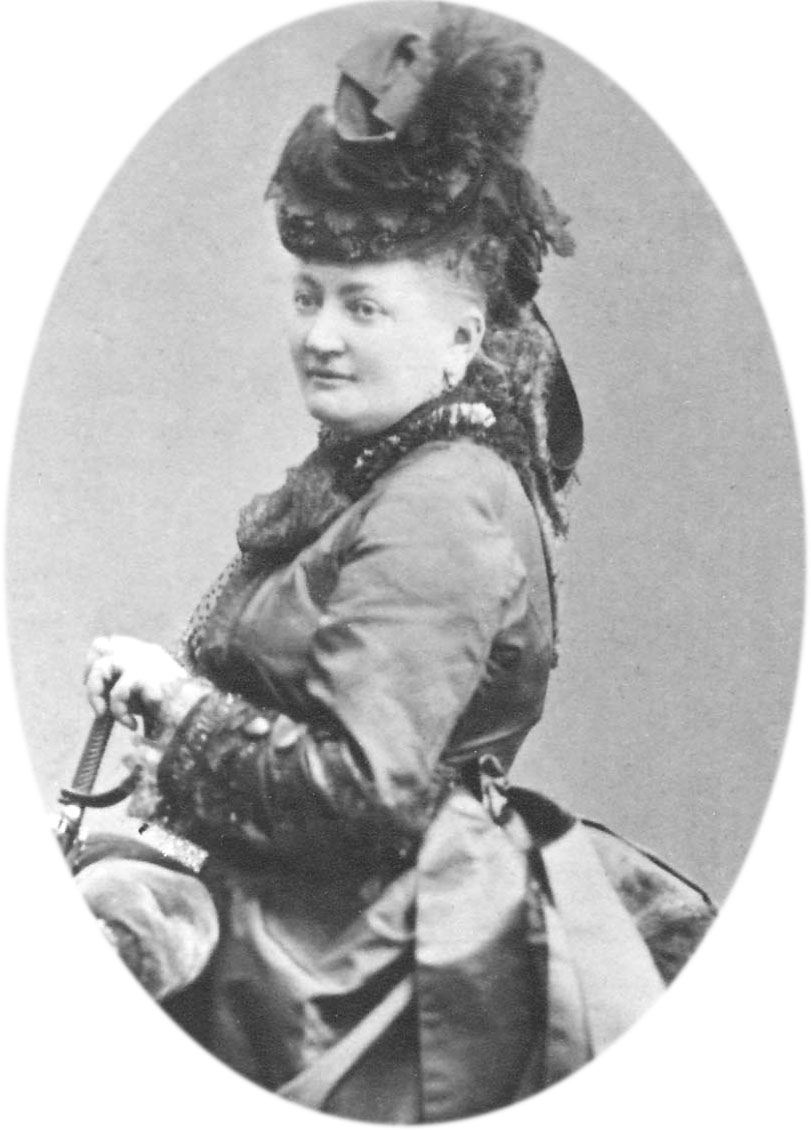
- Born: Marie Charlotte Hensel; 23 September 1833; Friedrichsdorf, Hochtaunuskreis, Grand Duchy of Hesse, German Confederation
- Died: 25 July 1881 (aged 47); Moûtiers, Savoie, Auvergne-Rhône-Alpes, French Third Republic
- Spouse: François Blanc (m. 1854; died 1877)
- Children: Louise, Princess Constantine Radziwiłł; Edmond Blanc; Princess Marie-Félix Bonaparte

Marie Charlotte Blanc (née Hensel; 23 September 1833 – 25 July 1881) was a German socialite and businesswoman. She was a prominent member of high society in Monaco and France. After the death of her husband, François Blanc, she operated the Monte Carlo Casino.

== Early life ==
Marie Charlotte Hensel was born on 23 September 1833 in Friedrichsdorf to working class parents. She was a daughter of Catherine (née Stemler) Hensel and Caspar Hensel, a shoemaker.

== Career ==
In 1856, Charles III of Monaco hired François Blanc, who successfully operated a casino in Germany, to create a casino in Monaco. He founded the Monte Carlo Casino and, in 1861, co-founded the Société des bains de mer de Monaco. While living in Monaco, Hensel helped her husband establish the casino in Monte Carlo. On 27 July 1877 her husband died due to respiratory problems while in Leukerbad, Switzerland for treatment. After her husband's death, Hensel inherited 72 million francs and took control of the Monte Carlo Casino. She worked with Charles Garnier to build the Opéra de Monte-Carlo.

== Personal life ==
At the age of 14 she entered service as a maid for French businessman François Blanc; his wife, Madeleine-Victoire Huguelin; and their two children, Camille and Charles, at their home in Bad Homburg vor der Höhe. While in their service, Hensel learned to speak French. In 1852 Madeleine-Victoire Huguelin died. On 20 June 1854 Blanc and Hensel married in Paris. They had three children:

- Louise Antoinette Sophie Marie Blanc (1854–1911), who married Prince Constantine Radziwiłł.
- Edmond Blanc (1856–1920), who became Mayor of La Celle Saint-Cloud.
- Marie-Félix Blanc (1859–1882), who married Prince Roland Bonaparte.

In 1871, Hensel purchased the Château d'Ermenonville for her daughter, Louise. She died on 25 July 1881 in Moûtiers.

== Gallery ==
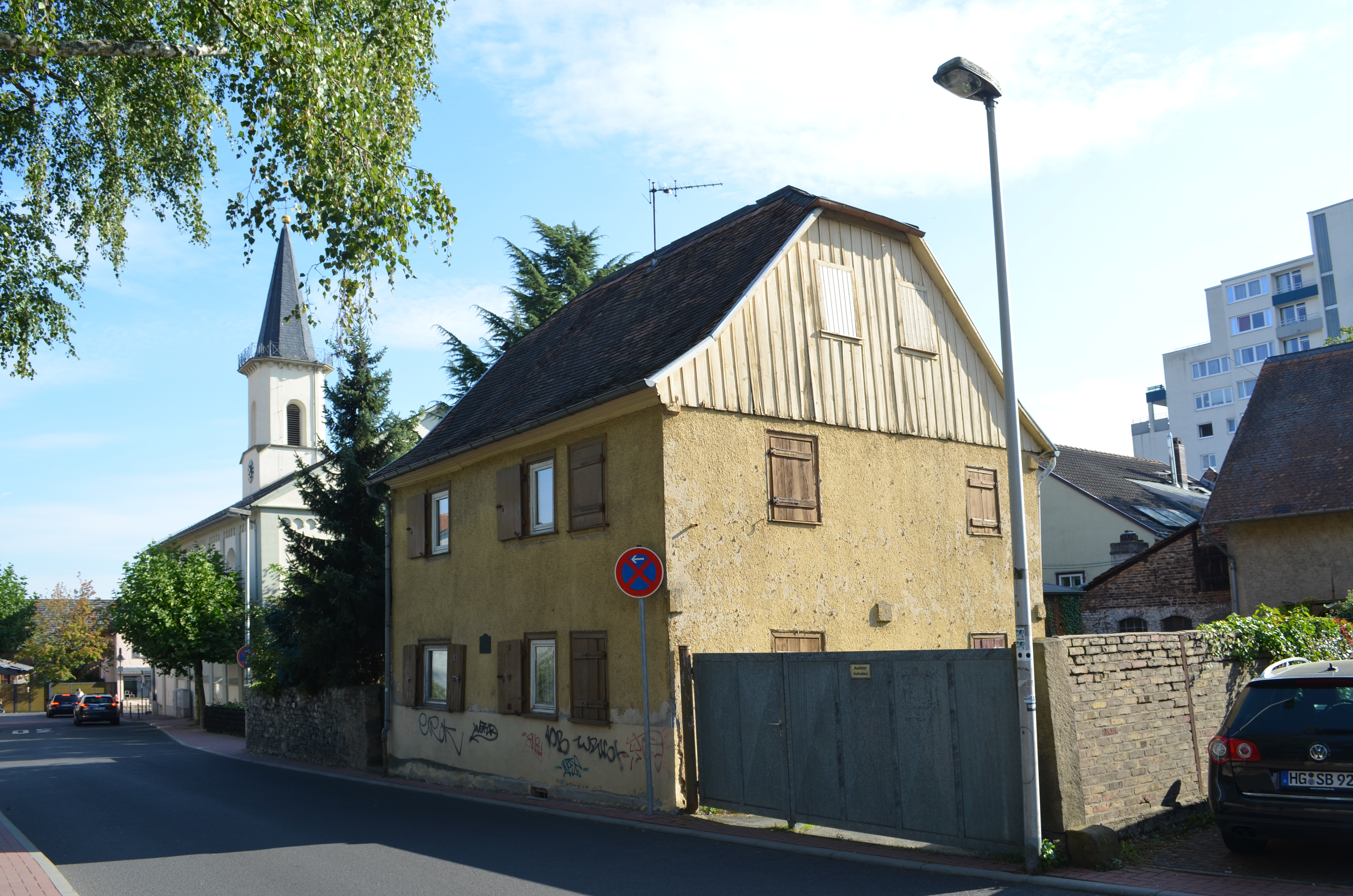
House of Maries's birth in Friedrichsdorf, Taunusstrasse 4

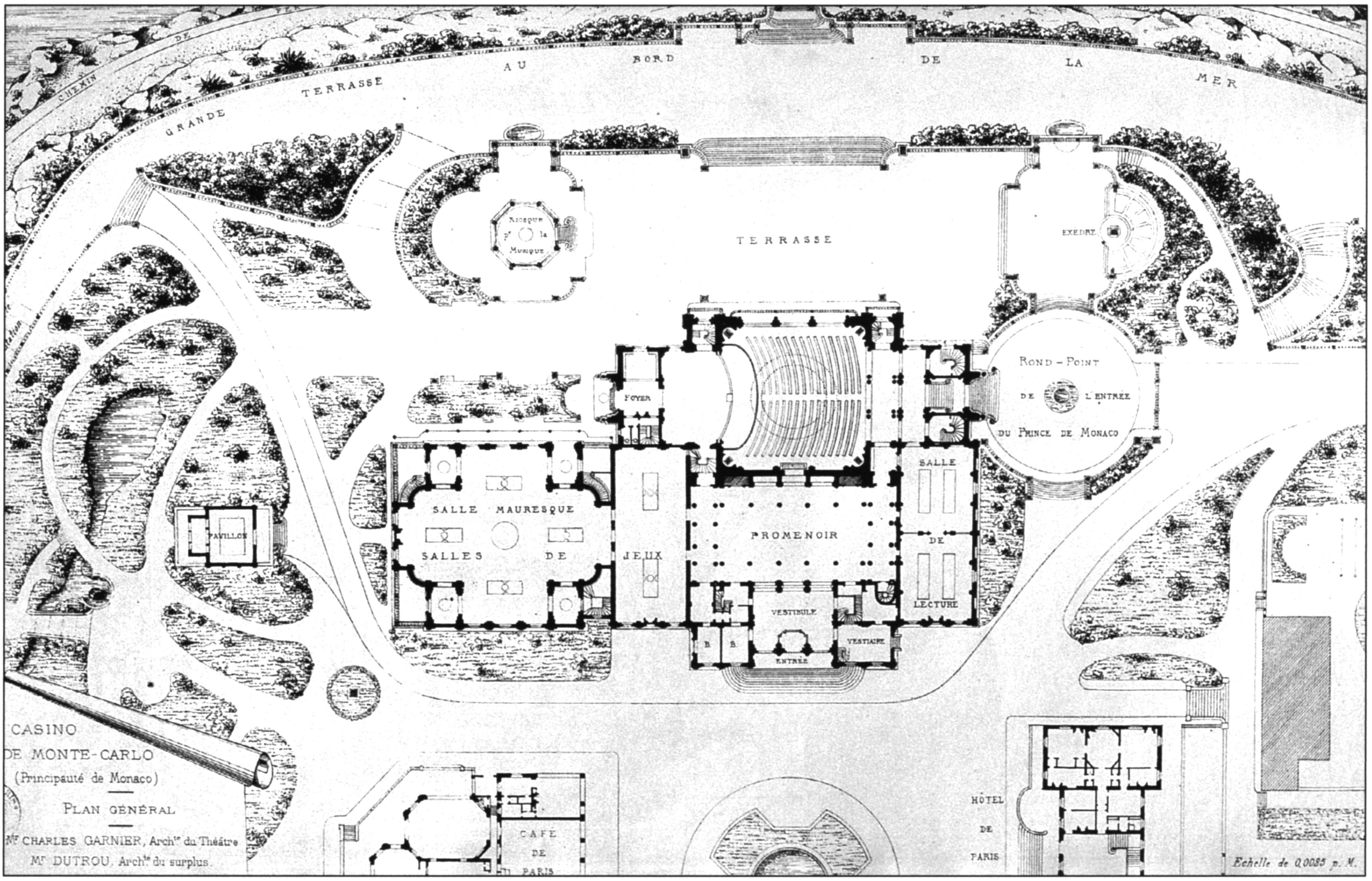
General plan by Garnier and Dutrou, two years after her inheritance

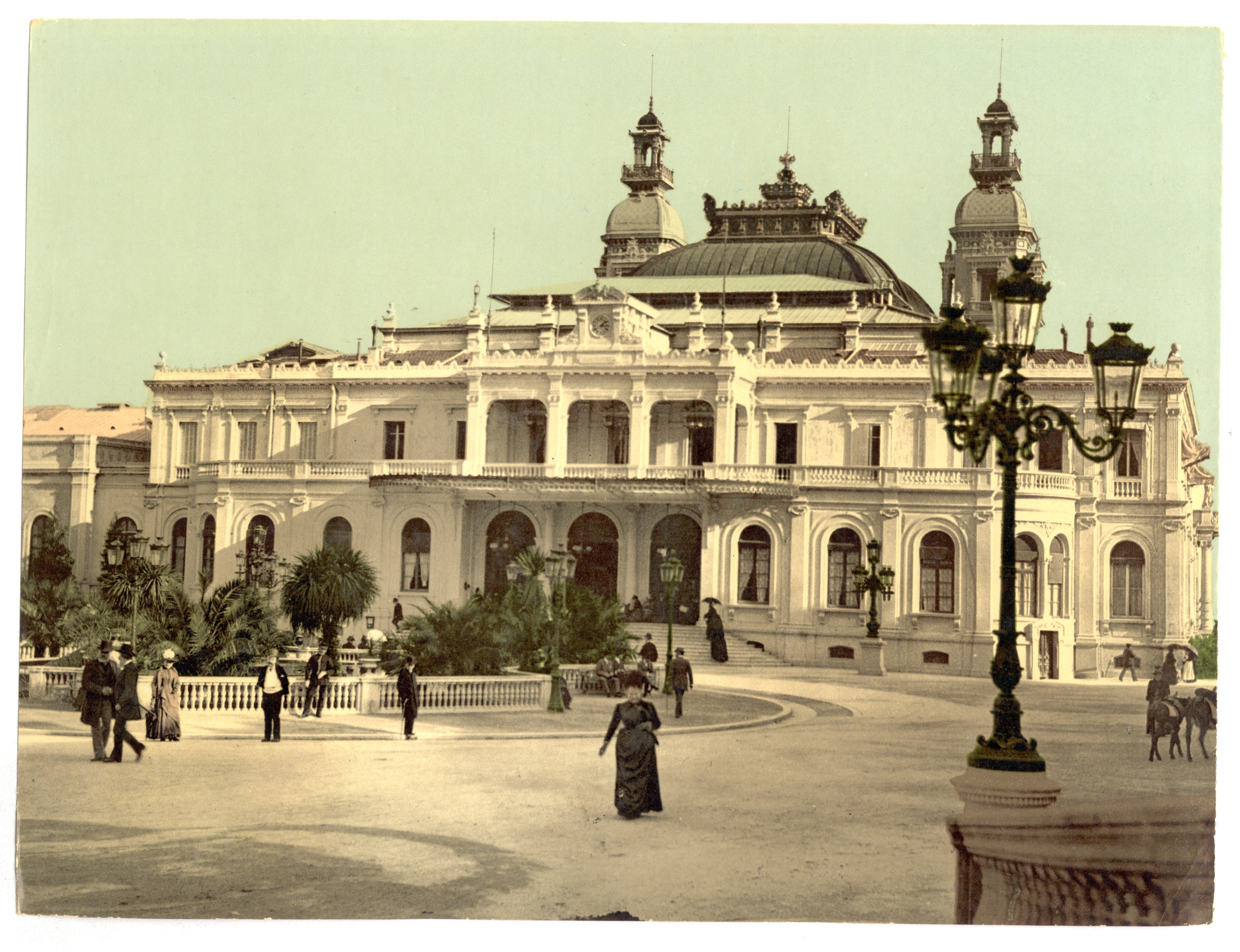
Facade on the Place du Casino after the expansion of 1878–79
