= Princess X =

Sculpture by Constantin Brancusi

- Artist: Constantin Brâncuși
- Year: Between 1915–1916
- Type: Bronze sculpture, limestone base
- Dimensions: 61.7 cm × 22.2 cm × 40.5 cm (24.3 in × 8.7 in × 15.9 in)

Princess X is a sculpture by the artist Constantin Brâncuși depicting the Princess Marie Bonaparte, a Freudian psychoanalyst and aristocrat. An initial version in marble is now in the Sheldon Museum of Art at the University of Nebraska–Lincoln, whilst two versions as a polished bronze atop a limestone block stands 61.7 cm (2 ft 1/4 in) tall (both created between 1915 and 1916) are now in the collections of the Philadelphia Museum of Art and the Musée national d'Art moderne in Paris.

The work was originally part of a "notorious scandal" when the Salon des Indépendants removed Princess X from display for its apparent obscene content, after some objected to the sculpture's phallic resemblance. Brâncuși was reportedly shocked and declared the incident a misunderstanding; he had created Princess X to evoke feminine desire and vanity.

== Scandal in Paris ==
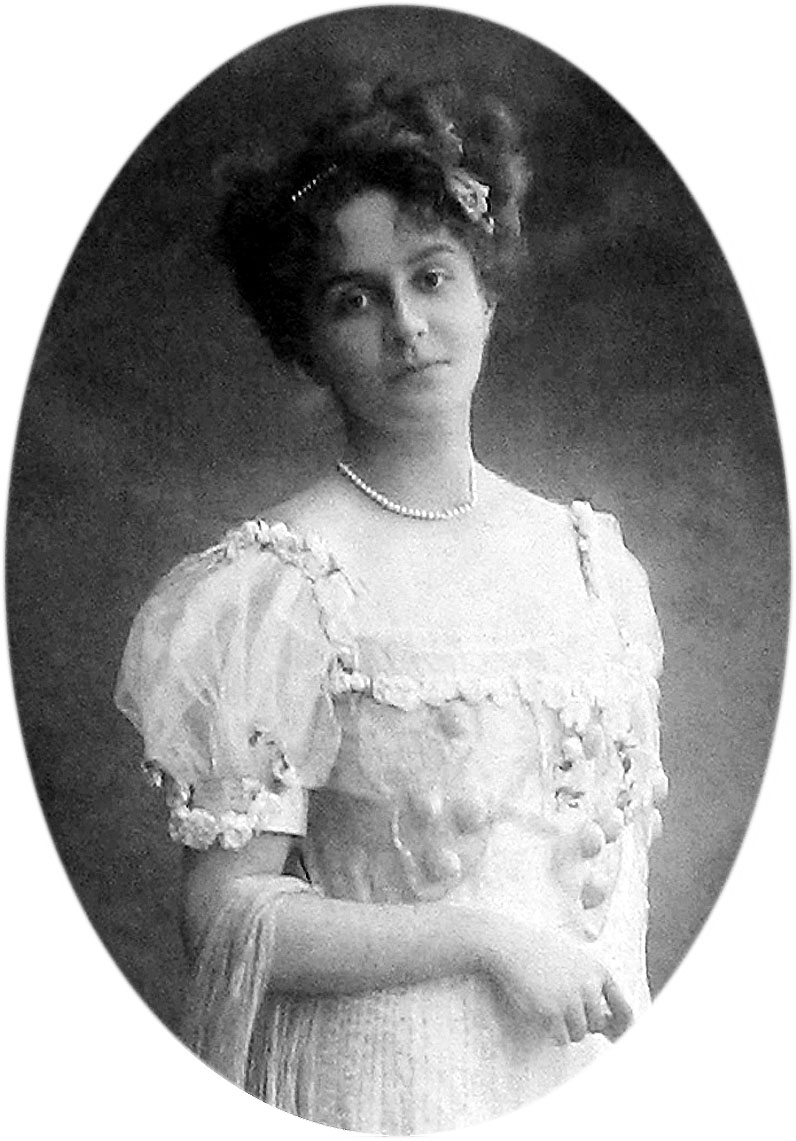
Princess Marie Bonaparte

Brâncuși insisted the sculpture had been his rendition of Marie Bonaparte and discussed the comparison of the bronze figure to the princess. He described his detestation of Marie, as a "vain woman." He claimed she went as far as placing a hand mirror on the table at mealtimes, so she could gaze upon herself. The sculpture's C-like form reveals a woman looking over and gazing down, as if looking into an object. The large anchors of the sculpture resemble the "beautiful bust" which she possessed. Without knowing the context, to a viewer Princess X could look like an erect penis. Brâncuși allows the princess to gaze upon herself in an eternal loop locked in the bronze sculpture.

The style of Brâncuși "was largely fueled by myths, folklore, and primitive culture," this combined with the modern materials and tools Brâncuși used to sculpt, "formed a unique contrast...resulting in a distinctive kind of modernity and timelessness." The technique Brâncuși was known for and used on Princess X could be mistaken for a penis, but in fact it was the simple form of a woman.

What my art is aiming at, is above all realism; pursue the inner hidden reality, the very essence of objects in their own intrinsic fundamental nature: this is my only preoccupation.

— Constantin Brâncuși

== Cultural references to Princess X ==
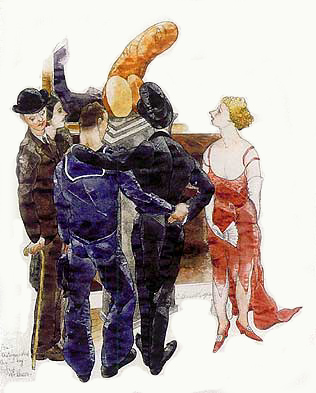
Charles Demuth's work Distinguished Air

The publisher Robert McAlmon's 1925 collection of short stories Distinguished Air is set in the gay culture of 1920s Berlin. One of these stories revolves around an exhibition of Princess X, and the audience's reaction to it.

In 1930, the watercolour painter Charles Demuth painted Distinguished Air, based on this story. Two of the viewers, one a gay sailor in uniform, study the phallus-like sculpture, emphasized in the painting. The husband of a married couple, an American with the 'distinguished air' of the title, is more interested in admiring the sailor.

== Bibliography ==
- Brancusi (Brâncuși), Constantin (1876–1957). Westport, CT: Greenwood Press, 2004.
- Balas, Edith. Brâncuși and His World. Pittsburgh: Carnegie Mellon University Press, 2008.
- Bass, Jennifer Durham. Brâncuși, Constantin. Vol. 1. Millerton, NY: Grey House Publishing, Inc, 2007.
- Chave, Anna. Constantin Brâncuși: Shifting the Bases of Art. New Haven Yale UP (1993).
- Miller, Sanda. Constantin Brâncuși. London: Reaktion (2010).
