= Marie Bonaparte =

French writer, psychoanalyst, and Princess of Greece and Denmark (1882–1962)

- Princess George of Greece and Denmark
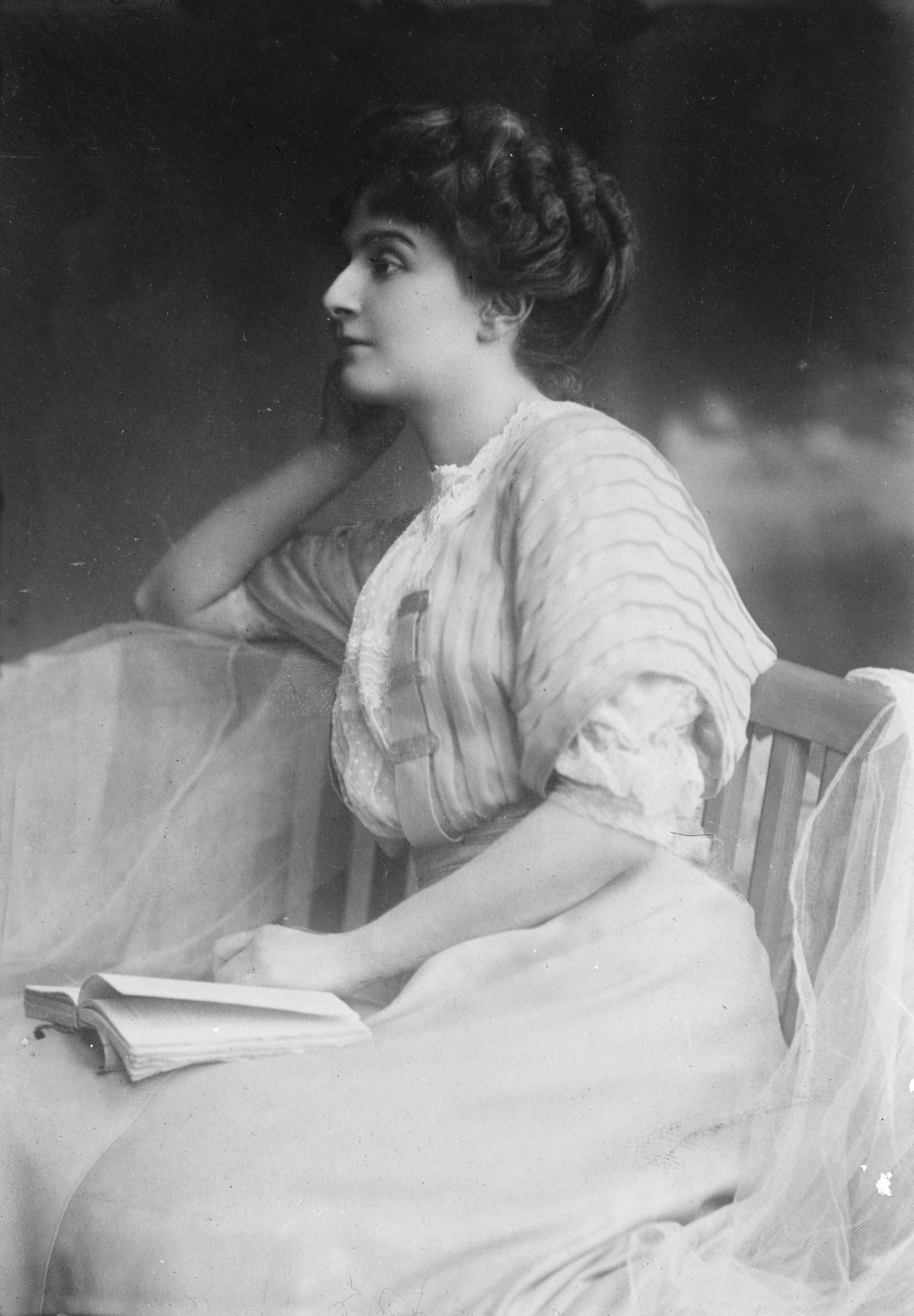
- Born: 2 July 1882; Saint-Cloud, French Third Republic
- Died: 21 September 1962 (aged 80); Saint-Tropez, France
- Burial: Royal Cemetery, Tatoi Palace, Greece
- Spouse: Prince George of Greece and Denmark (m. 1907; died 1957)
- Issue: Prince Peter; Princess Eugénie
- House: Bonaparte
- Father: Roland Napoléon Bonaparte, 6th Prince of Canino and Musignano
- Mother: Marie-Félix Blanc

Princess Marie Bonaparte (2 July 1882 – 21 September 1962), known as Princess George of Greece and Denmark upon her marriage, was a French author and psychoanalyst, closely linked with Sigmund Freud. Her wealth contributed to the popularity of psychoanalysis and enabled Freud's escape from Nazi Germany.

Marie Bonaparte was a great-grandniece of Emperor Napoleon I of France. She was the only child of Roland Napoléon Bonaparte, 6th Prince of Canino and Musignano (1858–1924) and Marie-Félix Blanc (1859–1882). Her paternal grandfather was Prince Pierre Napoleon Bonaparte, son of Lucien Bonaparte, 1st Prince of Canino and Musignano, Napoleon's rebellious younger brother. For this reason, despite her title, Marie was not a member of the dynastic branch of the Bonapartes who claimed the French imperial throne from exile. Her maternal grandfather was François Blanc, the principal real estate developer of Monte Carlo. It was from this side of her family that Marie inherited her great fortune.

== Early life ==
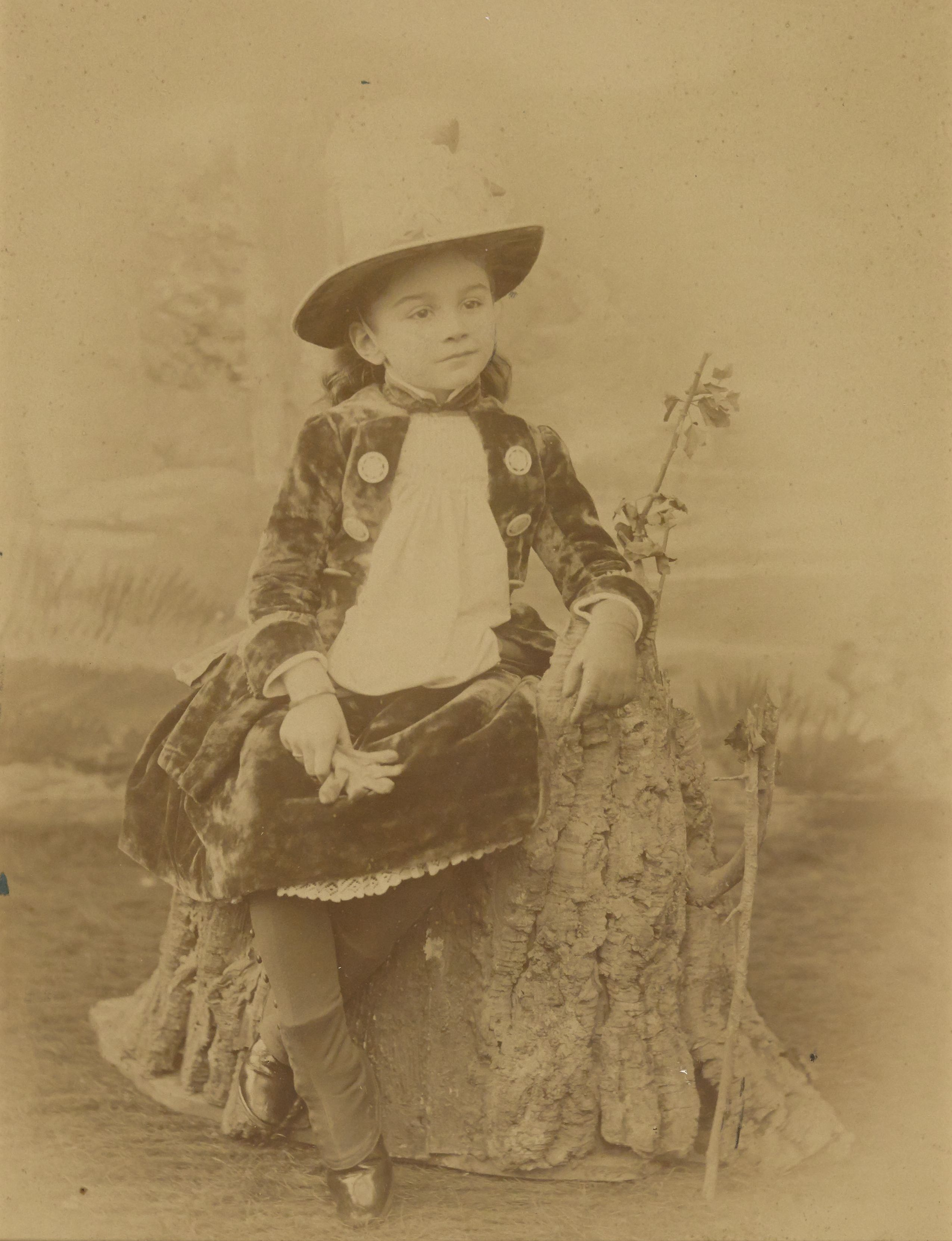
The young Marie Bonaparte during the 1890s

She was born at Saint-Cloud, a town in Hauts-de-Seine, Île-de-France and called Mimi within the family. Her maternal grandfather, François Blanc, had left an estimated fortune of FF 88M when he died in 1877. However, his widow, born Marie Hensel, left mostly debts for her three children, including Marie's mother Marie-Félix, to pay off upon her death in July 1881. Prince Roland protected his wife's fortune by persuading her to renounce that of her late mother before the amount of her debts became known. Marie-Felix died of an embolism shortly after Marie's birth, leaving half of her FF 8.4M dowry to her husband and half to her daughter. Most was managed in trust during Marie's youth by her father, who had few financial resources of his own. Marie lived with her father, a published geographer and botanist, in Paris and on various family country estates where he studied, wrote and lectured, leading an active life in Parisian academic circles and on expeditions abroad, while her daily life was supervised by tutors and servants. Affected by phobias and hypochondria as a youth, Marie spent much of her time in seclusion, reading literature and writing the personal journals which reveal her inquisitive spirit and early commitment to the scientific method reflected in her father's scholarship.

== Engagement ==
Royal Monogram of Princess Marie Bonaparte

Several candidates for future husband presented themselves or were considered by Prince Roland for his daughter's hand, notably a distant cousin of the princely House of Murat, Prince Hermann of Saxe-Weimar-Eisenach and Louis II, Prince of Monaco. Following a Parisian luncheon Prince Roland hosted for King George I of Greece in September 1906, the king agreed to the prospect of a marriage between their children. Prince George of Greece and Denmark, second of the king's five sons, was introduced to Marie on 19 July 1907 at the Bonapartes' home in Paris. Although homosexual, he courted her for twenty-eight days, confiding that from 1883, he'd lived not at his father's Greek court in Athens, but at Bernstorff Palace near Copenhagen with Prince Valdemar of Denmark, his father's youngest brother. The Queen had taken the boy to Denmark to enlist him in the Danish royal navy and consigned him to the care of Valdemar, who was an admiral in the Danish fleet. Feeling abandoned by his father on this occasion, George described to his fiancée the profound attachment he developed for his uncle. He admitted that, contrary to what he knew were her hopes, he could not commit to living permanently in France since he was obligated to undertake royal duties in Greece or on its behalf if summoned to do so.

=== Inheritance and wealth ===
Once his proposal of marriage was accepted, the bride's father was astonished when Marie's fiancée Prince George waived any contractual clause guaranteeing an allowance or inheritance from Marie; she would retain and manage her own fortune (a trust yielding 800,000 francs per annum, her father leaving 60 million francs on his death in 1924) and only their future children would receive legacies. The approximate value of Marie's 800,000 franc annuity was equivalent to £32,000 in November 1907, (equivalent to £3,328,283 in 2025) The value of her father's estate of 60 million francs was worth approximlately £484,000 to £1,320,000 during the 1920s owing to the significant fluctuations in the foreign exchange rate of the French franc during this period.

Marie's mother had reportedly brought her husband a dowry worth 8,400,000 francs in 1880, as well as a reversionary right to a further 6,000,000 francs which she would receive after her mother's death.

== Married life ==
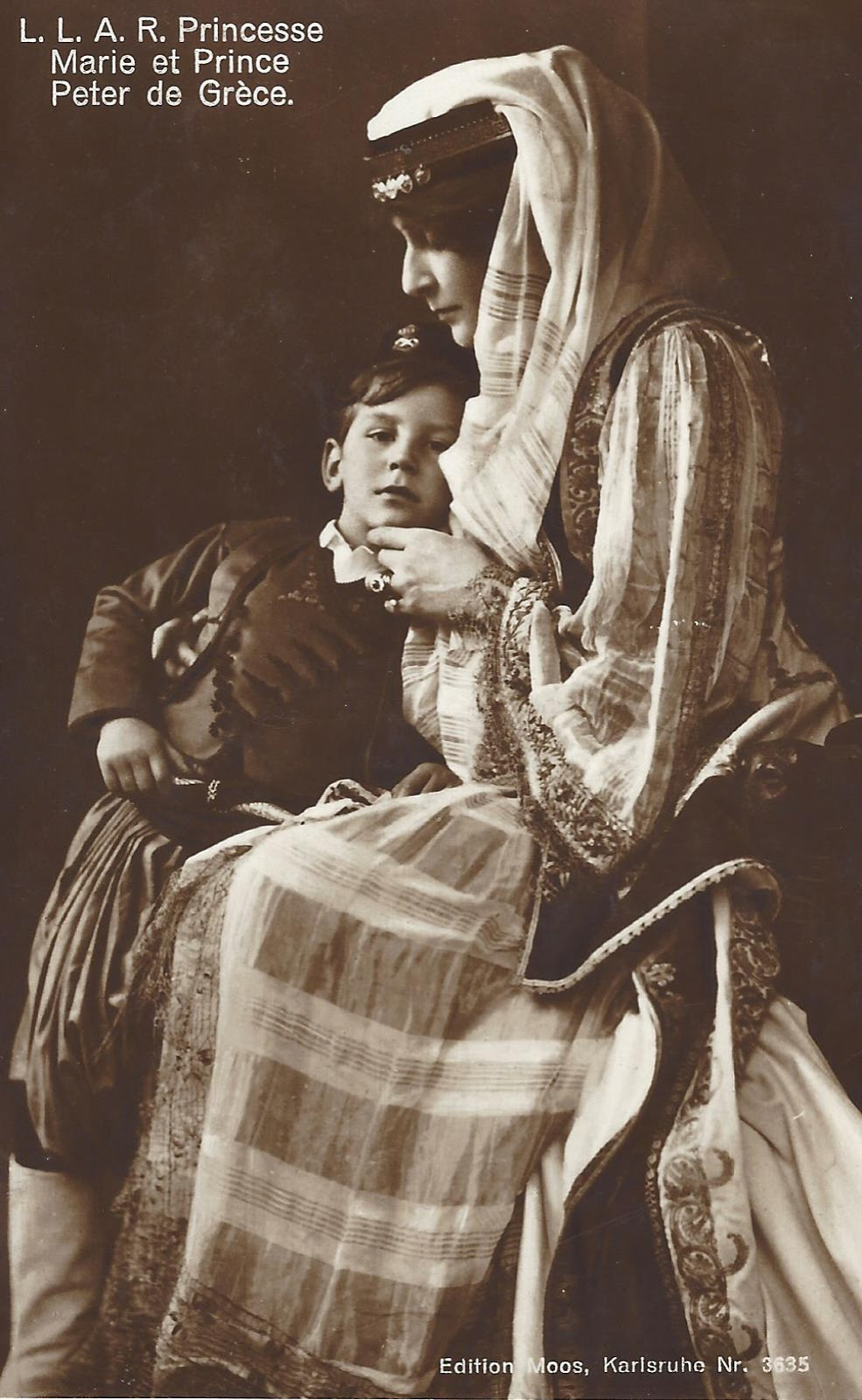
Marie with her son Peter in traditional Greek costume, 1912

On 21 November 1907 in Paris, Marie and George were married in a civil ceremony, with a subsequent Greek Orthodox ceremony on 12 December 1907, at Athens. Thereafter she was known as Princess George of Greece and Denmark.

By March 1908 Marie was pregnant and, as agreed, the couple returned to France to take up residence. When George brought his bride to Denmark for the first visit with his uncle, Prince Valdemar's wife, Marie d'Orléans, was at pains to explain to Marie Bonaparte the intimacy which united uncle and nephew, so deep that at the end of each of George's several yearly visits to Bernstorff he would weep, Valdemar would fall sick, and the women learned the patience not to intrude upon their husbands' private moments. During the first of these visits, Marie Bonaparte and Valdemar found themselves engaging in the kind of passionate intimacies she had looked forward to with her husband who, however, only seemed to enjoy them vicariously, sitting or lying beside his wife and uncle. On a later visit, Marie Bonaparte carried on a passionate flirtation with Prince Aage, Count of Rosenborg, Valdemar's eldest son. In neither case does it appear that George objected, or felt obliged to give the matter any attention. Marie Bonaparte came to admire the forbearance and independence of Valdemar's wife under circumstances which caused her bewilderment and estrangement from her own husband.

Although Marie occasionally joined her husband in Greece or elsewhere for national holidays and dynastic ceremonies, their life together was spent mostly on her estates in the French countryside. For months at a time, George was in Athens or Copenhagen, while Marie was in Paris, Vienna or traveling with the couple's children. That pattern allowed each to pursue activities in which the other had little interest.

The couple had two children, Peter (1908–1980) and Eugénie (1910–1989).

From 1913 to early 1916, Marie carried on an intense flirtation with French prime minister Aristide Briand, but went no further because she did not want to share him with his mistress, the actress Berthe Cerny. Matters came to a head in April 1916, when Berthe Cerny broke off the relationship. The affair with Briand lasted until May 1919. In 1915 Briand wrote to her that, having come to know and like Prince George, he felt guilty about their secret passion. George tried to persuade him that Greece, officially neutral during World War I but whose King was suspected of sympathy for the Central Powers, really hoped for an Allied victory: He may have influenced Briand to support the Allied expedition against the Bulgarians at Salonika. When the prince and princess returned in July 1915 to France following a visit to the ailing King Constantine I in Greece, her affair with Briand had become notorious and George expressed a restrained jealousy. By December 1916 the French fleet was shelling Athens and in Paris Briand was suspected, alternately, of having seduced Marie in a futile attempt to bring Greece over to the Allied side, or of having been seduced by her to oust Constantine and set George upon the Greek throne.

== Sexual research ==
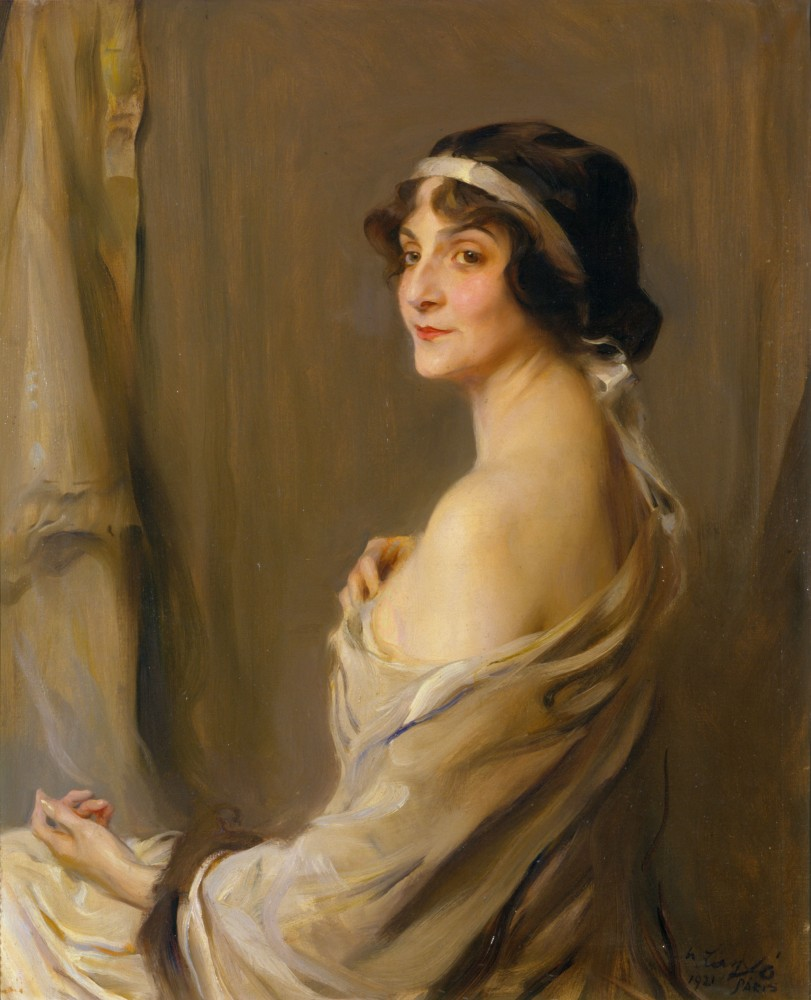
Portrait by Philip de László, 1921

Despite what she described as sexual dysfunction, Marie Bonaparte conducted affairs with Sigmund Freud's disciple Rudolph Loewenstein as well as Aristide Briand, her husband's aide-de-camp Lembessiss, a prominent married French physician, and possibly others. Troubled by her difficulty in achieving sexual fulfillment, Marie engaged in research. In 1924, she published her results under the pseudonym A. E. Narjani and presented her theory of frigidity in the medical journal Bruxelles-Médical, having measured the distance between the vagina and the clitoral glans in 200 women. After analyzing their sexual history she concluded that the distance between these two organs was critical for the ability to reach orgasm (volupté) during vaginal intercourse. She identified women with a short distance (the paraclitoridiennes) who reached orgasm easily during intercourse, and women with a distance of more than two and a half centimeters (the téleclitoridiennes) who had difficulties while the mesoclitoridiennes were in between. Bonaparte considered herself a téleclitoridienne and approached Josef Halban to surgically move her clitoris closer to her vagina. She underwent and published the procedure as the Halban–Narjani operation. When it proved unsuccessful in facilitating the sought-after outcome for Marie, the physician repeated the operation.

She modeled for the Romanian modernist sculptor Constantin Brâncuși. His sculpture of her, "Princess X", created a scandal in 1919 when he represented her or caricatured her as a large gleaming bronze phallus, although he declared this a misunderstanding as he meant the sculpture to suggest her desire and vanity. This sculpture can be seen to symbolize the model's obsession with the penis and her lifelong quest to achieve vaginal orgasm.

== Freud ==
In 1925, Marie consulted Freud for treatment of what she described as her frigidity, which was later explained as a failure to have orgasms during missionary position intercourse. It was to Marie Bonaparte that Freud remarked, "The great question that has never been answered and which I have not yet been able to answer, despite my thirty years of research into the feminine soul, is 'What does a woman want?'".

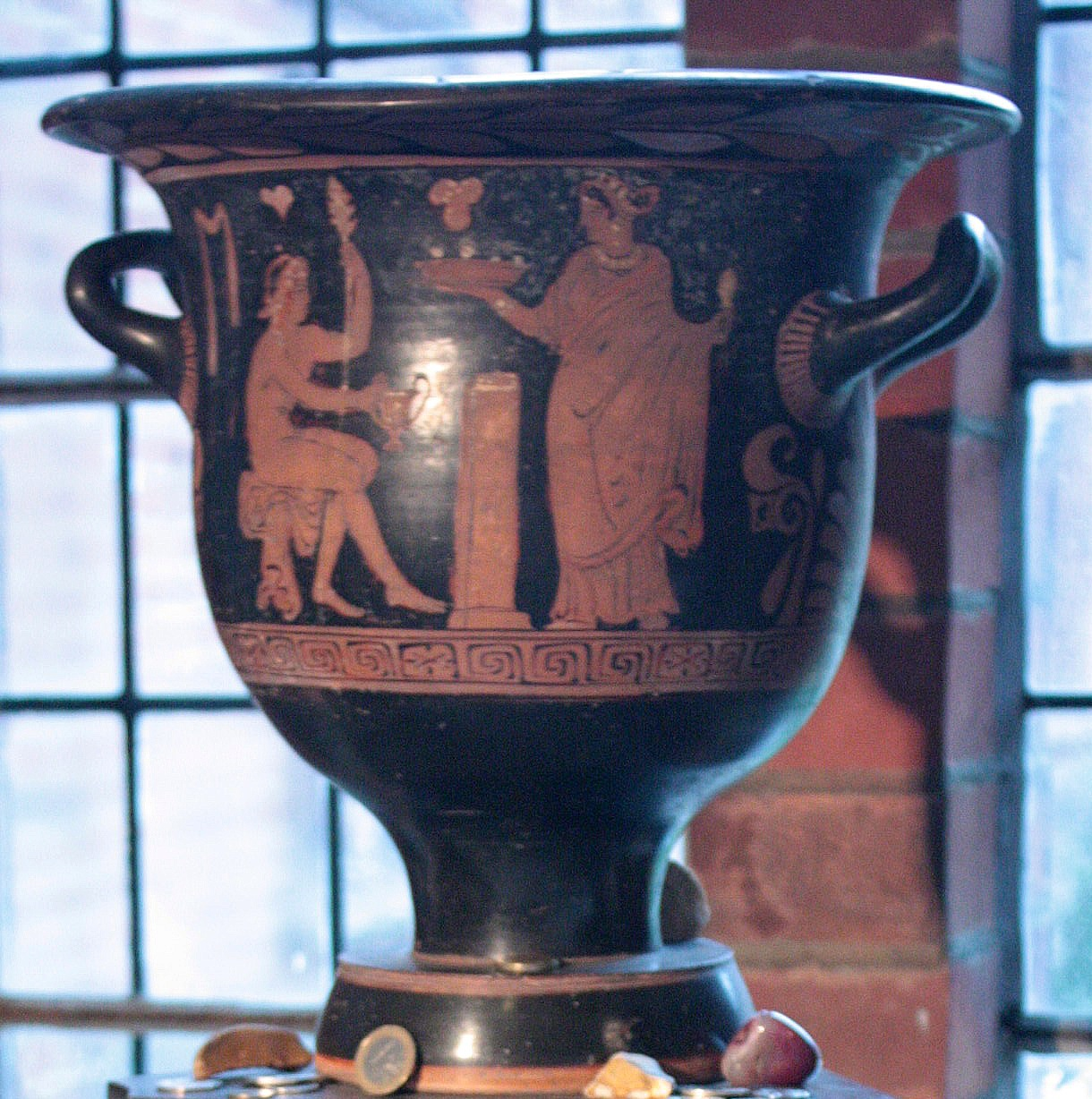
The 4th century BC South Italian Apulian bell krater given by Marie Bonaparte to Sigmund Freud, which today contains the ashes of Freud and his wife Martha

Although Prince George maintained friendly relations with Freud, in 1925 he asked Marie to give up her work in psychoanalytical studies and treatment to devote herself to their family life, but she declined.

Robed in the diplomatic immunity of a member of a reigning European royal family and possessed of great wealth, Marie was often able to help those threatened or despoiled by World War II. When the Greek royal family were in exile or Greece was under occupation, she helped support her husband's banished relatives, including allowing the family of her husband's nephew, Prince Philip of Greece, to occupy one of her homes in Saint-Cloud and paying for their private schooling while sending her own children to public lycées.

Later she paid Freud's ransom to Nazi Germany and bought the letters Freud had written to Wilhelm Fliess about his use of cocaine from Fliess's widow when he could not afford her price. Freud asked her to destroy the letters. She refused, but agreed never to read them. She was instrumental in delaying the search of Freud's apartment in Vienna by the Gestapo in early 1938, and helped him obtain an exit visa to depart Austria. She also smuggled out some of his savings in a Greek diplomatic pouch, provided him with additional funding to leave the country, and arranged for the transport to London of some of his possessions, including his analytic couch. Freud arrived himself in London on 6 June 1938.

In 1938, Bonaparte proposed that the United States purchase Baja California and turn it into a new Jewish state. Freud refused to take what he called her "colonial plans" seriously, but Bonaparte nonetheless authored letters to William Christian Bullitt Jr. and Franklin D. Roosevelt to advocate for the idea.

== Later life ==
On 2 June 1953, Marie and her husband represented their nephew, King Paul of Greece, at the coronation of Elizabeth II in London. Bored with the pageantry, Marie offered a sampling of the psychoanalytic method to the gentleman seated next to her, the future French president François Mitterrand. Mitterrand obliged Marie, and the pair barely witnessed the pomp and ceremony, finding their own dialogue far more interesting.

She practiced as a psychoanalyst until her death in 1962, providing substantial services to the development and promotion of psychoanalysis. She authored several books on psychoanalysis, translated Freud's work into French and founded the French Institute of Psychoanalysis (Société Psychoanalytique de Paris SPP) in 1926. In addition to her own work and preservation of Freud's legacy, she also offered financial support for Géza Róheim's anthropological explorations. A scholar on Edgar Allan Poe, she wrote a biography and an interpretation of his work.

Bonaparte's translation of a sentence in Freud's thirty-first Vorlesung ('lecture'), Wo Es war, soll Ich werden, generated some controversy. Strachey translated it into English as "Where Id was, Ego shall be". Lacan, arguing that Freud used "das Es" (lit. 'the It') and "das Ich" (lit. 'the I') when he intended the meaning to be "Id" and "Ego", suggested "Wo Es war, soll Ich werden" be translated "Where It was, there shall I come to be". Bonaparte translated it into French as le moi doit déloger le ça, meaning in English roughly "Ego must dislodge Id", which according to Lacan is directly contrary to Freud's intended meaning.

== Death ==
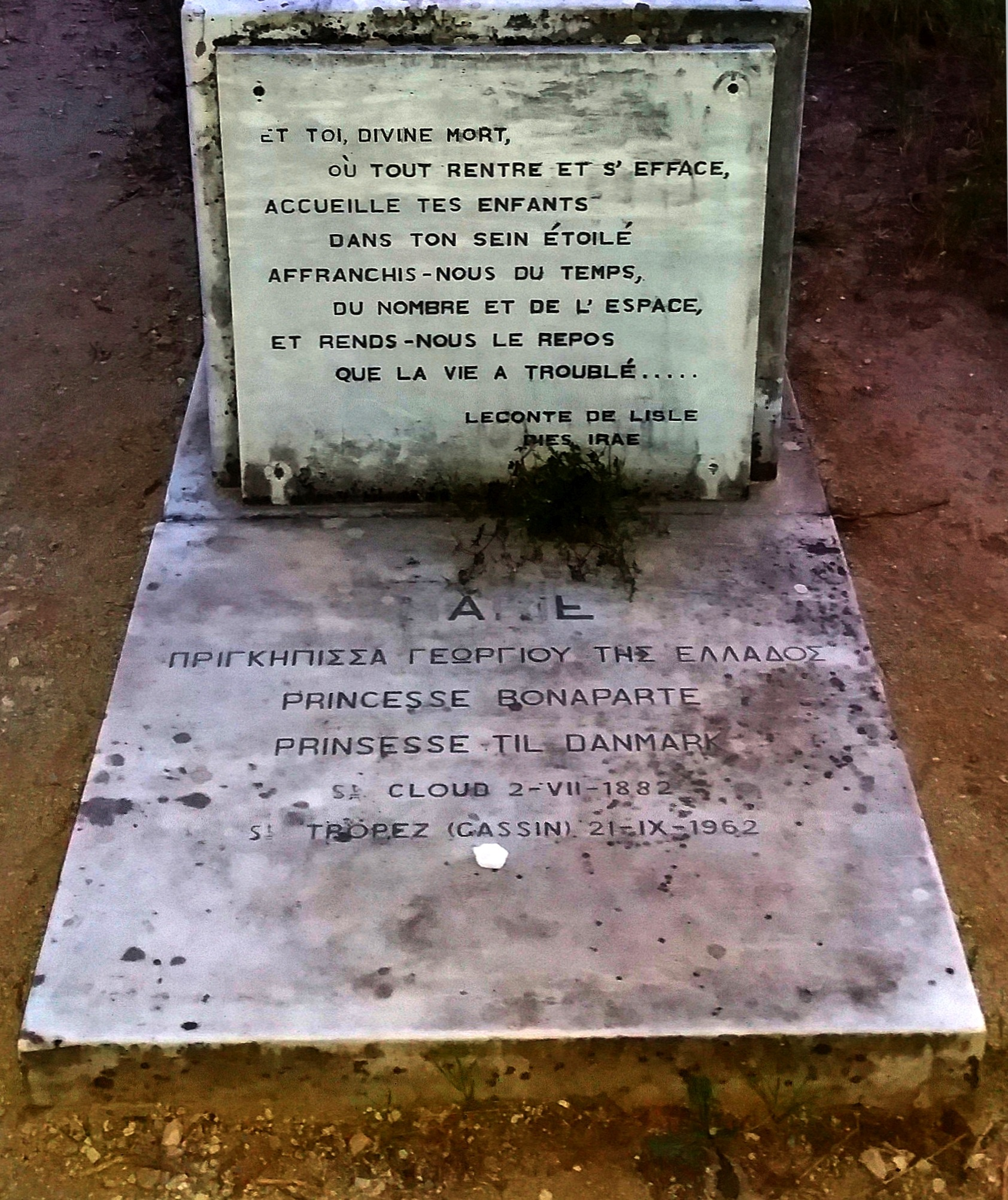
Grave of Princess Marie (née Bonaparte) at her husband's tomb

Bonaparte died of leukemia in Saint-Tropez on 21 September 1962. She was cremated in Marseille, and her ashes were interred adjacent to Prince George's tomb at Tatoï, near Athens.

== Legacy ==
The story of her relationship with Sigmund Freud, including assisting his family's escape into exile, was made into a television film in 2004 as Princesse Marie, directed by Benoît Jacquot, starring Catherine Deneuve as Princess Marie Bonaparte and Heinz Bennent as Freud.

== Honours ==
=== Dynastic ===
- (Kingdom of Greece) Greek royal family:
  - Grand Cross of the Royal Order of Saints Olga and Sophia, 1st Class
  - Commander of the Royal Order of Beneficence
  - Recipient of the Royal Decoration of the Greek Royal House, 2nd Class
  - Recipient of the Royal Red Cross Medal

=== Foreign ===
- (German Empire) House of Hohenzollern: Dame of the Imperial and Royal Decoration of the Cross of Merit
- United Kingdom: Recipient of the Queen Elizabeth II Coronation Medal

== Works ==
- "Le Printemps sur mon Jardin." Paris: Flammarion, 1924.
- "Topsy, chow-chow, au poil d'or." Paris: Denoel et steele, 1937.
- The Life and Works of Edgar Allan Poe: A Psycho-Analytic Interpretation with a foreword by Sigmund Freud – 1934 (translated into English, 1937)
- Topsy – 1940 – a love story about her dog
- "La Mer et le Rivage." Paris: for the author, 1940.
- "Monologues Devant la Vie et la Mort." London: Imago Publishing Co., 1951.
- "De la Sexualite de la Femme." Paris: Press Universitaires de France, 1951.
- "Psychanalyse et Anthropologie." Paris: Press Universitaires de France, 1952.
- "Chronos, Eros, Thanatos." London: Imago Publishing Co., 1952.
- "Psychanalyse et Biologique." Paris: Press Universitaires de France, 1952.
- Five Copy Books – 1952
- Female Sexuality – 1953
- "A La Mémoire Des Disparus" London: Chorley & Pickersgill Ltd., 1953

== See also ==
- Princess X, the 1916 bronze sculpture by Brâncuși

== Bibliography ==
- Bertin, Celia, Marie Bonaparte: A Life, Yale University Press, New Haven, 1982. ISBN 0-15-157252-6
- Loewenstein, Rudolf, Drives, Affects and Behavior: Essays in Honor of Marie Bonaparte, 1952
