= François Blanc =

French entrepreneur and operator of casinos

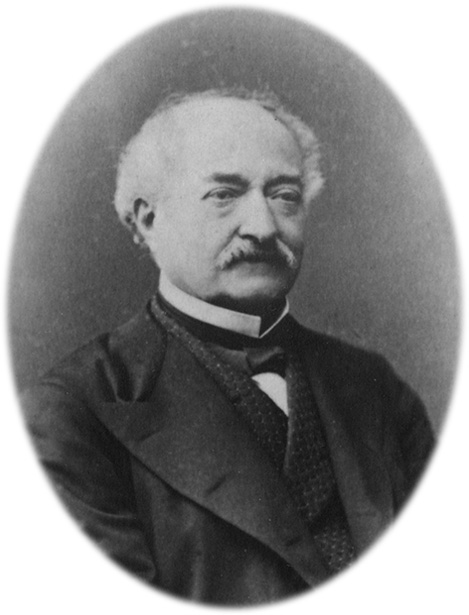
- Born: 12 December 1806; Courthézon
- Died: 27 July 1877 (aged 70); Loèche-les-Bains
- Occupations: Businessman, Property developer
- Spouse(s): Madeleine-Victoire Huguelin; Marie Charlotte Hensel
- Children: Camille Blanc; Charles Blanc; Louise Blanc; Edmond Blanc; Marie-Félix Blanc
- Relatives: Princess Marie Bonaparte (granddaughter)

François Blanc (French: [fʁɑ̃swa blɑ̃]; 12 December 1806 – 27 July 1877), nicknamed "The Magician of Homburg" and "The Magician of Monte Carlo", was a French entrepreneur and operator of casinos, including the Monte Carlo Casino in Monaco. His daughter, Marie-Félix, married Prince Roland Bonaparte.

== Early life ==
François and his twin brother Louis were born on 12 December 1806. Growing up in a small town, they were impressed every time a circus came to town. The show seemed so interesting and simple, so they followed the circus to learn all the tricks of the trade. The boys were dreaming of becoming rich and successful and learned much by working different jobs.

== Career ==
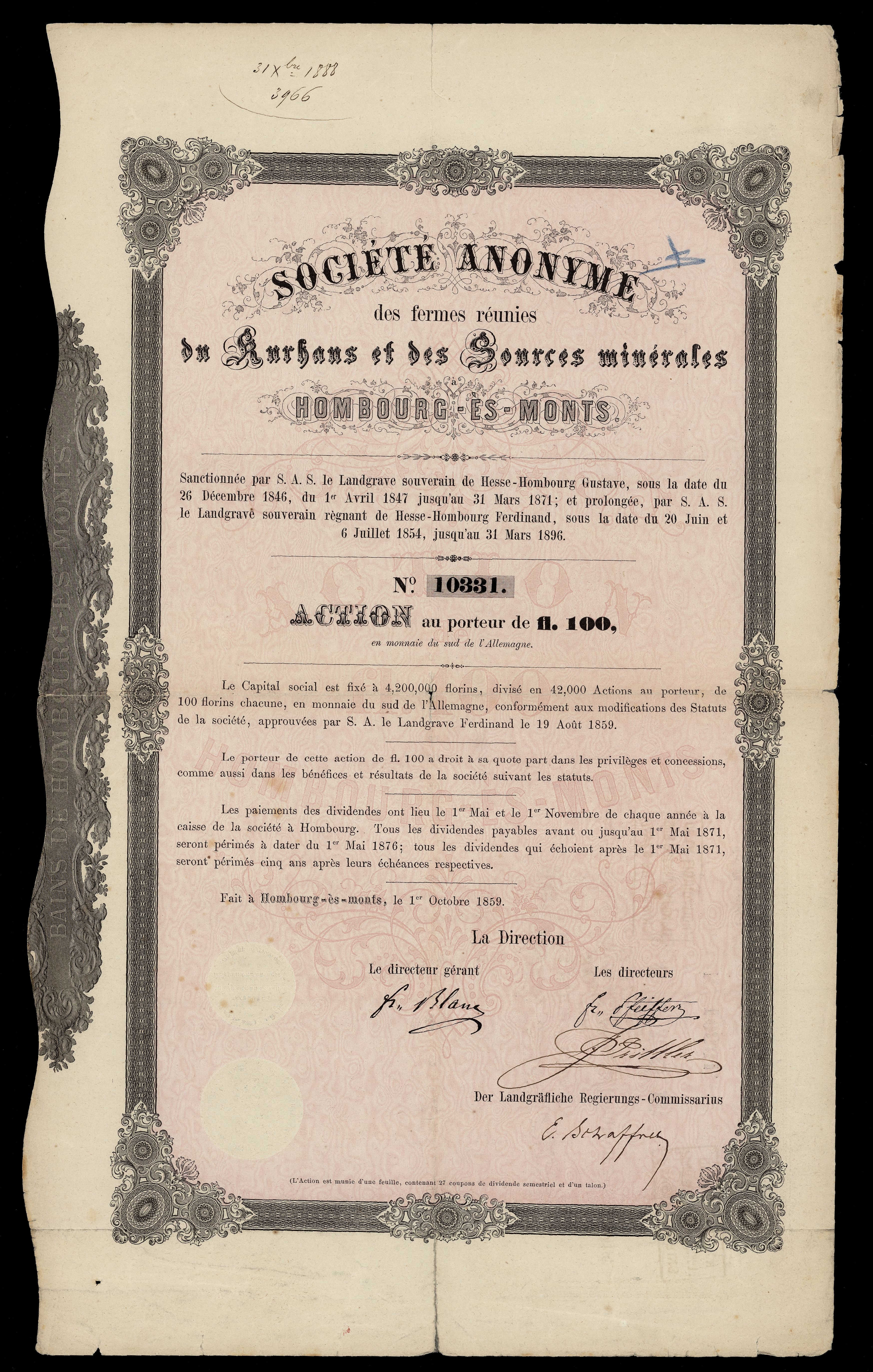
Share of the "Société anonyme des fermes réunies du Kurhaus et des Sources minérales à Hombourg-ès-monts", issued 1 October 1859, signed by François Blanc

The brothers started to work in gambling businesses in Marseilles and earned some money. They then decided to develop their own business and started to speculate in government pensions and real estate development. They soon attracted attention to their business and were arrested, but their sentence was short, because laws had not been adopted yet for such cases. They were released and moved to Paris, but after King Louis Philippe passed new laws, they had to move again - to Luxembourg. They ran a profitable business there but it was just a stepping stone to their success in Hesse-Homburg near Frankfurt, where the brothers signed a contract with the Landgrave to help service the debts of the city and to develop the tourism industry.

One innovation was the introduction of the single 0 style roulette wheel in 1843. This allowed Bad Homburg to compete against the casinos of Paris which offered the traditional wheel with both single and double zero house pockets. Local legend says that François Blanc supposedly bargained with the devil to obtain the secrets of roulette. The legend is based on the fact that the sum of all the numbers on the roulette wheel (from 0 to 36) is 666, which is the "Number of the Beast".

Homburg became popular with entertainment, gambling houses, and hotels. People visited for a new diversion and fun. Eventually François Blanc earned the nickname "The Magician of Homburg".

Homburg could attract visitors only in the summer months, as during the winter tourists preferred to travel to warmer places. This gave François the idea to move South and open a year-round business.

It happened that Charles III, Prince of Monaco had recently legalized gambling, so "The Magician of Homburg" became the first person to establish a casino operation in Monaco. To establish Monaco as a gambling mecca for the elite of Europe, he invested in roads and railways to facilitate travel to Monaco as a new place of rest and relaxation. The Prince gave François the freedom he needed to be successful, so he turned from "The Magician of Homburg" to "The Magician of Monte Carlo" and left his mark on the history of Monaco.

== Personal life ==
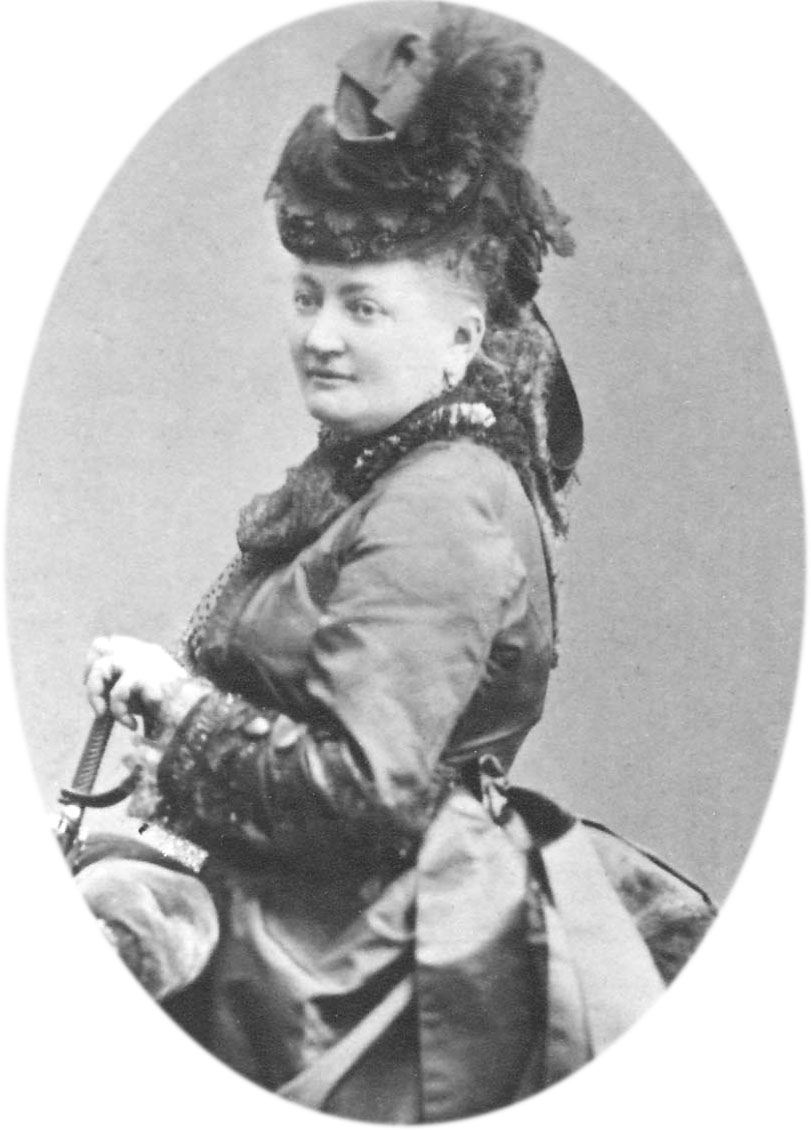
Blanc's second wife, Marie Charlotte Hensel.

Blanc was twice married. His first wife was Madeleine-Victoire Huguelin (1823–1852). Together, they were the parents of:

- Camille Blanc (1847–1927), who married Elisabeth Lanxade (b. 1852) in 1885.
- Charles Blanc (1848–1872), who died aged 24.

After the death of his first wife, he remarried to Marie Charlotte Hensel (1833–1881), with whom he had:

- Louise Blanc (1854–1911), who married in 1876 Prince Constantine Wincenty Maria Radziwiłł (1850–1920), a grandson of Prince Antoni Radziwiłł and Princess Louise of Prussia.
- Edmond Blanc (1856–1920), who married Héloïse Marot (b. 1853) and Marthe Galinier (1874–1947).
- Marie-Félix Blanc (1859–1882), who married in 1880 Prince Roland Bonaparte (1858–1924).

Blanc died in Loèche-les-Bains on 27 July 1877.

=== Descendants ===
Through his daughter Louise, he was the grandfather of Louise Adela Radziwiłł (1877–1942), who married Armand de La Rochefoucauld, duc de Doudeauville (parents of Marie de La Rochefoucauld, who married Henri-Antoine-Marie de Noailles, 11th Prince de Poix) and Prince Léon Radziwiłł, who married Princess Dolores Radziwiłł and Antonine de Gramont.

Through his daughter Marie-Félix, he was the grandfather of Princess Marie Bonaparte (1882–1962), who married Prince George of Greece and Denmark, the second son of George I of Greece and Olga Konstantinovna of Russia, and is remembered chiefly for having once saved the life of the future Emperor of Russia, Nicholas II in 1891 during their visit to Japan together.
