= Irina Ovtchinnikova =

Irina Ovchinnikova
- Marquise de Monléon; Princess Peter of Greece and Denmark
- Born: Irina Aleksandrovna Ovchinnikova; 4 October 1904; Saint Petersburg, Russian Empire
- Died: 13 March 1990 (aged 85); Paris, France
- Burial: Lille Bernstorff, Denmark
- Spouse: Jehan, marquis de Monléon (m. 1919; div. 1930) Lewis Sloden (m. 1932; div. 1936) Prince Peter of Greece and Denmark (m. 1939; died 1980)
- Father: Alexander Pavlovich Ovchinnikov
- Mother: Lydia Ivanovna Jouriary

Princess Irina of Greece and Denmark (née Irina Aleksandrovna Ovchinnikova (Russian: Ирина Александровна Овчинникова); 4 October 1904 – 13 March 1990), formerly Irène, marquise de Monléon, was a white émigré who married the anthropologist Prince Peter of Greece and Denmark and assisted him in his research.

== First and second marriage ==
Ovchinnikova was born in Saint Petersburg to Alexander Pavlovich Ovchinnikov, member of the wealthy Russian merchant family and his wife, Lydia Ivanovna Jouriary. Her paternal grandfather, Pavel Akimovich Ovchinnikov, was the founder and owner of a factory which supplied the Imperial Court with golden items, was an honorary citizen of Moscow and a Speaker of the Moscow City Duma.

On 26 November 1919, she married Jehan de Monléon, marquis de Monléon (uncle of Rose de Monléon, wife of Prince Stanisław Albrecht Radziwiłł), in Nice, France. She was only 15-years-old. Their marriage ended in divorce on 17 July 1930.

She took Lewis (Slodon) Sloden, a British art dealer, as her second husband in London on 9 November 1932.

She met the 27-year-old Prince Peter in the summer of 1935 and the two soon started a romantic relationship. He introduced her to his mother, Princess Marie, but the royal family strongly disapproved of Peter's relationship with "the Russian" (as they dubbed her) and were wary of her influence over the Prince. After King George II's restoration to the Greek throne in the autumn of 1935, Peter left for Athens. Ovtchinnikova threatened with suicide, leading King George to compare her with Anna Karenina.

== Royal marriage ==
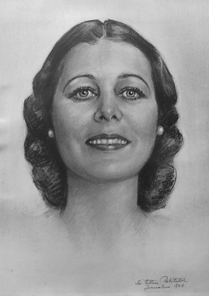
Portrait of Irina Alexandrovna Ovtchinnikova

Ovtchinnikova's influence over Peter steadily increased. She also proved willing to try to appease his family, especially Princess George. In December 1936, she obtained divorce from her second husband. The same month, King Edward VIII of the United Kingdom abdicated in order to marry his own twice divorced foreign lover, the American Wallis Simpson, and Peter disapproved of his conduct.

The pair embarked on a journey to Asia in September 1937, where Peter was going to engage in anthropological research. They arrived in what is now Pakistan in early 1938. Wishing to avoid the Himalayan winter, they moved to South India and spent time with the Toda people. They visited the Nilgiris district, Madras, Kalimpong and finally Ceylon. The pair contracted marriage in a Danish consulate in Madras in September 1939, without informing his family or the Greek government. By marrying Ovtchinnikova his father, Prince George, disowned him.

Prince Peter and Ovtchinnikova returned to Europe in November 1939. The German invasion of France in 1940 led Peter and his wife to leave Paris and move to Assisi, Italy. As tensions between Greece and Italy increased prior to the Greco-Italian War, Peter moved to Athens. Ovtchinnikova was not welcome there, so she took refuge in Istanbul. The Greek government spoiled Peter's plans to have Ovtchinnikova, whom the King considered to be a plotter, evacuated to India and assured that she remained blocked in Istanbul.

The two were eventually reunited in Palestine, and underwent a Greek Orthodox marriage ceremony in Jerusalem on 5 June 1941. They settled in Cairo, where Peter introduced his wife as a Greek princess. This shocked the King, who did not hesitate to inform the diplomatic corps that their marriage was not recognized as dynastic and that Ovtchinnikova was not entitled to the princely dignity. Furthermore, the King placed the couple under surveillance. "The Russian", it was rumored, wished Greece to be Orthodox but Communist and with Peter as king. The pair was well received at the court of King Farouk I and Egyptian high society. Ovtchinnikova used this to involve herself in charities, especially those related to Greek diaspora. The royal family viewed her activities with suspicion, worrying that she might eclipse Princess Paul, wife of the heir presumptive.

=== After the war ===
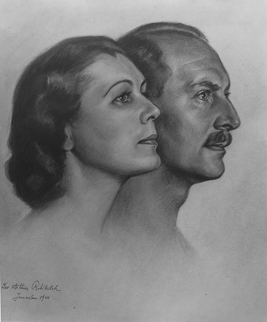
Portrait of Peter and Irina

After the end of the Second World War, Peter and Ovtchinnikova moved to Denmark, but soon moved to the United States in order to raise funds for another Asian expedition. They left the United States in January 1949, travelling from California to Colombo, the capital of Ceylon. They arrived on the island on 16 February and crossed over to India, once again meeting with the Toda people. The pair were unable to enter Tibet or Nepal due to the recent Chinese invasion of Tibet, but Peter managed to study Tibetan refugees who fled to India and Ovtchinnikova assisted him in his research. Ovtchinnikova also occupied herself with the welfare of children and founded several orphanages for Indian and Tibetan children in Bengal.

The expedition ended in 1952, and the pair went to Copenhagen, where Peter presented his findings. The committee wanted him to return and continue his research, which he did within a few weeks. He and his wife were again prohibited from entering Tibet, but this time they also faced the hostility of the Indian government. In 1956, Ovtchinnikova's mother-in-law accepted her invitation to visit them in India; their relationship was improving. In May 1956, the pair received an eviction notice from the Indian government, demanded by China. Ovtchinnikova was then suffering from tuberculosis, and Peter managed to obtain permission for them to stay six more months. They departed in February 1957.

== Separation and widowhood ==
Upon their return to Europe, Prince Peter and Ovtchinnikova settled in the United Kingdom. After the Greek monarchy was abolished in 1973, Prince Peter decided to liquidate his possessions in Greece, most notably his residence in Glyfada. From then on, the pair spent their time in London, Paris and Copenhagen. As the years passed by, their relationship deteriorated. They eventually decided to separate, but not officially to divorce. Ovtchinnikova moved to Hong Kong, where she lived in a vast apartment filled with cats and monkeys, while Peter took up a relationship with a young Englishwoman who lived with him in Copenhagen. Ovtchinnikova was widowed on 15 October 1980. Her in-laws ostracized her at Peter's memorial mass, held at St Sophia's Cathedral, London, on 22 October; no member of the royal family expressed condolence to her. She inherited his enormous wealth, which he in turn had inherited from his mother. She sold her mother-in-law's jewelry in February and died on 13 March 1990. She was buried next to her husband in the grounds of their Danish palace, Lille Bernstorff. On her tomb, "the Russian" is described as "Princess Peter of Greece".
