= Vladimir Ovchinnikov =

Vladimir Ovchinnikov may refer to:

- Vladimir Ovchinnikov (painter) (1911–1978), Soviet-Russian painter, representative of the Leningrad school of painting
- Vladimir Ovchinnikov (pianist) (born 1958), Russian pianist
- Vladimir Ovchinnikov (athlete) (born 1970), Russian javelin thrower
- Vladimir Ovchinnikov (graffiti artist) (1938–2026), Russian painter, ethnographer and social activist
