= Sergei Ovchinnikov =

Sergei Ovchinnikov may refer to:

- Sergei Ovchinnikov (volleyball) (1969–2012), Russian volleyball coach
- Sergei Ovchinnikov (footballer, born 1970), manager and former association football goalkeeper who played for the Russian national team
- Sergei Ovchinnikov (footballer, born 1984), Russian footballer
