= Vsevolod Ovchinnikov =

Soviet writer (1926–2021)

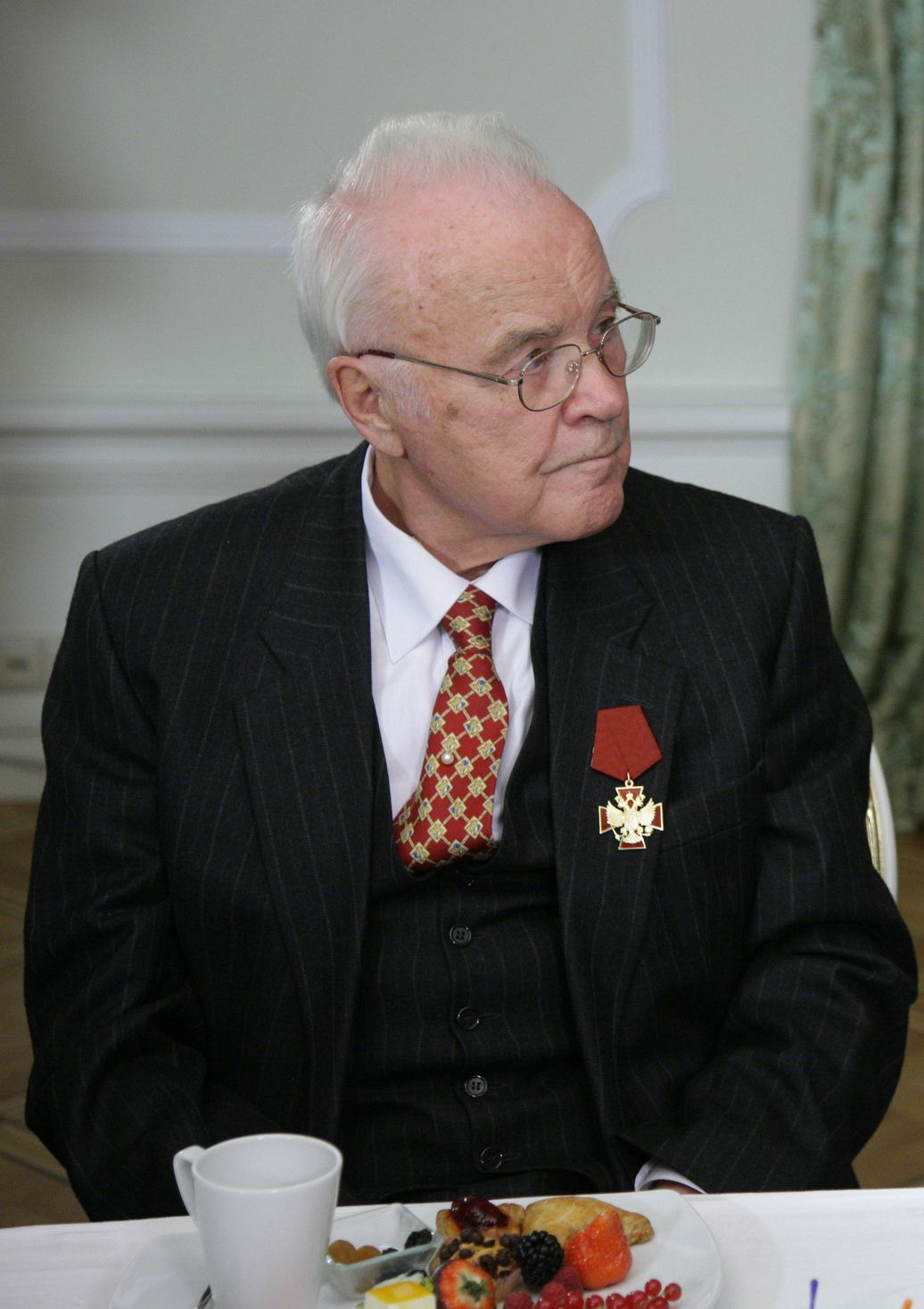
- Ovchinnikov in 2010
- Born: Vsevolod Vladimirovich Ovchinnikov; November 17, 1926; Leningrad, RSFSR, Soviet Union
- Died: August 30, 2021 (aged 94); Moscow, Russia
- Years active: 1951–2021

Vsevolod Vladimirovich Ovchinnikov (Russian: Все́волод Влади́мирович Овчи́нников; November 17, 1926 – August 30, 2021) was a Soviet and Russian journalist and writer-publicist, one of the leading Soviet postwar international journalists; orientalist and expert on Japan and China.

Ovchinnikov was born in Leningrad. For nearly forty years he was a correspondent and political columnist for Pravda, and was a columnist in the Rossiyskaya Gazeta.

Author of books A Branch of Sakura (The Story of What Kind of People the Japanese) (1970), Roots of Oak (Impressions and Thoughts about England and the English) (1980), Hot Ashes (Chronicle of a Secret Race for the Possession of Nuclear Weapons). For these books in 1985 he was awarded the USSR State Prize.

He was an honorary member of the Russian-Japanese Committee of the 21st century, the political expert peer network Kremlin.org.

From 1953 to 1960 he worked as a special correspondent of Pravda in China, from 1962 to 1968 - in Japan, from 1974 to 1978 - in the UK.

In addition, there are short-term missions in the United States, Nicaragua, Mexico, Indonesia, and India. Reports from these countries are united in the book The Element of Race.

Ovchinnikov twice traveled to Tibet (1955, 1990).

Reports and essays Ovchinnikov devoted mainly to social, political and economic problems around the world - the trade union movement, the national liberation struggle, relations with developing countries by transnational corporations, humanitarian issues.

Ovchinnikov had the opportunity of the first Russians to put flowers on the grave of Richard Sorge.
