= Andrei Ovchinnikov (footballer) =

Russian footballer

Personal information
- Full name: Andrei Aleksandrovich Ovchinnikov
- Date of birth: 17 November 1986 (age 39)
- Place of birth: Plavitsa, Lipetsk Oblast, Russian SFSR
- Height: 1.78 m (5 ft 10 in)
- Positions: Midfielder; striker

Senior career*
Years	Team	Apps	(Gls)
2005	FC Metallurg-2 Lipetsk		
2005–2007	FC Metallurg Lipetsk	29	(1)
2008	FC Spartak Tambov	31	(8)
2009–2022	FC Metallurg Lipetsk	296	(53)
- * Club domestic league appearances and goals

Andrei Aleksandrovich Ovchinnikov (Russian: Андрей Александрович Овчинников; born 17 November 1986) is a Russian former professional football player.

== Club career ==
He made his Russian Football National League debut for FC Metallurg Lipetsk on 3 November 2005 in a game against FC Avangard Kursk. Ovchinnikov is an important player for Metallurg.
