= Roland Bonaparte =

French geographer, astronomer and anthropologist (1858–1924)

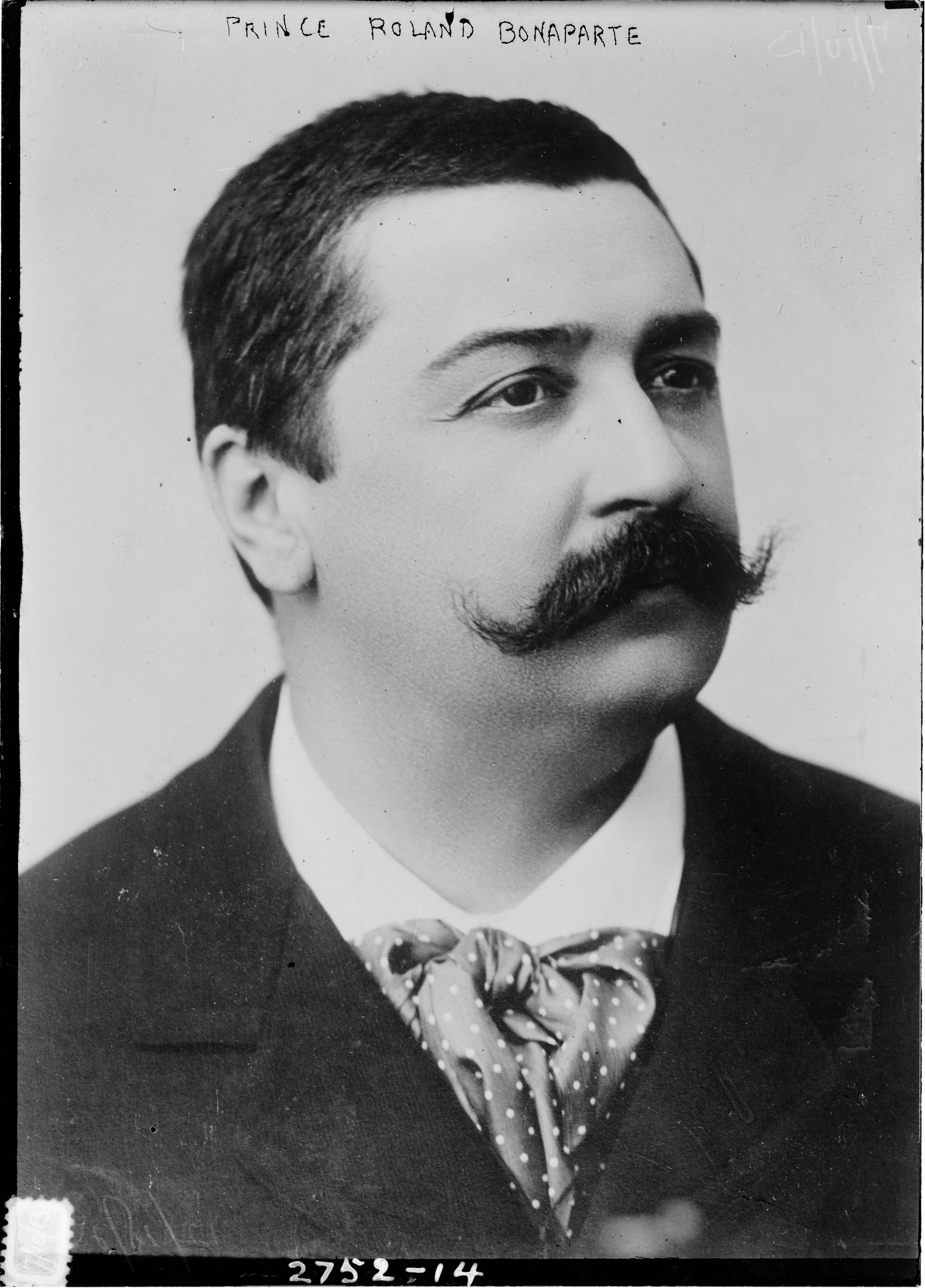

6th Prince of Canino and Musignano
- Reign: 11 February 1899 – 14 April 1924
- Predecessor: Napoléon Charles
- Born: 19 May 1858; Paris, France
- Died: 14 April 1924 (aged 65); Paris, France
- Burial: Cimetière des Gonards
- Spouse: Marie-Félix Blanc (m. 1880; died 1882)
- Issue: Marie, Princess George of Greece and Denmark
Names
- Roland Napoléon Bonaparte
- House: Bonaparte
- Father: Prince Pierre Napoléon Bonaparte
- Mother: Éléonore-Justine Ruflin

Roland Napoléon Bonaparte, 6th Prince of Canino and Musignano (19 May 1858 – 14 April 1924) was a French prince and president of the Société de Géographie from 1910 until his death. He was the last male-lineage descendant of Lucien Bonaparte, the genetically senior branch of the family since 1844.

== Biography ==
Bonaparte was born in Paris on 19 May 1858, the son of Prince Pierre Napoleon Bonaparte and Éléonore-Justine Ruflin. He was a grandson of Lucien Bonaparte, Emperor Napoleon I's brother.

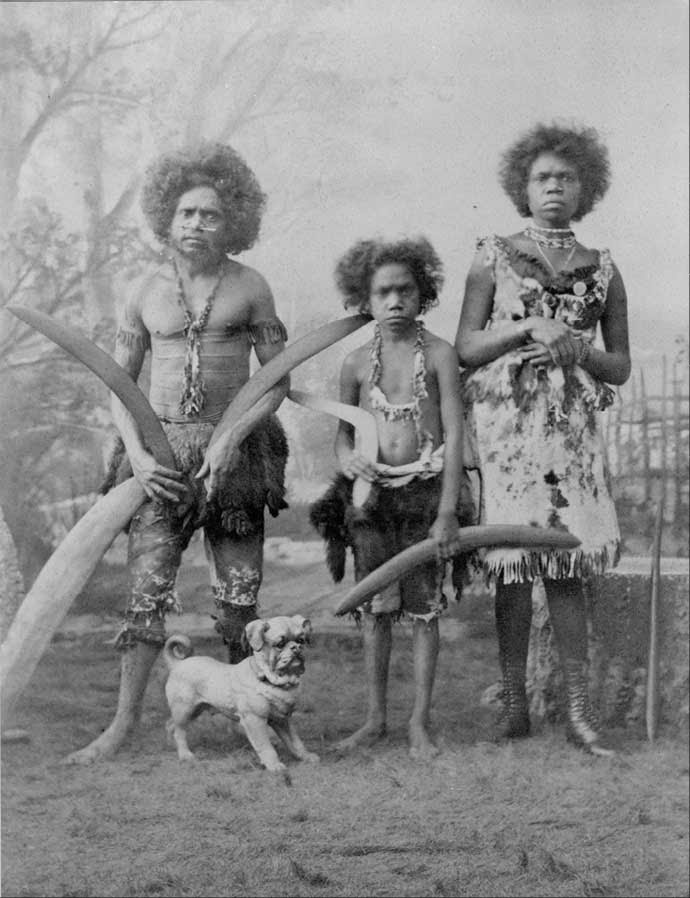
Three Aboriginal Australians from 1885 in Paris by Bonaparte

Prince Roland was married in Paris on 18 November 1880, to Marie-Félix Blanc (1859–1882), the daughter of François Blanc, who reportedly bought a dowry worth 8,400,000 francs to her husband, as well as a reversionary right to a further 6,000,000 francs which she would receive after her mother's death. They had one daughter, Marie Bonaparte (1882–1962).

In 1884, Bonaparte was part of a scientific expedition that photographed and anatomically measured the Sami inhabitants of Northern Norway. The following year he was photographing Aboriginal Australians brought to Europe and the US to be studied by anthropologists and exhibited by the general public.

Bonaparte was elected an International Member of the American Philosophical Society in 1895.

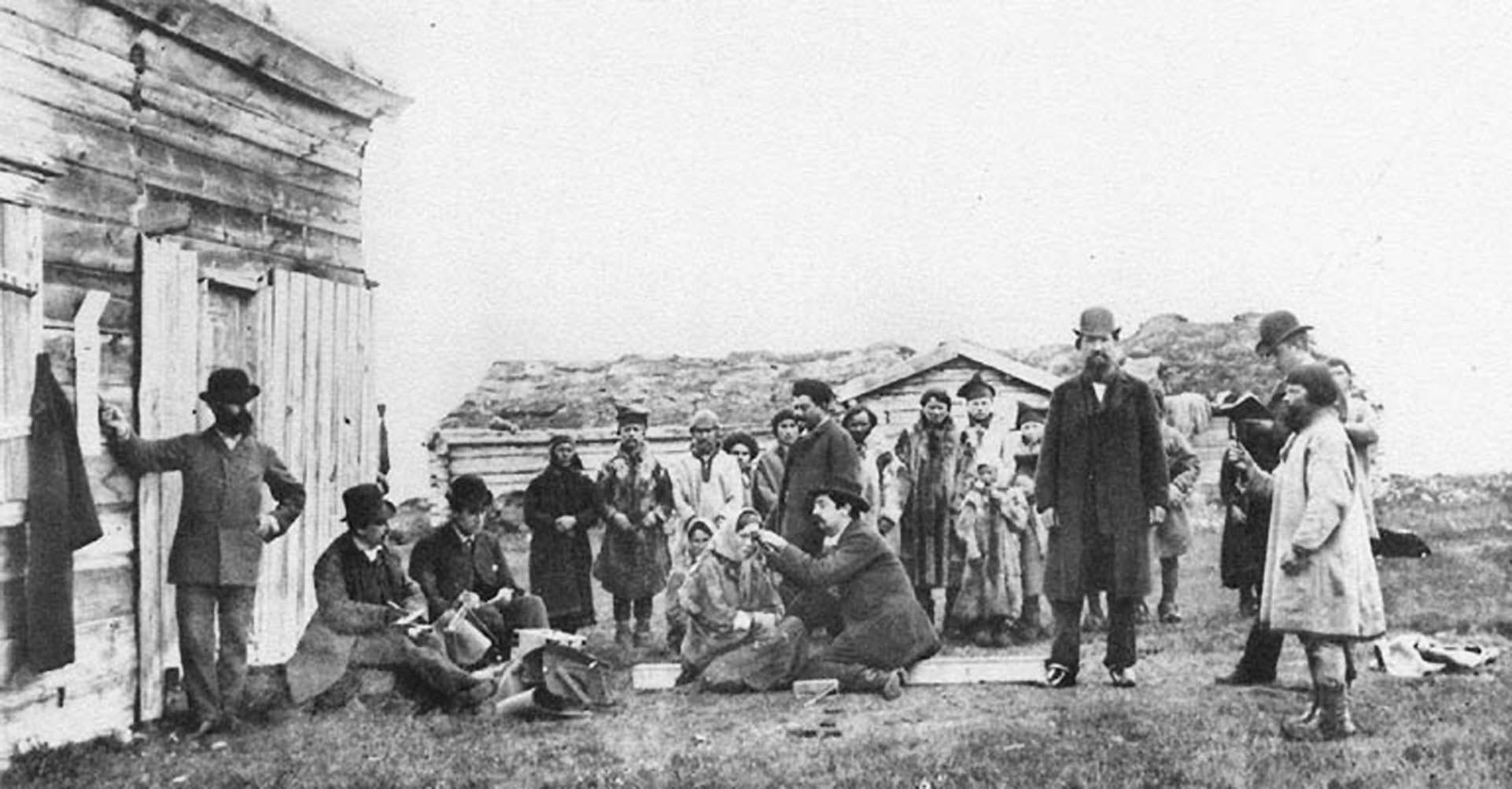
Bonaparte in center measuring a Sami woman's head

Bonaparte was the President of the Société astronomique de France (SAF), the French astronomical society, from 1921 to 1923.

On the death of his cousin Prince Napoléon Charles Bonaparte in 1899, he succeeded him as the 6th Prince of Canino and Musignano, but he never assumed the title. With Prince Roland's death in Paris on 14 April 1924, the senior line of the House of Bonaparte descending from Lucien Bonaparte became extinct in the male line. He is buried in Les Gonards Cemetery in Versailles, France.

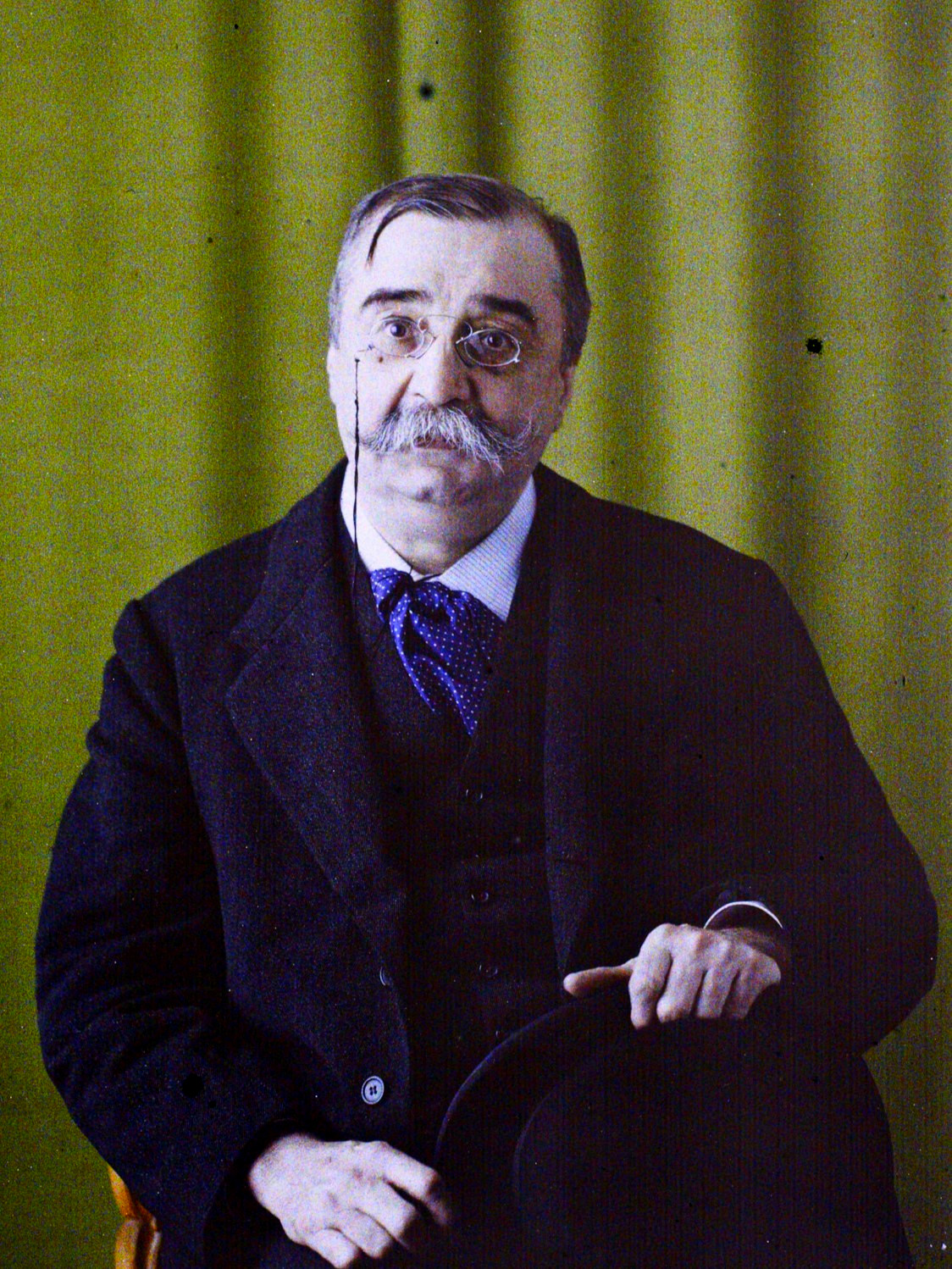
Autochrome portrait by Auguste Léon, 1921

== Legacy ==
Bonaparte Point in Antarctica was named after him by Jean-Baptiste Charcot. There is also a small lake on the mountains above the Coast Sámi/Norwegian village of Kvalsund which is called Bonapartesjøen (lit. 'Lake Bonaparte') after his abovementioned visit to the region.

Roland Bonaparte House of Bonaparte Born: 19 May 1858 Died: 14 April 1924
Preceded by Ernest-Théodore Hamy	President of the Société de Géographie; 1910–1924	Succeeded by Henri Cordier
Titles of nobility
Preceded by Napoléon Charles Bonaparte	Prince of Canino and Musignano; 1899–1924	Title extinct
