= Camille Blanc =

French municipal leader

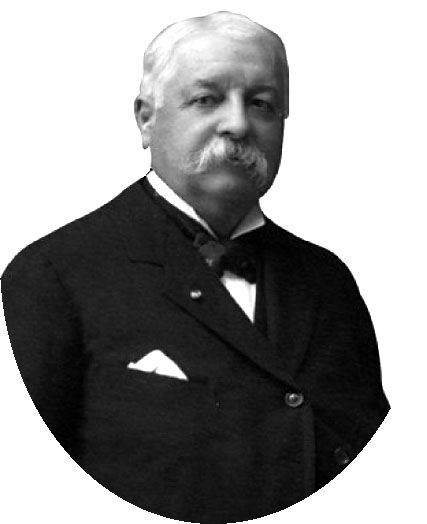
Blanc c. 1915

Camille Blanc (French: [kamij blɑ̃]; March 29, 1847, in Paris – December 21, 1927) was a French municipal leader, with many interests in Monaco. From 1904 to 1925, he was founding mayor of Beausoleil, a town adjacent to Monte Carlo, which had previously formed part of La Turbie and had been known as Monte-Carlo-Supérieur.

== President of the Société-des-Bains-de-Mer ==
Blanc was also for many years president of the Société des bains de mer de Monaco, of Monte Carlo, and took a leading part in the administration of the Monte Carlo Casino.

=== Persona non grata in Monaco ===
In the later years of his administration of Monte Carlo Casino, his relations with Louis II, Prince of Monaco, suffered a setback, and he withdrew to France as someone who had become persona non grata in Monaco's official circles.

While married to Elisabeth Lanxade, his name was also linked to Madame Chinon, whose excessive gambling habits, indulged by Blanc, were widely believed by some observers to be substantially at the origins of the accusations of mismanagement which eventually led to Prince Louis' intervention and termination of his position at Monte Carlo Casino.

In the closing years of Blanc's life, up to his death in 1927, he suffered severely from paralysis, said to have been derived mainly from the reported stresses of his experience of dealing with the Monaco authorities.

== Legacy ==
The separate existence and prosperity of the neighbouring French town of Beausoleil may be Blanc's principal lasting legacy. The town hall of Beausoleil in the rue de la République has a sculpture and gardens dedicated to the memory of Camille Blanc.
