= Paris uprising =

Paris uprising may refer to:

- 1832 Paris uprising
- 1870 Paris uprising
- January 1871 Paris uprising
- Paris Commune
- 1944 Paris uprising
