= Ulric de Fonvielle =

French journalist and writer (1833–1911)

- Map of the Second Battle of Bull Run drawn up by Sydney Stengel and Ulric de Fonvielle, 29–30 August 1862
- Born: 11 February 1833; Paris
- Died: 1 July 1911 (aged 78); Paris
- Occupations: Journalist; Writer

Ulric de Fonvielle, brother of Wilfrid de Fonvielle, (11 February 1833, Paris – 1 July 1911, Paris) was a 19th-century French journalist and writer.

== Biography ==
After studying painting, he was as a volunteer part of the expedition of the Thousand in 1860 then, as a reporter, of the American Civil War.

Chief editor of La Ligne Directe in Dieppe (1868), he actively participated to the campaign against the Empire led by La Marseillaise of Henri Rochefort. On January 10, 1870, he was chosen as a witness by their colleague Paschal Grousset for Victor Noir to attend the duel between Noir and Prince Pierre Bonaparte and accused the Prince of attempted murder on his person after the death of Victor Noir: Assassin, dare to face me! You cowardly murdered my friend, assassin, assassin! To death ! He then got ten days in jail for insulting the Court.

In April 1870, he was candidate to the Paris Commune.

== Works ==
- 1861: Souvenirs d'une chemise rouge
- 1865: Lincoln, 1806-1865
- 1878: Populus, drama in five acts and huit tableaux, with Eugène Hubert
- 1879: Le Puits du diable

== Bibliography ==
- Jules Claretie, Histoire de la révolution de 1870-71, 1872, read online on Gallica
