= Éléonore-Justine Ruflin =

French princess (1832–1905)

Princess Éléonore-Justine Bonaparte
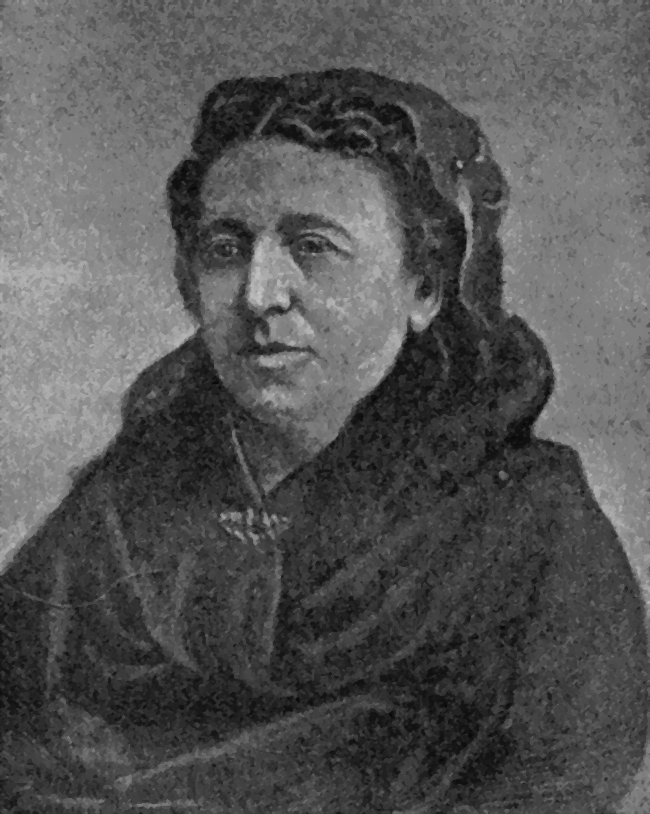
- Born: Éléonore-Justine Ruflin; 1 July 1832; Paris, Kingdom of France
- Died: 13 October 1905 (aged 73); Paris, French Third Republic
- Burial: Cimetière des Gonards
- Spouse: Prince Pierre-Napoléon Bonaparte (m. 1852; died 1881)
- Issue: Prince Roland Bonaparte; Princess Jeanne, Marquise de Villeneuve-Escaplon
- House: Bonaparte (by marriage)
- Father: Julien Ruflin
- Mother: Justine Bucard

Princess Éléonore-Justine Bonaparte (née Éléonore-Justine Ruflin; 1 July 1832 – 13 October 1905) was the wife of Prince Pierre-Napoléon Bonaparte, a nephew of Napoleon I. Under the pseudonym Nina Bonaparte, she published a memoir titled History of My Life. As she was from a peasant background, her morganatic marriage to Prince Pierre-Napoléon, although recognized by the Catholic Church, was not accepted by Pierre's cousin Napoleon III and the House of Bonaparte and did not receive civil legitimacy until the fall of the Second French Empire.

== Early life and family ==
Éléonore-Justine Ruflin was born on 1 July 1832 in Paris. She was the daughter of Julien Ruflin, a foundry worker, and his wife Justine Bucard, both from peasantry. She had a sister named Elisa.

== Marriage and issue ==
In 1852 Ruflin married Prince Pierre-Napoléon Bonaparte in a Catholic ceremony at Calvi, Haute-Corse. Her husband was the son of Lucien Bonaparte, 1st Prince of Canino and Musignano and Alexandrine de Bleschamp and a nephew of Napoleon I of France. The House of Bonaparte did not approve of the marriage due to Ruflin's social class, and prevented a civil union from occurring until the fall of the Second French Empire.

She had five children, only two of whom survived:

- Prince Roland Bonaparte (1858-1924) married Marie-Félix Blanc
- Princess Jeanne Bonaparte (1861-1910), married Christian, Marquise de Villeneuve-Escaplon

Ruflin was the grandmother of Princess Marie Bonaparte and helped raise her after her mother, Marie-Félix Blanc, died in 1882.

== Later life ==
Ruflin and her husband moved from Corsica to Paris. After her husband killed Victor Noir in a duel, the family took refuge at the Abbaye Notre-Dame d'Orval in Belgium. After her husband had a string of affairs, Ruflin moved to the United Kingdom and opened a fashion boutique in London. Her business was unsuccessful, and she returned to Paris with her children. Back in France, she orchestrated the marriages of her son to Marie-Félix Blanc, an heiress, and her daughter to Christian de Villeneuve-Esclapon, a nobleman.

She published a memoir titled History of My Life under the pseudonym Nina Bonaparte. She was interested in politics and was a critic of Alfred Dreyfus.

== Death ==
In the summer of 1905, Ruflin suffered from angina pectoris. She died on 13 October 1905 at her grandson's mansion in Paris and was buried in the Cimetière des Gonards.
