= Gustave Flourens =

French revolutionary and writer (1838–1871)

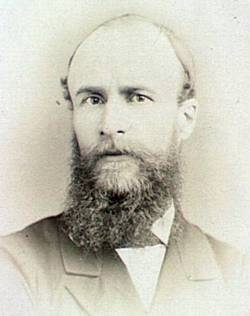
Gustave Flourens

Gustave Flourens (4 August 1838 in Paris – 3 April 1871) was a French Revolutionary leader and writer, son of the physiologist Jean Pierre Flourens (who was Professor at the Collège de France and deputy in 1838-1839). He was also the elder brother of Émile Flourens, who became minister of foreign affairs under the Third Republic.

At 25 years of age Flourens undertook in 1863, on behalf of his father, a course of lectures at the Collège de France, on the subject of the history of humankind. His theories as to the manifold origin of the human race gave offence to the clergy, and he was prevented from delivering further lectures. He then went to Brussels, where he published his lectures under the title of Histoire de l'homme (1863). Gustave Flourens then visited Constantinople and Athens and took part in the Cretan insurrection of 1866-1868; he was one of those chosen for a difficult mission to Athens on behalf of the Cretan Revolutionary Assembly. He attempted to convince influential people, such as Victor Hugo, to support the Cretan insurrection. Gustave Flourens then spent some time in Italy, where an article of his in the Fe polo d'Italia caused his arrest and imprisonment, and finally, having returned to France, nearly lost his life in a duel with Paul de Cassagnac, editor of the Pays.

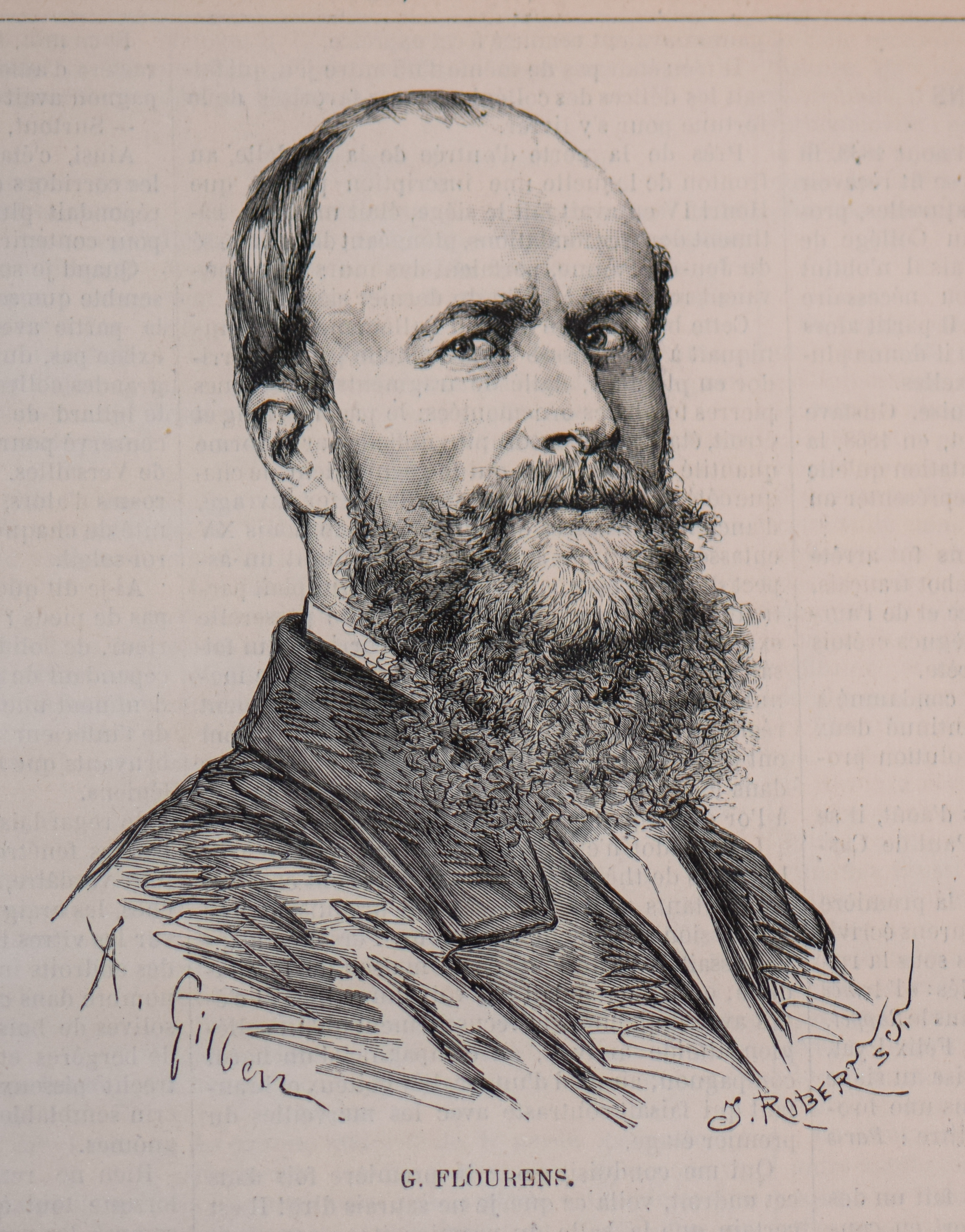
Gustave Flourens, revolutionary of the Paris Commune

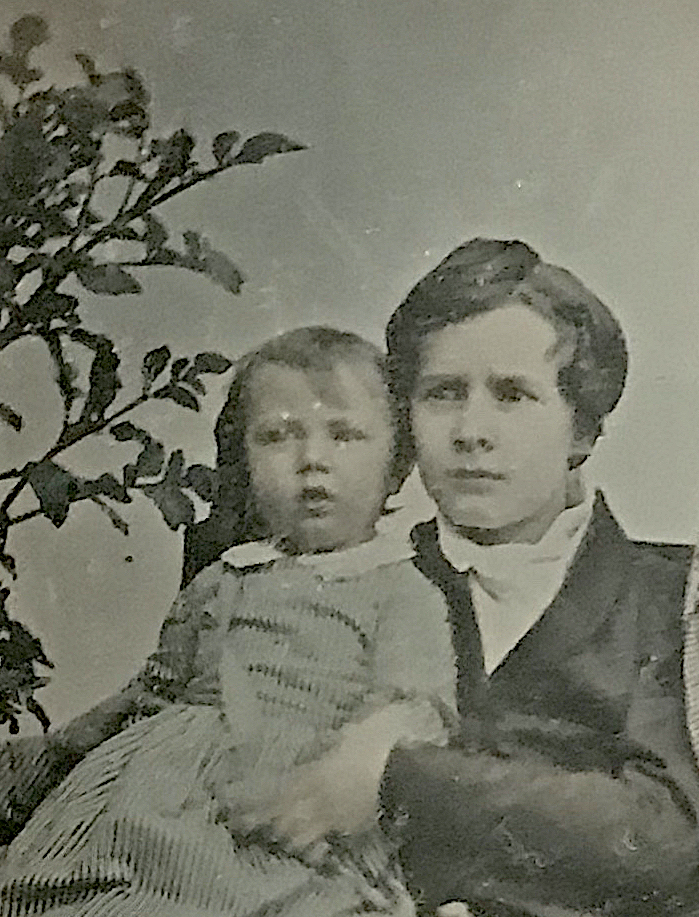
Gustave Flourens as a teenager, with young brother, daguerreotype by Derussy, c. 1849

In Paris he devoted his time to the cause of "red republicanism", and begin writing articles in the La Marseillaise weekly newspaper. At length, having failed in an attempt to organize a revolution at Belleville on 7 February 1870, was compelled to flee from France. Returning to Paris on the downfall of Napoleon III, placed himself at the head of a body of 500 tirailleurs (sharpshooters).

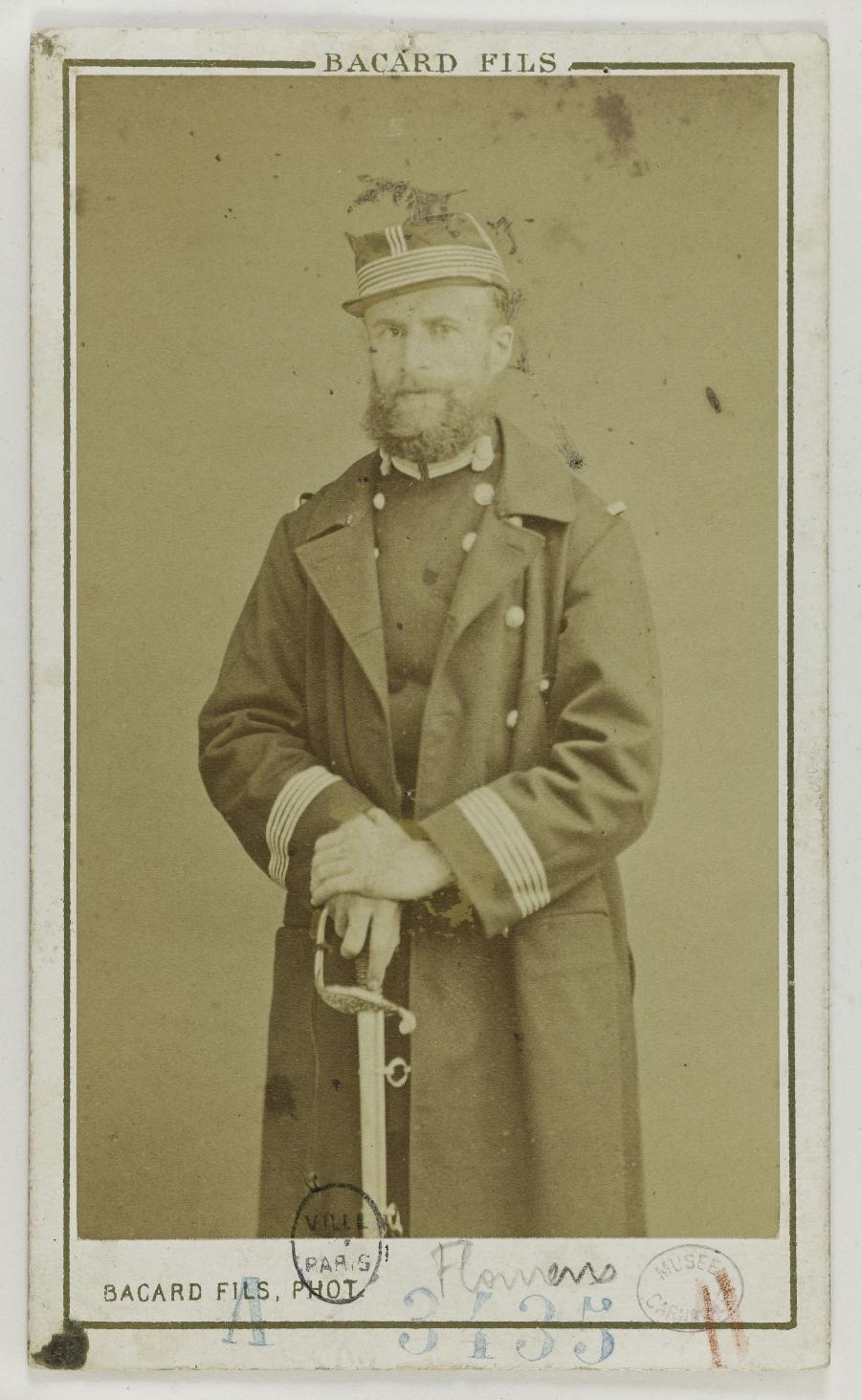
Flourens in military uniform, 1871

Because of his insurrectionary proceedings (he was one of the organizers of the October 1870 uprising against the provisional government's moderate policy) he was taken prisoner at Créteil, near Vincennes, by the provisional government, and confined at Mazas on 7 December 1870, but was released by his men on the night of 21–22 January. On 18 March he joined the population's uprising, was elected a member of the revolutionary Commune by the 20th arrondissement, and was named general. Gustave Flourens was one of the most active leaders of the insurrection, and after a sortie against the Versailles troops in the morning of 3 April, he fled into an inn near the bridge that separates Chatou and Rueil. There, after he was captured and disarmed by the Gendarmerie, he was murdered by Captain Jean-Marc Démaret. Besides his Science de l'homme (Paris, 1869), Flourens was also the author of numerous fugitive pamphlets.

== Possible influence on Jules Verne ==
In his notes to modern editions of some of Jules Verne's works William Butcher, citing the Sunday Times of 5 March 1978, has suggested that one of Verne's most famous characters, Captain Nemo, is based on Gustave Flourens. This view has been challenged by Leonidas Kallivretakis.

== Friendship with Sarah Bernhardt ==
In her autobiography, My Double Life (p. 220), the actress Sarah Bernhardt described him as follows:

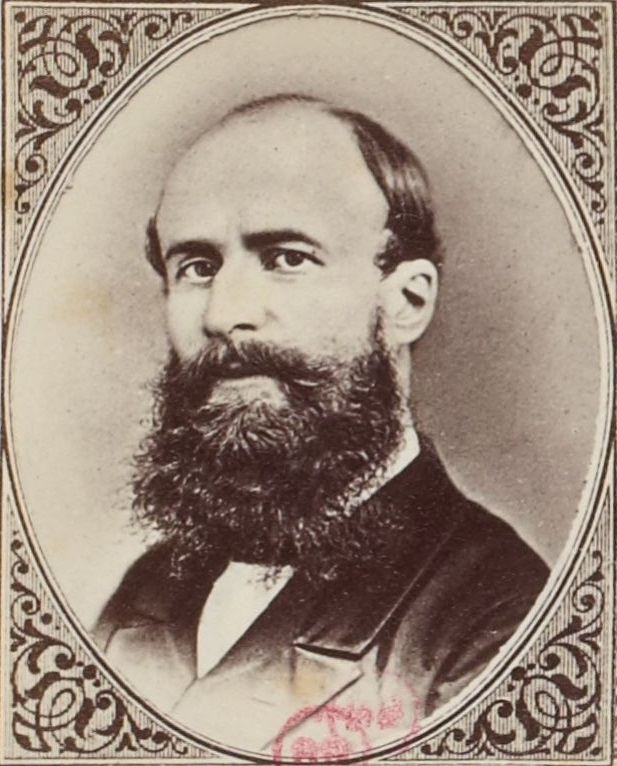

"I also knew and frequently saw a mad sort of fellow, full of dreams and Utopian follies. His name was Flourens, and he was tall and nice-looking. He wanted every one to be happy and every one to have money, and he shot down the soldiers without reflecting that he was commencing by making one or more of them unhappy. Reasoning with him was impossible, but he was charming and brave. I saw him two days before his death. He came to see me with a very young girl who wanted to devote herself to dramatic art. I promised him to help her. Two days later the poor child came to tell me of the heroic death of Flourens. He had refused to surrender, and, stretching out his arms, had shouted to the hesitating soldiers, 'Shoot, shoot! I should not have spared you!' And their bullets killed him."

== See also ==
- Paris Commune
- France in the nineteenth century
