= Christian de Villeneuve-Esclapon =

French aristocrat, politician and Félibrige supporter

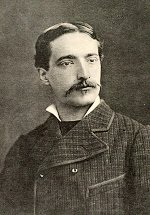
- Born: 8 August 1852; Aix-en-Provence, Bouches-du-Rhône, Provence-Alpes-Côte d'Azur, France
- Died: 3 April 1931 (aged 78); Paris, France
- Occupations: Politician; Publisher
- Spouse: Jeanne Bonaparte
- Children: Jules Pierre Napoléon de Villeneuve-Esclapon; Henriette Marie Jeanne de Villeneuve-Esclapon; Romée Napoléon de Villeneuve-Esclapon; Lucien Louis Napoléon de Villeneuve-Esclapon; Marie Roselyne de Villeneuve-Esclapon; Rolande Anne Mathilde de Villeneuve-Esclapon
- Parent(s): Jules de Villeneuve-Esclapon; Henriette de Fresse de Monval
- Relatives: Pierre Napoléon Bonaparte (father-in-law)

Christian de Villeneuve-Esclapon (1852–1931) was a French aristocrat, politician and Félibrige supporter. He served in the National Assembly of France from 1889 to 1893 and published a newspaper called Lou Prouvençau.

== Biography ==
=== Early life ===
Henri Marie Christian de Villeneuve-Esclapon was born on 8 August 1852 in Aix-en-Provence. His father was Jules de Villeneuve-Esclapon (1809–1895) and his mother, Henriette de Fresse de Monval. Upon the death of his father, he became the 10th Marquis de Villeneuve-Esclapon.

=== Career ===
He served in the Third Carlist War of 1872–1876 under Carlos, Duke of Madrid (1848–1909).

He embarked upon a career in politics by working as the private secretary of Achille de Vallavieille, the Prefect of Hérault. He then served as a member of the National Assembly of France for Corsica from 6 October 1889 to 14 October 1893.

He was a supporter of Félibrige, and started a newspaper in Aix-en-Provence, Lou Prouvençau. He also served as editor-in-charge of Occitania and wrote articles in Souleiado. Additionally, he wrote about Théodore Aubanel (1829–1886), Romée de Villeneuve (1170–1250) and the Château de Vaugrenier in Villeneuve-Loubet.

=== Personal life ===
He married Princess Jeanne Bonaparte (1861–1910), daughter of Prince Pierre Napoléon Bonaparte (1815–1881) and Éléonore-Justine Ruflin, and a great-niece of Napoleon (1769–1821). They had six children:

- Jules Pierre Napoléon de Villeneuve-Esclapon (1886–1957). He married Cécile Ernestine Marie de Courtois (1896–1981).
- Henriette Marie Jeanne de Villeneuve-Esclapon (1887–1942). She married Lucien Leret d'Aubigny (1876–1945).
- Romée Napoléon de Villeneuve-Esclapon (1889–1944).
- Lucien Louis Napoléon de Villeneuve-Esclapon (1890–1939). He married Iskouhi-Gladys Matossian (1894–1951).
- Marie Roselyne de Villeneuve-Esclapon (1893–1973). She married Bruno de Maigret (1888–1966).
- Rolande Anne Mathilde de Villeneuve-Esclapon (1896–1972). She married Antoine de Lyée de Belleau (1898–1978).

He died on 3 April 1931 in Paris.

== Bibliography ==
- Lei Jue flourau de Fourcauquié, 13 de setèmbre 1875 (14 pages, Ricateau, Hamelin et Cie, 1875).
- La Félibrejade de la Sainte-Étoile à Avignon (15 pages, Vve Remondet-Aubin, 1876).
- La Première représentation du Pain du péché ("lou Pan dou pecat"), drame provençal en 5 actes et en vers, de Théodore Aubanel (22 pages, Vve Remondet-Aubin, 1878).
- La Maison des Baux (8 pages, L. Duc, 1895).
- Romée de Villeneuve, étude historique (25 pages, Neuilley, 1899).
- La Fondation du château de Villeneuve-Loubet (52 pages, Neuilley, 1902).
