= Pierre Napoléon Bonaparte =

French nobleman, revolutionary, and politician

Pierre Napoleon Bonaparte
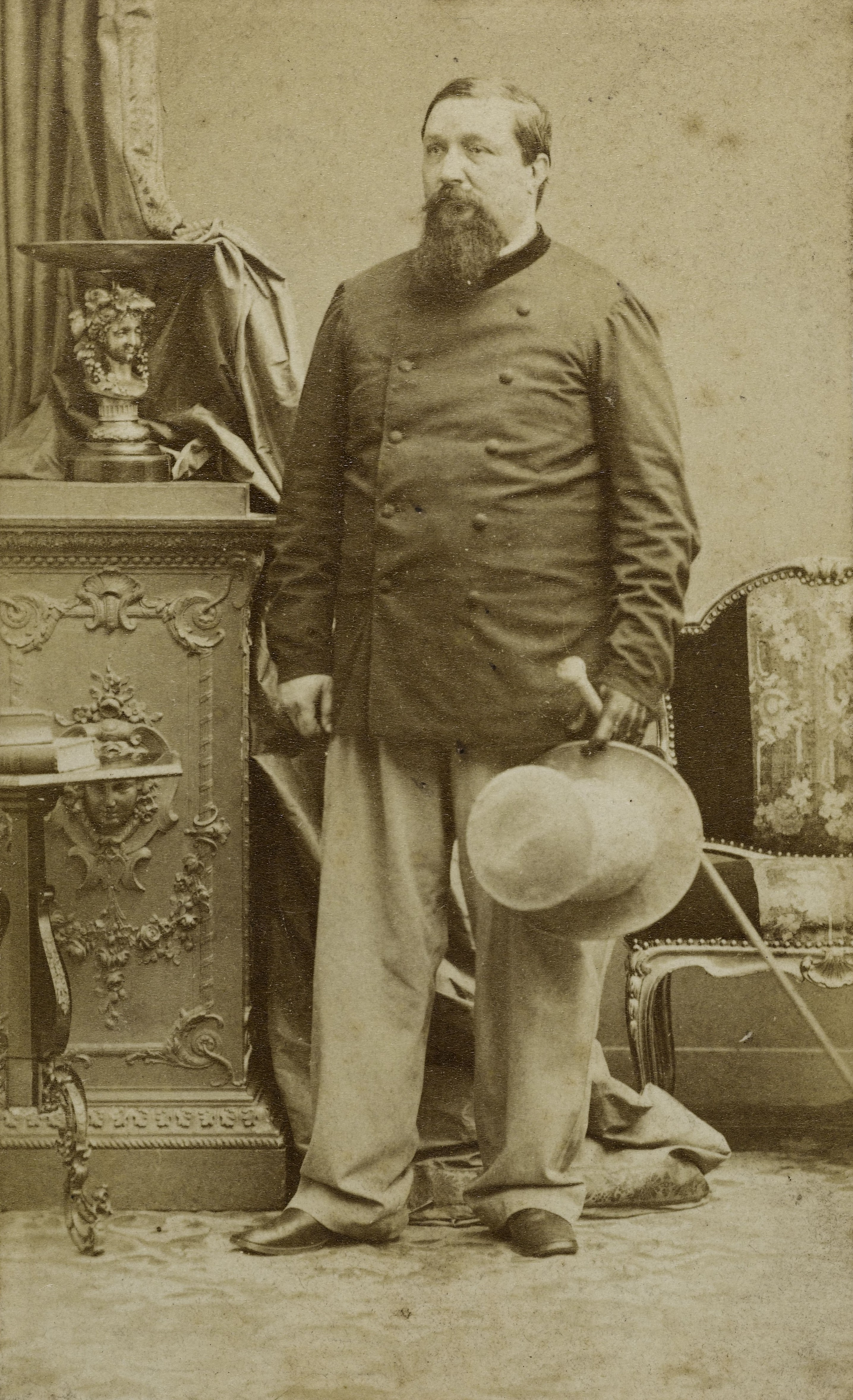
- Born: 11 October 1815; Rome, Papal States (now Italy)
- Died: 7 April 1881 (aged 65); Versailles, France
- Burial: Cimetière des Gonards, Versailles, France
- Spouse: Éléonore-Justine Ruflin (m. 1852)
- Issue: Roland Napoleon Bonaparte; Jeanne, Marquise de Villeneuve-Escaplon
- House: Bonaparte
- Father: Lucien Bonaparte
- Mother: Alexandrine de Bleschamp

Prince Pierre-Napoléon Bonaparte (11 October 1815 – 7 April 1881) was a French nobleman, revolutionary and politician, the son of Lucien Bonaparte and his second wife Alexandrine de Bleschamp. He was a nephew of Napoleon I, Joseph Bonaparte, Elisa Bonaparte, Louis Bonaparte, Pauline Bonaparte, Caroline Bonaparte and Jérôme Bonaparte.

== Biography ==
Bonaparte was born in Rome, Italy.

He joined the insurrectionary bands in Romagna (1830–1831); later he moved to the United States, where he went to join his uncle Joseph, and in Colombia with Francisco de Paula Santander (1832). Returning to Rome he was taken prisoner by order of Pope Gregory XVI (1835–1836). He finally took refuge in the United Kingdom of Great Britain and Ireland.

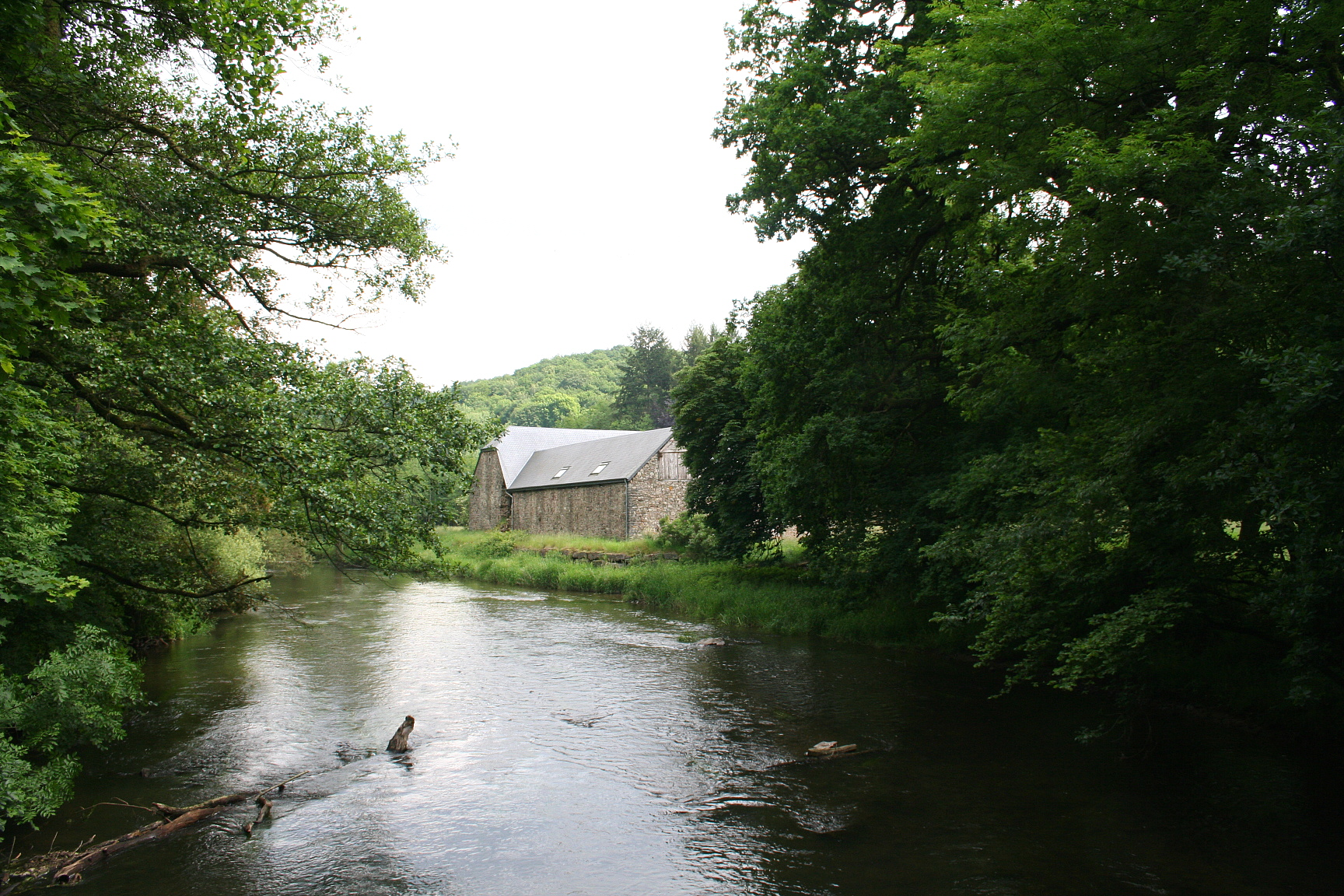
Daverdisse, the Lesse river and the Mohimont Farm.

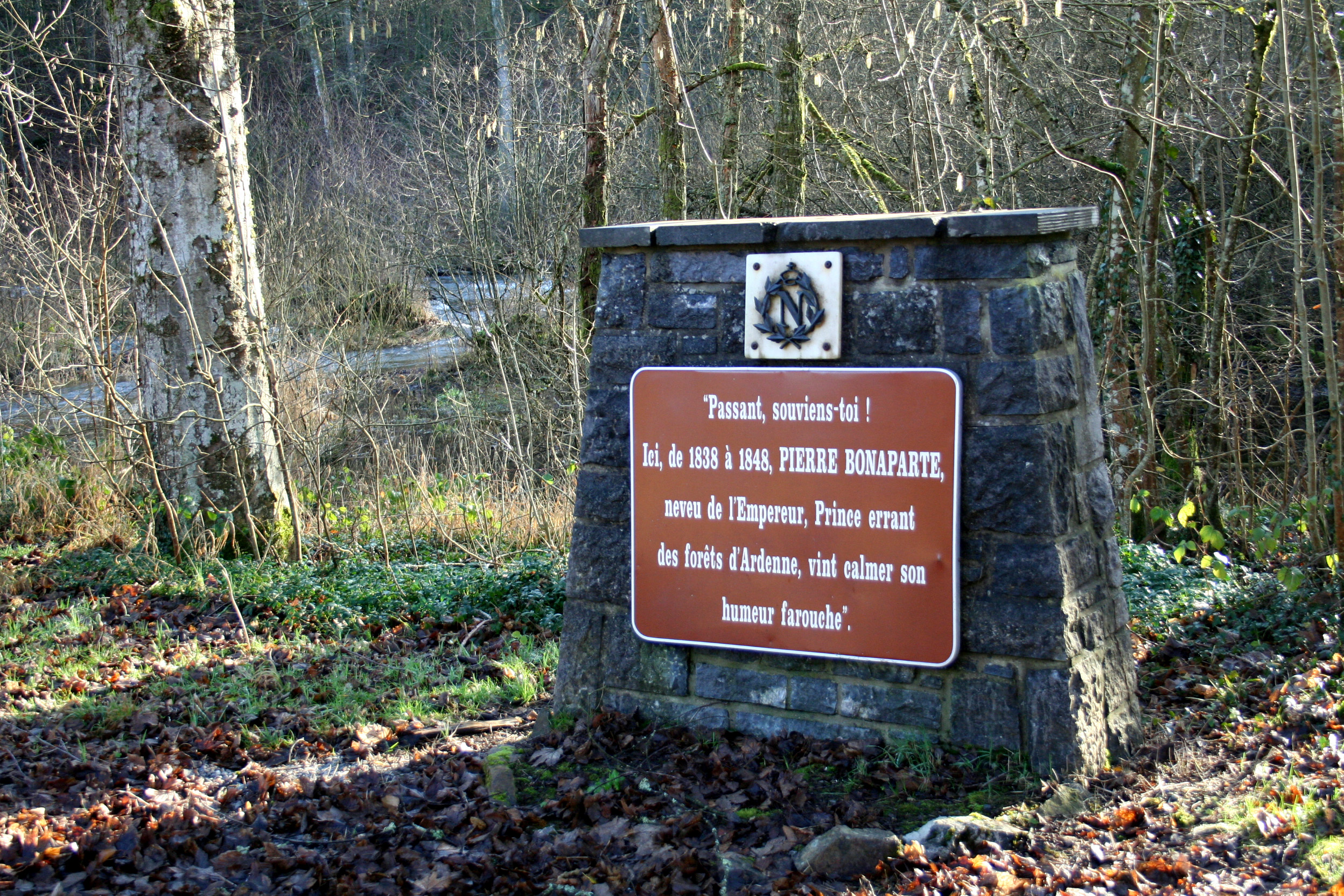
Daverdisse, memorial plate dedicated to Pierre Napoléon Bonaparte.

At the revolution of 1848 he returned to France and was elected deputy for Corsica to the Constituent Assembly. He declared himself an out-and-out republican and even voted with the socialists. He pronounced himself in favour of the national workshops and against the loi Falloux. His attitude contributed greatly to give popular confidence to his cousin Louis Napoleon (Napoleon III of France), of whose coup d'état on 2 December 1851 he disapproved; but he was soon reconciled to the emperor, and accepted the title of prince. The republicans at once abandoned him.

From that time on he led a debauched life, and lost all political importance.

=== Background to shooting ===
In December 1869, a dispute broke out between two Corsican newspapers, the leftist La Revanche and the loyalist L'Avenir de la Corse, edited by Jean de la Rocca (1832 – 1883). The invective of La Revanche concentrated on Napoleon I. On 30 December, L'Avenir published a letter sent to its editor by Prince Pierre Bonaparte, the nephew of Napoleon I, and cousin of the then-ruling Emperor Napoleon III. Prince Bonaparte castigated the staff of La Revanche as beggars and traitors. Paschal Grousset, the editor of both La Revanche and La Marseillaise, a Parisian radical socialist newspaper, took offence and demanded satisfaction.

On 9 January 1870, Prince Bonaparte wrote a letter to Henri Rochefort, the founder of La Marseillaise, claiming to uphold the good name of his family:

After having outraged each of my relatives, you insult me through the pen of one of your menials. My turn had to come. Only I have an advantage over others of my name, of being a private individual, while being a Bonaparte... I therefore ask you whether your inkpot is guaranteed by your breast... I live, not in a palace, but at 59, rue d'Auteuil. I promise to you that if you present yourself, you will not be told that I left.

=== Shooting ===
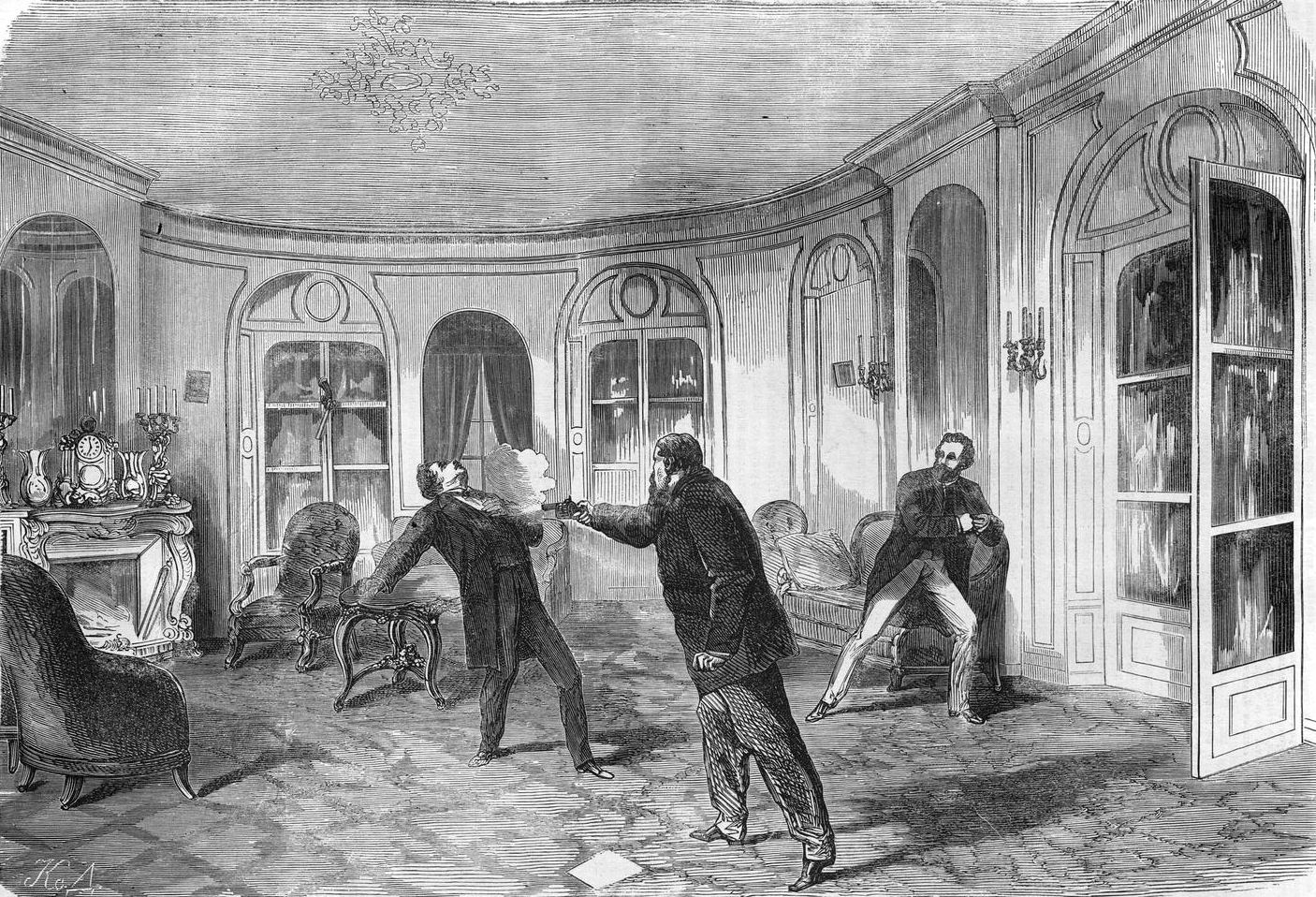
Pierre Bonaparte shoots Victor Noir. From left to right: Victor Noir, Pierre Bonaparte, Ulrich de Fonvielle.

On the following day, Grousset sent Victor Noir and Ulric de Fonvielle as his seconds to fix the terms of a duel with Pierre Bonaparte. Contrary to custom, they presented themselves to Bonaparte instead of contacting his seconds. Each of them carried a revolver in his pocket. Noir and de Fonvieille presented Bonaparte with a letter signed by Grousset. But the prince declined the challenge, asserting his willingness to fight Rochefort, but not his "menials" (ses manœuvres). In response, Noir asserted his solidarity with his friends. According to Fonvieille, Bonaparte then slapped his face and shot Noir dead. According to Bonaparte, it was Noir who took umbrage at the epithet and struck him first, whereupon he drew his revolver and fired at his aggressor. That was the version eventually accepted by the court.

In the trial of Bonaparte for homicide on 21 May 1871 Théodore Grandperret served as Attorney General at the High Court convened in Tours. His evident bias towards the Bonaparte family caused the lawyers of the Noir family to be called the "defense lawyers".

== Family ==
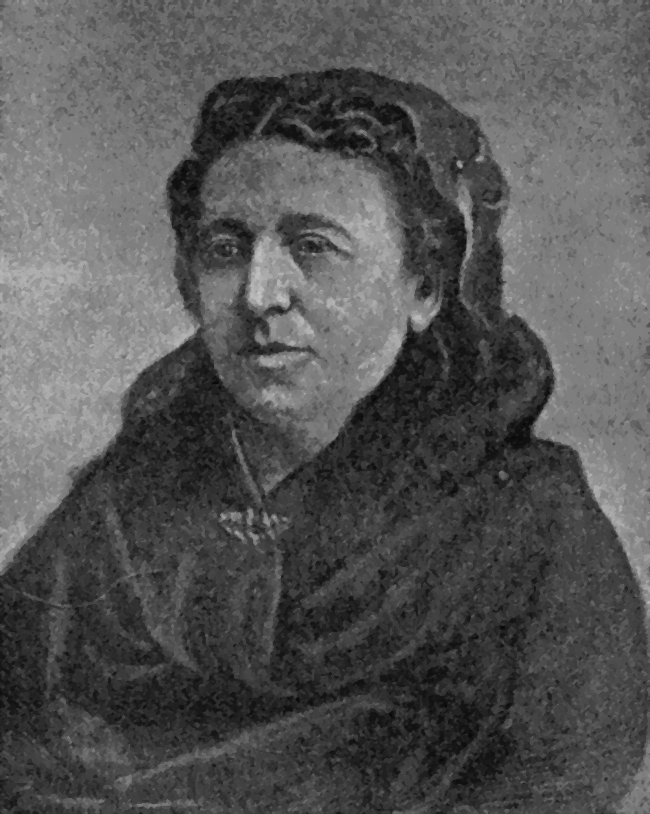
Justine Bonaparte, née Rufflin

On 22 March 1853, Pierre married Éléonore-Justine Ruflin, the daughter of a Paris plumber working as a doorman. Altogether, the couple had five children, but only two of them survived and reached adulthood:

- Prince Roland Napoleon Bonaparte (19 May 1858 - 14 April 1924). He entered the French Army, was excluded from it in 1886, and then devoted himself to geography and scientific explorations. He was the father of Marie Bonaparte, Princess George of Greece and Denmark.
- Princess Jeanne Bonaparte (25 September 1861 - 23 July 1910). She married Christian de Villeneuve-Esclapon (1852-1931).

== Death ==
Pierre Bonaparte died on 7 April 1881, at the age of 65, in obscurity at Versailles. He is interred in the Cimetière des Gonards in Versailles, France. His widow, Princess Éléonore-Justine Bonaparte, nicknamed "Nina", outlived him by 24 years, raising their granddaughter, Princess Marie. In 1905, when she died, she was buried alongside him in the Cimetière des Gonards, Versailles.
