= Attigny =

Attigny is the name of two communes in France:

- Attigny, Ardennes, in the Ardennes département
- Attigny, Vosges, in the Vosges département
