= Ninette (opera) =

Opéra comique by Charles Lecocq

Albert-Alexandre Piccaluga and Germaine Gallois as Cyrano and Ninon, 1896

Ninette is an opéra comique in three acts, with music by Charles Lecocq and words by Charles Clairville Jr, Eugène Hubert, G. Lebeaut and Ch. de Trogoff. It was first performed at the Théâtre des Bouffes-Parisiens, Paris, on 28 February 1896.

The opera depicts the complicated but ultimately successful course of true love between two French couples in the reign of Louis XIII (reigned 1610–1643). The two leading characters, Cyrano de Bergerac and Ninon de Lenclos, are loosely based on historical figures. This fictionalisation of Cyrano preceded, and is quite different from, Edmond Rostand's well-known version, which was written the following year.

== Background and performance history ==
In the 1870s Lecocq had supplanted Jacques Offenbach as Paris's favourite composer of comic operas, and had continued to enjoy frequent successes into the 1880s. After Le coeur et la main in 1882, success proved elusive. None of his nine subsequent operas had rivalled the popularity of his earlier works. Ninette was the most successful of the pieces he wrote in the 1890s, running for 107 performances, but it did not achieve a run comparable with his operas of the 1870s.

In his new opera Lecocq avoided his frequent theme of confused and farcical wedding nights and turned to a more romantic story, set in 17th-century Paris, and featuring dramatised versions of two historical characters, Cyrano de Bergerac and Ninon de Lenclos, the "Ninette"of the title. The opera was staged before Edmond Rostand's play about Cyrano, which was written the following year. The Cyrano presented by Lecocq's librettists differs considerably from Rostand's version, being a dashing, confident and good-looking hero.

== Original cast ==
Piccaluga, Gallois and Tauffenberger, 1896

- Cyrano de Bergerac – Albert-Alexandre Piccaluga
- Le Chevalier de Rouffignac – Fernand Tauffenberger
- Mélicerte – Théophile Barral
- Montfleury – M. Bartet
- Gontran de Chavennes – M. Duncan
- De Linière – M. Belval
- Un Exempt (officer of the watch) – M. Schey
- Ninon de Lenclos – Germaine Gallois
- Diane de Gassion – Alice Bonheur
- Marinette – Mlle Dziri

== Synopsis ==
Act I: Place Royale
The setting is Paris in 1640. Cyrano de Bergerac, the famous poet and duellist, loves and is loved by Ninon de l'Enclos (Ninette), a famous Parisian beauty. The two have exchanged letters, each containing vows of eternal fidelity, and they have agreed that if either breaks their pact he or she must return the promissory note to the other.

At the Place Royale, the fashionable Paris square, Cyrano gets into a quarrel with a young provincial gentleman, Gontran de Chavennes, who has just arrived in Paris for the first time. Gontran has made the acquaintance of Diane de Gassion, daughter of the eminent marshal. The young couple have fallen in love with each other, and have arranged to meet in Paris, at the Place Royale. Diane having been entrusted by her father to the care of a fussy old guardian, Mélicerte, Gontran has come to make a formal request for her hand, but unluckily he asks Cyrano to show him his way, and the latter, taking offence at an innocently meant remark, starts a sword fight, and Gontran is wounded.

The watchman appears and Cyrano starts a hasty escape. As he does so he sees his beloved Ninette coming to the aid of the wounded Gontran, whom she takes to her house. Diane arrives at the same time. Both she and Cyrano misread the situation and imagine that there is some romantic attraction between Ninon and Gaston. Diane and Cyrano are so furious with jealousy that they impulsively agree to marry each other. He wants to marry her immediately, but Diane makes it a condition that they wait thirty days, during which he must not fight anybody.

Mélicerte appears on the scene and Cyrano asks him for the hand of his ward. At this point the authorities catch up with the duellists, and Cyrano is sent to fight in the army and Gontran is taken to the Bastille.

Act II: Ninon's house
By her influence in high quarters Ninon is able to secure Gontran's release. She has taken a distinct fancy to him, and Cyrano is half forgotten. In Gontran's honour she gives a brilliant fête. Cyrano, in accordance with their pact, comes to return Ninon's billet doux, and she is ready to surrender his in exchange, but at this critical moment they both realise that they have never ceased to love each other. Gontran's affection for Diane has not cooled in the least, and despite her jealousy she remains in love with him.

Act III: Picpus, near Paris

The duel at Picpus

The thirty days have almost elapsed and Cyrano has duly restrained himself from duelling, in accordance with his undertaking. By the terms of their agreement, he and Diane must now marry each other. Neither now wishes to go ahead, but both feel that honour requires it.

Ninon takes matters in hand. She conceals Cyrano so that he may overhear a tender meeting between Diane and Gontran which she has arranged at her house. Once Cyrano realises, to his relief, that Diane still remains in love with Gontran, he takes the obvious step to free her from engagement to him: he fights a duel. He crosses swords with his drunken friend Rouffignac, who has chosen this convenient moment to pick a fight. By duelling, Cyrano breaches the conditions of his engagement, and the two couples are free to marry their true loves.

== Numbers ==
=== Act I ===
- Chœur – Bourgeois, soldats, seigneurs (Middle classes, soldiers, lords)
- Couplets – Ah! la bonne plaisanterie (Ah, the good joke – Diane)
- Chœur – Place, place, place (Make way!)
- Couplets – Vous m'aimez tous (You all love me – Ninon)
- Duo – Cela me plait – (I live it – Ninon, Cyrano)
- Madrigal – Jaloux de vous (Jealous of you – Ninon, Cyrano)
- Couplets J'ai pris, avec ma malle (I took, with my luggage – Gontran)
- Scène du duel – Au nom du Roi (In the King's name – L'exempt, Cyrano, Rouffignac, Chœur)
- Quatuor – Allons, tenez-vous en repos (Come on, rest – Diane, Ninon, Gontran, Cyrano)
- Finale – Soldats valeureux (Valiant soldiers)
  - Chanson Militaire – La guerre et l'amour (War and love – Cyrano)

=== Act II ===
- Entr'acte–pavane
- Air – Mouzon est une ville forte (Mouzon is a strong city – Rouffignac)
- Couplets – C'est de doux mots (It's sweet talk – Gontran)
- Duetto – Tant de charmes (So many charms – Diane, Ninon)
- Duo – C'est qu'elle est charmante (She is so charming – Ninon, Cyrano)
- Quintette – Trahison (Treachery – Ninon, Gontran, Mélicerte, Cyrano)
- Finale – Pour écouter les vers (To listen to the verses)
  - Idylle – Avez-vous vu par les prés (Have you seen, through the meadows – Ninon)
  - Chanson du pont – Un beau mousquetaire – (A handsome musketeer – Ninon)

=== Act III ===
- Entr'acte
- Terzetto – Trente jours sont passés (Thirty days have passed – Diane, Mélicerte, Cyrano)
- Couplets – De votre serin, ô Sylvie (Your legs, O Sylive – Mélicerte)
- Romance – C'est Ninette (It is Ninette – Cyrano)
- Chœur – Sens tarder davantage (Delay more)
- Scène – Deux fiancés (Two finacés – Ninon)
- Duettino – Ah! que s'aimer (Ah, what love – Diane, Gontran)
- Couplets – Allez, monsieur (Come on, Monsieur – Ninon)
- Terzetto – Ah! Ninette (Ninon, Diane, Gontran)
- Couplet-Finale – Tout ce que je souhaite (All I want – Ninon, Chorus)

== Critical reception ==
The Paris correspondent of The Era described Ninette as "a pretty, singularly innocent comic opera with tuneful, elegant music", and observed that it seemed possibly a little out of place at the Bouffes-Parisiens, and would have been well suited to the Opéra-Comique. The same critic commented that the plot was not novel but had been ingeniously arranged, and the music, though slightly old-fashioned in style, was "charmingly melodious and elegant", lacking only "a stronger dash of originality and drollery". The Monthly Musical Record felt that the new work "hardly suggests the once-delightful composer of the Cent Vierges, the Fille de Mme. Angot and Giroflé-Girofla".

== References and sources ==
Sources

- Stoullig, Edmond (1897). Les annales du théâtre et de la musique, 1896 (in French). Paris: G. Charpentier. OCLC 762314202.
