= Cimetière des Gonards =

Cemetery in Versailles, France

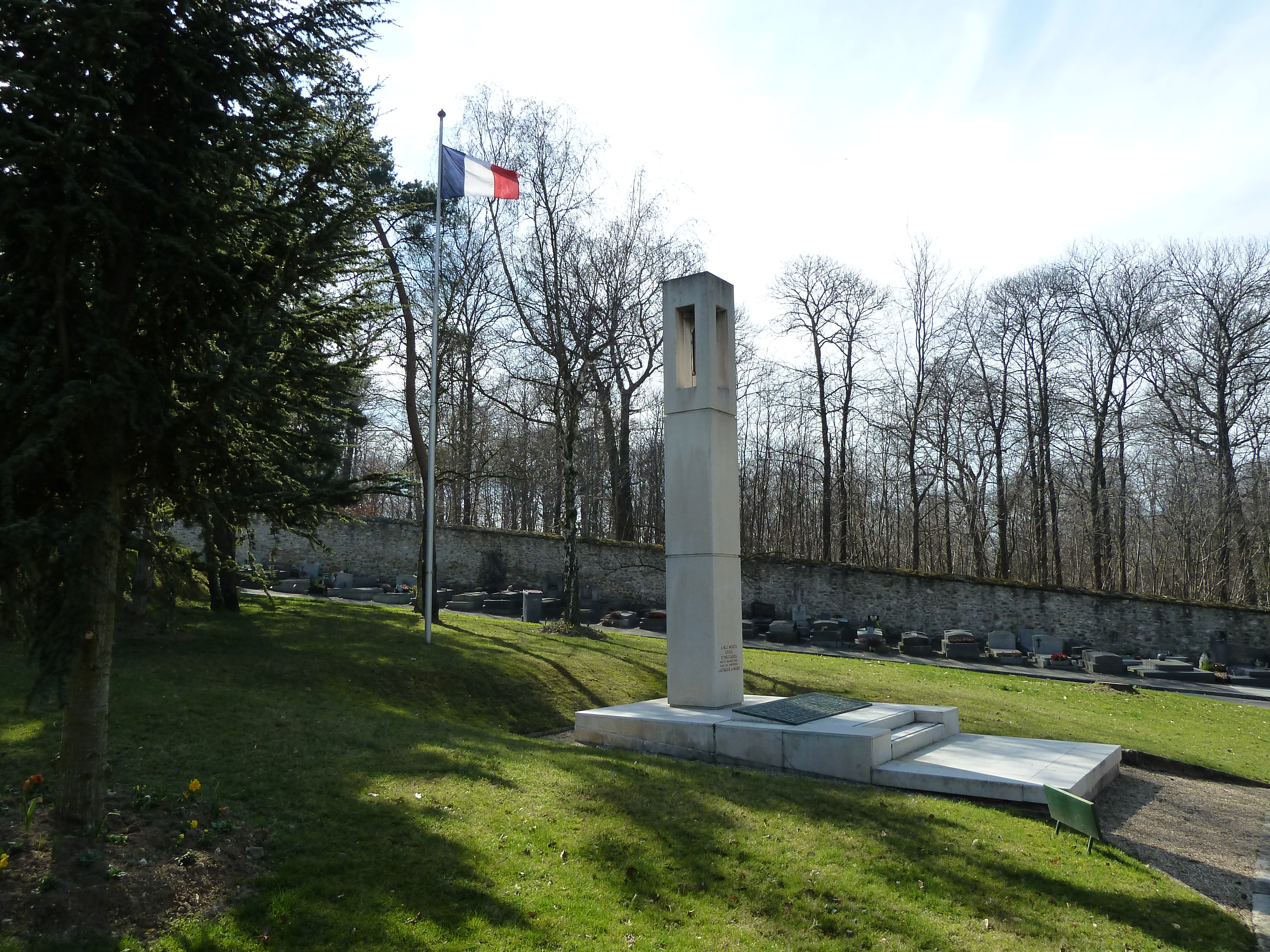
- Interactive map of Cimetière des Gonards

Details
- Established: 1879
- Location: Versailles
- Country: France
- Coordinates: 48°47′29″N 2°8′17″E
- Type: garden cemetery
- Size: 13 hectares (32 acres)
- No. of graves: 12,000
- Website: Official website
- Find a Grave: Cimetière des Gonards

The Cimetière des Gonards (French pronunciation: [simtjɛʁ de ɡɔnaʁ]) is the largest cemetery in Versailles on the outskirts of Paris. It began operations in 1879. The cemetery covers an area of 13 hectares (32 acres) and contains more than 12,000 graves.

== Description ==
This is a rurally landscaped cemetery, the upper part of which is laid out with walks and planted with trees. The Devos-Logie and Mirand-Devos Chapels were designed by the architect Hector Guimard in 1894.

There is a section for military graves, including 534 German military graves from the two World Wars, marked by a monument and stelae of pink granite, and a war graves section containing the graves of 181 British Commonwealth service personnel of both World Wars. In the highest part is a monument to those French service personnel who are buried in the graveyards of North Africa.

The cemetery also contains a Jewish area (sections "L sud" and "L ouest"), and many English and American Protestant burials.

The notorious executed murderers Henri Désiré Landru and Eugène Weidmann are buried here, in unmarked graves.

== Notable burials ==
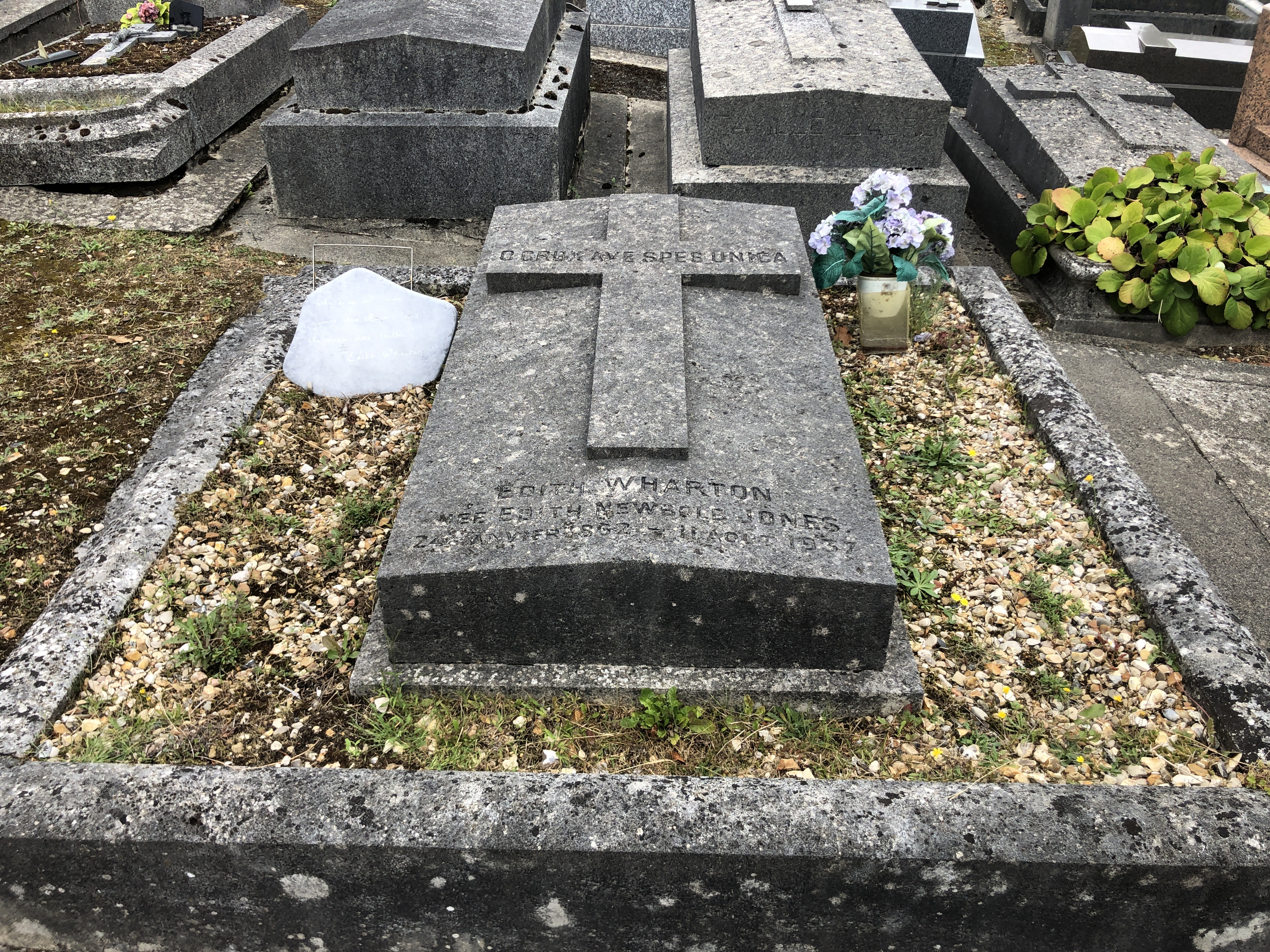
Grave of Edith Wharton.

- Marc Allégret (1900–1973), film director
- Abolhassan Banisadr (1933–2021), first president of the Islamic Republic of Iran
- Louis Bernard (1864–1955), general
- Louis Blériot (1872–1936), pioneer aviator
- Princess Éléonore-Justine Bonaparte (1832–1905)
- Princess Marie-Félix Bonaparte (1859–1882)
- Prince Pierre Napoleon Bonaparte, (1815–1881)
- Prince Roland Bonaparte (1858–1924)
- Louise Bryant (1885–1936), American journalist and author
- Louis Cartier (1875–1942), jeweller, watchmaker
- Louis-François Cartier (1819–1904), jeweller
- Hélène Dieudonné (1884–1980), actress
- Gabriel Monod (1844–1912), historian
- Robert de Montesquiou (1855–1921), poet, and Gabriel Yturri (1860–1905), his secretary and lover
- Armand Renaud (1836–1895), poet
- Georges Saillard (1877–1967), actor
- Edith Wharton (1862–1937), American writer
- Émile Benveniste (1902–1976), linguist and semiotician

== Gallery ==
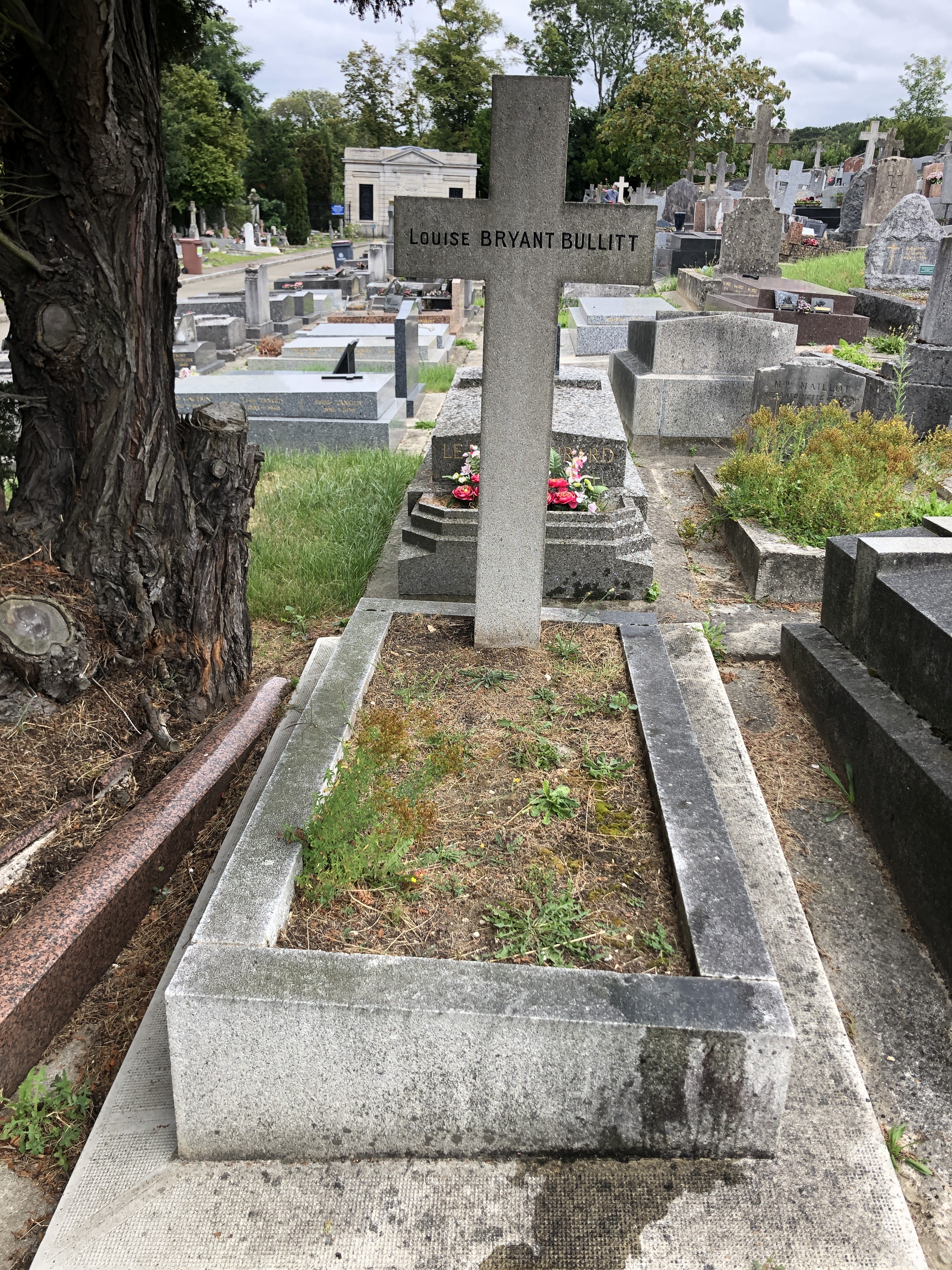
Grave of Louise Bryant

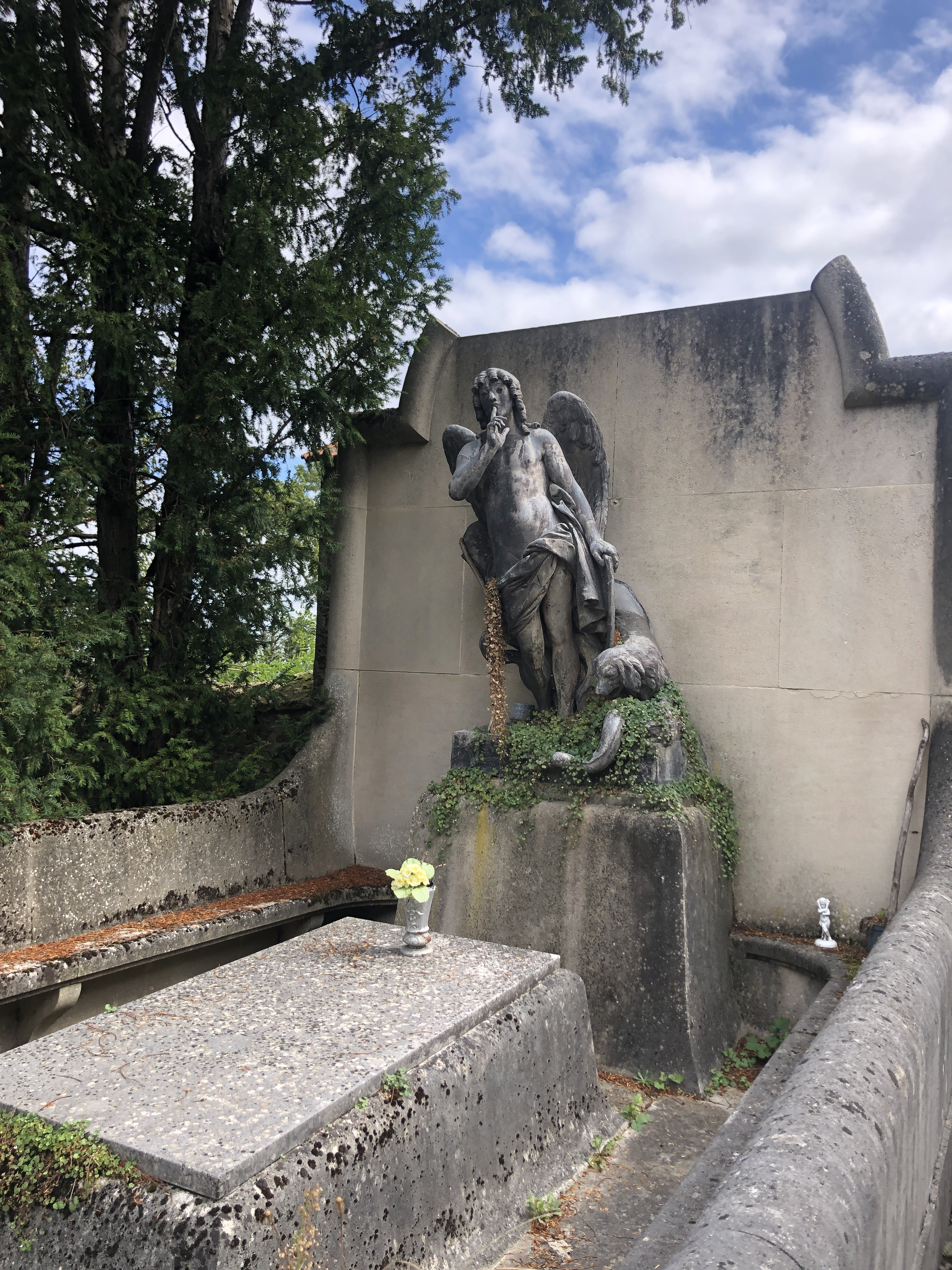
Grave of poet Robert de Montesquiou

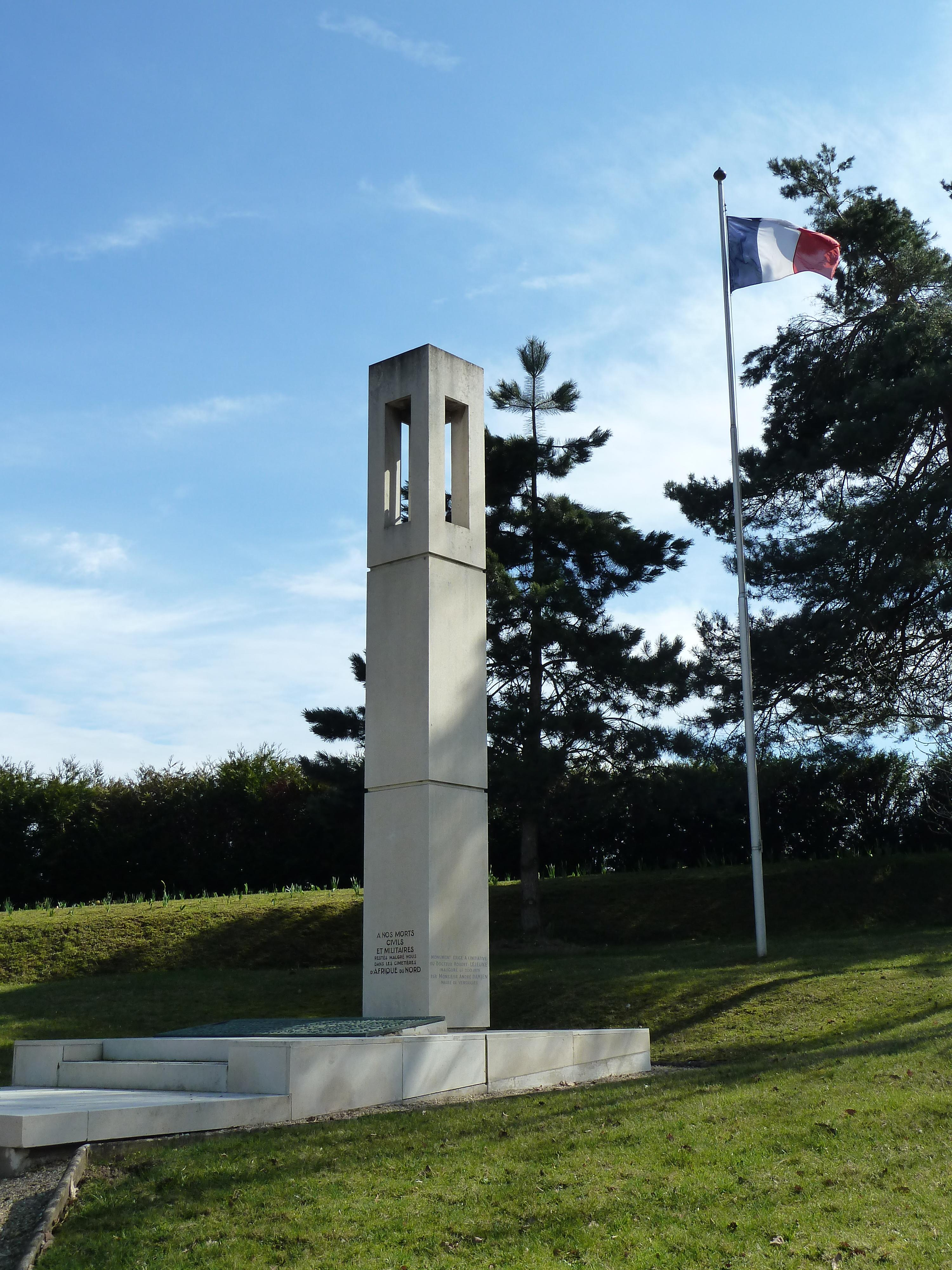
Monument to the French of North Africa

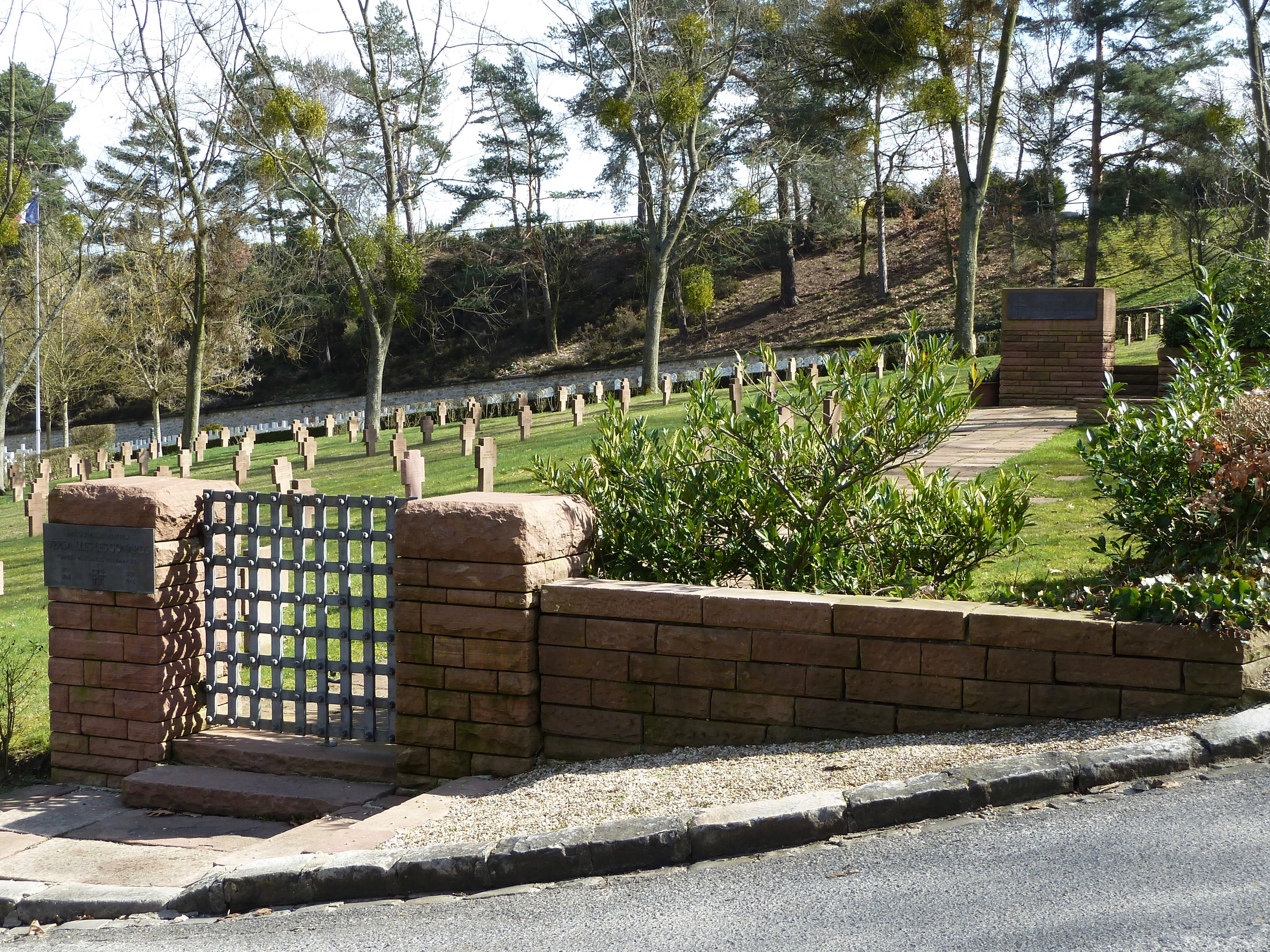
German military graves

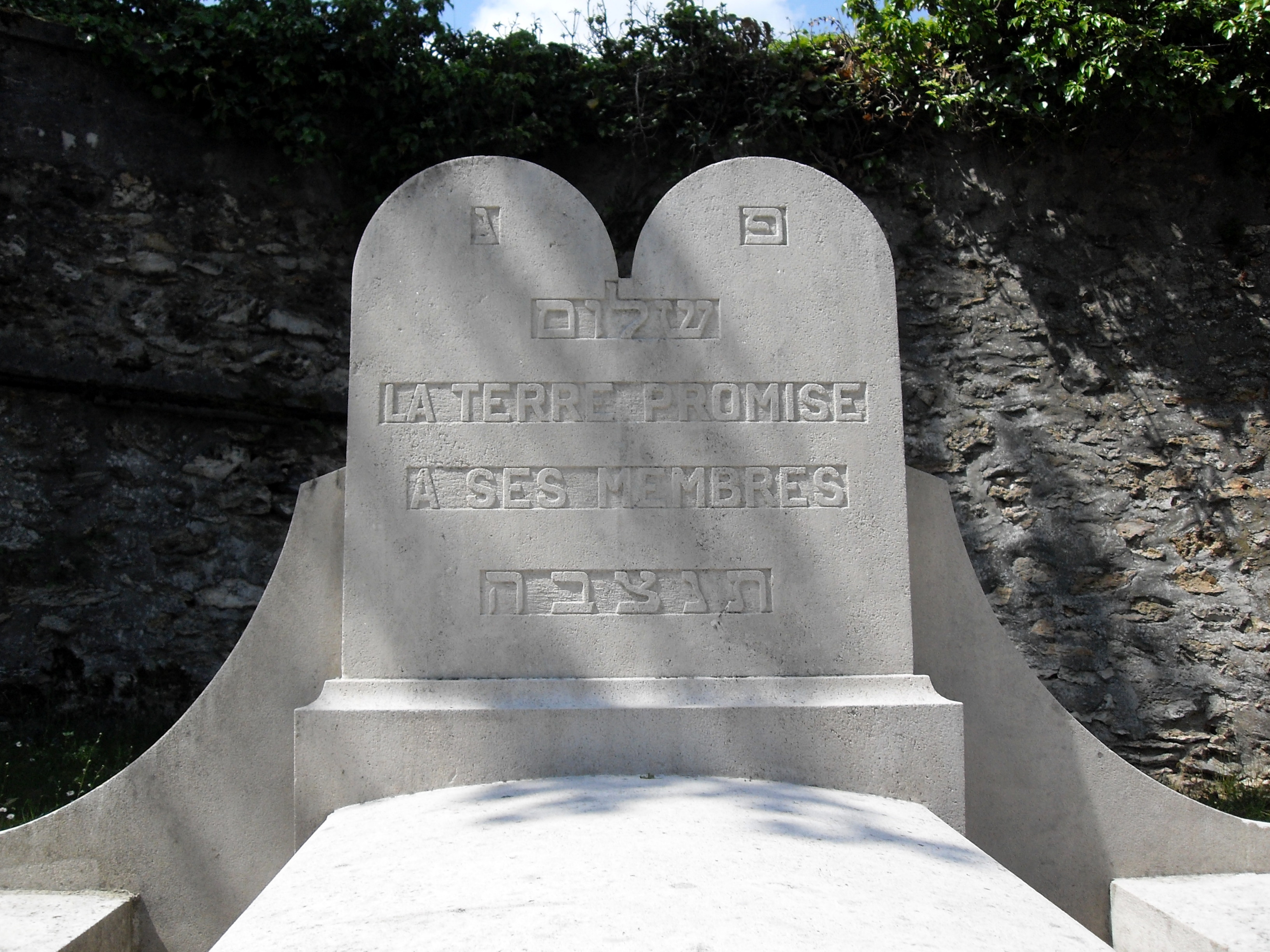
Jewish gravestone
