= Ninon de l'Enclos =

French author and courtesan (1620–1705)

Ninon de L'Enclos
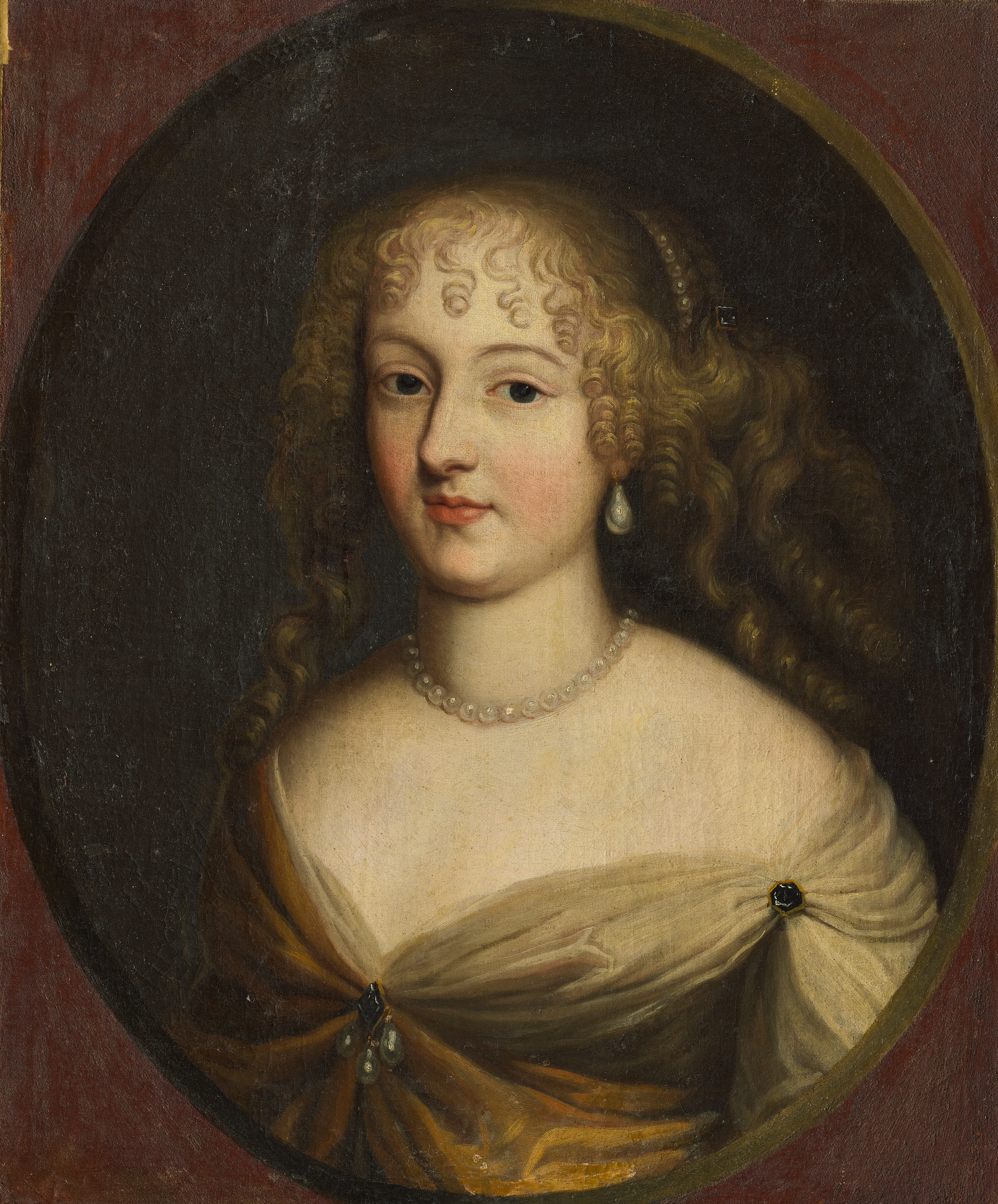
- Ninon de L'Enclos, by unknown artist.
- Born: 10 November 1620; Paris, France
- Died: 17 October 1705 (aged 84); Paris, France

Anne "Ninon" de l'Enclos, also spelled Ninon de Lenclos and Ninon de Lanclos (10 November 1620 – 17 October 1705), was a French writer, courtesan and patron of the arts.

== Early life ==
Born Anne de l'Enclos in Paris on 10 November 1620, she was nicknamed "Ninon" at an early age by her father, Henri de l'Enclos, a lutenist and published composer, who taught her to sing and play the lute. In 1632, he was exiled from France after a duel. When Ninon's mother, Marie Barbe de la Marche, died ten years later, the unmarried Ninon entered a convent, only to leave the next year. For the remainder of her life she was determined to remain unmarried and independent.

== Life as a courtesan and author ==
Returning to Paris, she became a popular figure in the salons, and her own drawing room became a centre for the discussion and consumption of the literary arts. In her early thirties she was responsible for encouraging the young Molière, and when she died she left money for the son of her notary, a nine-year-old named François-Marie Arouet, later to become known as Voltaire, so he could buy books.

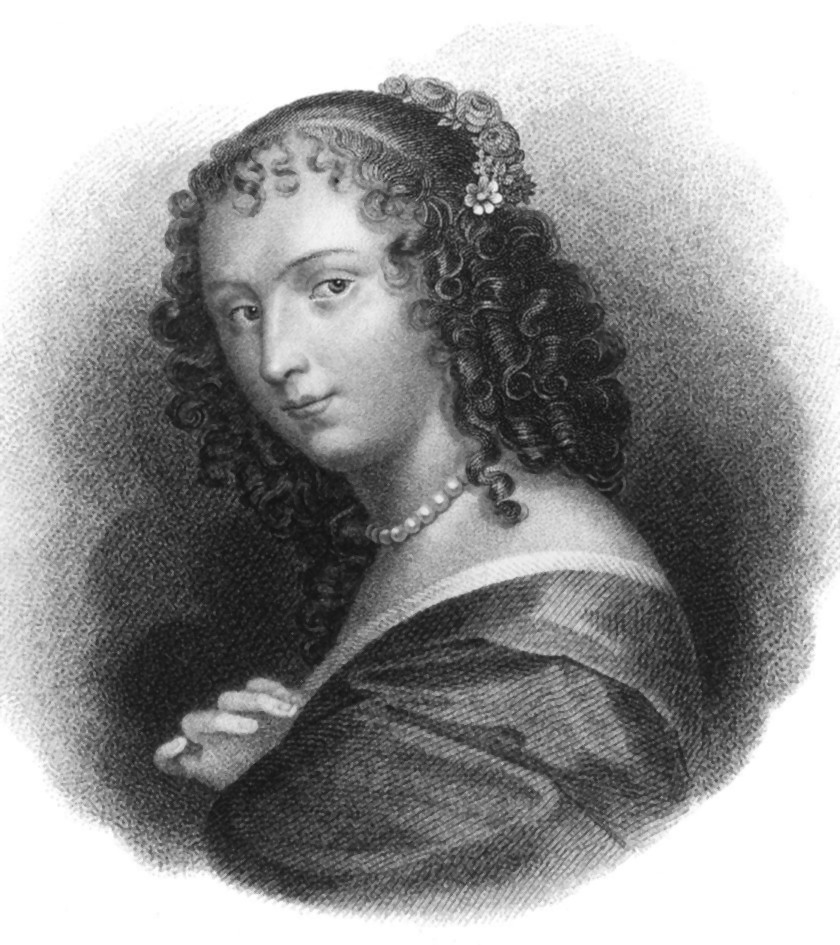
Etching by Antoine-Jean-Baptiste Coupé, 19th century

It was during this period that her life as a courtesan began. Ninon took a succession of notable and wealthy lovers, including the king's cousin Louis, Grand Condé and Gaston de Coligny. These men did not support her, however; she prided herself on her independent income. Saint-Simon wrote: "Ninon always had crowds of adorers but never more than one lover at a time, and when she tired of the present occupier, she said so frankly and took another. Yet such was the authority of this wanton, that no man dared fall out with his successful rival; he was only too happy to be allowed to visit as a familiar friend." In 1652, Ninon took up with Louis de Mornay, the marquis de Villarceaux, by whom she had a son, also named Louis. She lived with the marquis until 1655, when she returned to Paris. When she would not return to him, the marquis fell into a fever; to console him, Ninon cut her hair and sent the shorn locks to him, starting a vogue for bobbed hair à la Ninon.

This life (less acceptable in her time than it would become in later years) and her opinions on organised religion caused her some trouble, and she was imprisoned in the Madelonnettes Convent in 1656 at the behest of Anne of Austria, Queen of France and regent for her son Louis XIV. Not long after, however, she was visited by Christina, former queen of Sweden. Impressed, Christina wrote to Cardinal Mazarin on Ninon's behalf and arranged for her release.

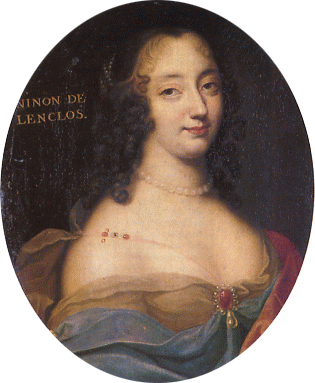
Ninon de Lenclos by Louis Ferdinand Elle the Elder

In response, as an author she defended the possibility of living a good life in the absence of religion, notably in 1659's La coquette vengée (The Flirt Avenged). She was also noted for her wit; among her numerous sayings and quips are "Much more genius is needed to make love than to command armies" and "We should take care to lay in a stock of provisions, but not of pleasures: these should be gathered day by day." An "admirable sketch" of Ninon, under the name of Damo, occurs in Mlle. de Scudéry's novel Clélie (1654–1661).

Starting in the late 1660s she retired from her courtesan lifestyle and concentrated more on her literary friends – from 1667, she hosted her gatherings at l'hôtel Sagonne, which was considered "the" location of the salon of Ninon de l'Enclos despite other locales in the past. During this time she was a friend of Jean Racine, the great French playwright. Later she would become a close friend with the devout Françoise d'Aubigné, better known as Madame de Maintenon, the lady-in-waiting who would later become the second wife of Louis XIV. Saint-Simon wrote that "The lady did not like her to be mentioned in her presence, but dared not disown her, and wrote cordial letters to her from time to time, to the day of her death". Ninon eventually died at the age of 84, as a very wealthy woman. To the end, she "was convinced that she had no soul, and never abandoned that conviction, not even in advanced old age, not even at the hour of her death."

== Legacy ==
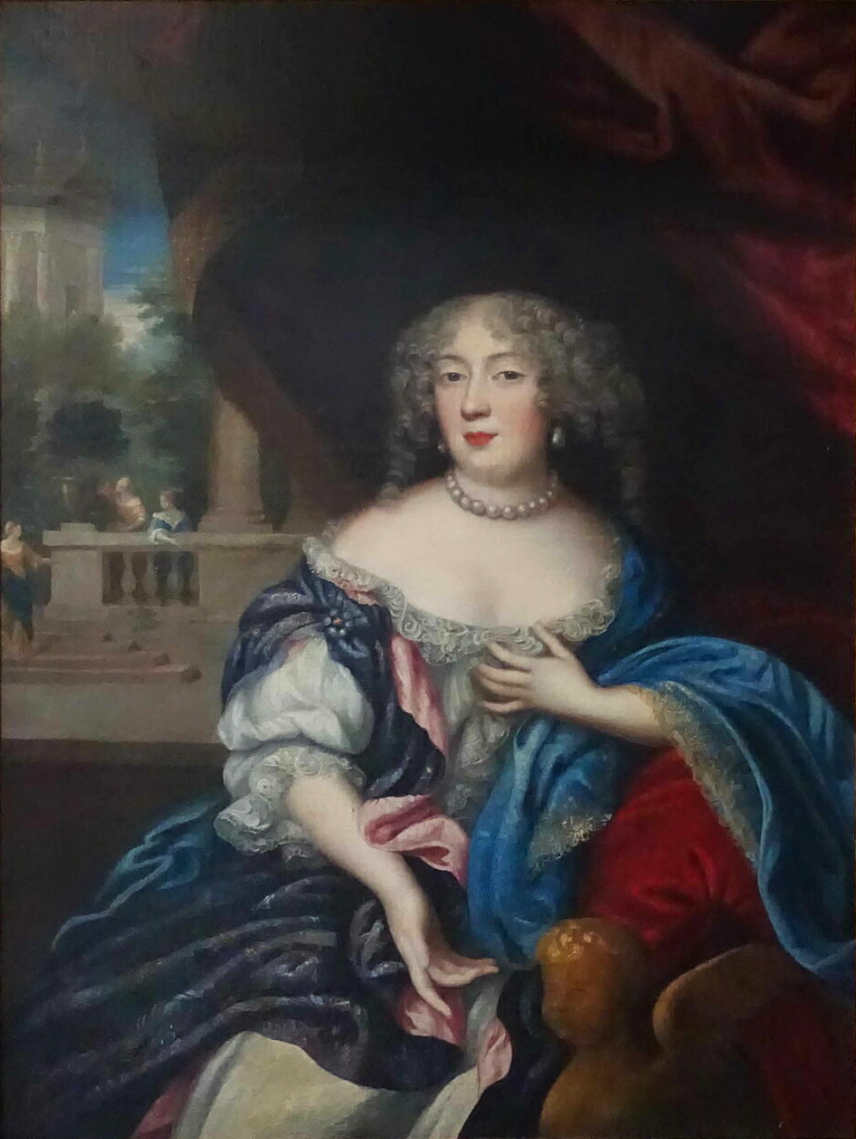
Ninon de l'Enclos by Pierre Mignard

Immanuel Kant, in his Observations on the Feeling of the Beautiful and Sublime, uses Lenclos's life to emphasize how the most bitter reproach for an eighteenth-century woman was to be called unchaste: "The maiden Ninon Lenclos made not the least claims to the honor of chastity, and nevertheless she would have been implacably offended if one of her lovers had gone so far in his judgment." Kant underscored the sexist moral double-standard during Lenclos' life and during Kant's life time.

Ninon de l'Enclos is a relatively obscure figure in the English-speaking world, but is much better known in France, where her name is synonymous with wit and beauty. Saint-Simon noted "Ninon made friends among the great in every walk of life, had wit and intelligence enough to keep them, and, what is more, to keep them friendly with one another."

Edgar Allan Poe mentioned her in his short story "The Spectacles", as did Rudyard Kipling in "Venus Annodomini". Anais Nin mentions her alongside Madame Bovary in the novel, A Spy in the House of Love. Edwin Arlington Robinson used Ninon as a symbol of aging beauty in his poem "Veteran Sirens". Dorothy Parker wrote the poem "Ninon de l'Enclos on Her Last Birthday" and also referred to Ninon in another of her poems, "Words of Comfort to Be Scratched on a Mirror". L'Enclos is the eponymous heroine of Charles Lecocq's 1896 opéra comique Ninette.
