= Jeanne Bonaparte =

- Marquise de Villeneuve-Escaplon
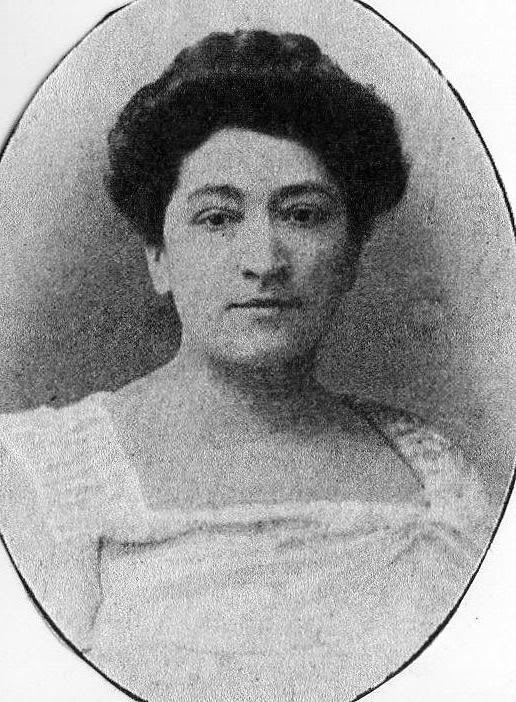
- Born: 15 September 1861; Orval Abbey, Belgium
- Died: 25 July 1910 (aged 48); Paris, France
- Spouse: Christian de Villeneuve-Esclapon (m. 1882)
- Issue: Jules Pierre Napoléon de Villeneuve-Esclapon; Henriette Marie Jeanne de Villeneuve-Esclapon; Romée Napoléon de Villeneuve-Esclapon; Lucien Louis Napoléon de Villeneuve-Esclapon; Marie Roselyne de Villeneuve-Esclapon; Rolande Anne Mathilde de Villeneuve-Esclapon
- House: Bonaparte
- Father: Pierre Napoleon Bonaparte
- Mother: Éléonore-Justine Ruflin

Jeanne Bonaparte (15 September 1861 – 25 July 1910) was a great-niece of Napoleon I of France, and the only daughter of Pierre Napoleon Bonaparte by his wife Éléonore-Justine Ruflin. She was well known in French society as an artist and sculptor, and was married to Christian de Villeneuve-Esclapon.

== Biography ==
=== Early life ===
Jeanne was born on 15 September 1861 in Orval Abbey, Belgium. She was one of five children born to her parents, but only one of two who survived to adulthood. Her brother being Roland Bonaparte. She was born during the reign of Napoleon III of France, but her family was never well received at the French imperial court as her grandfather Lucien Bonaparte displeased his brother Napoleon I with his choice of wife and was consequently disinherited. Her own father too being disinherited over his own choice of wife. Among French society, she was known for her paintings and sculptures.

After the fall of the Second French Empire in 1870, Jeanne, like all other Bonapartes, were sent into exile. She and her family moved to Brussels and then to London, where her father died shortly after.

As children, Jeanne and Roland received a first-class education. While they were in London, a former French officer whose father had served under Napoleon I took pity on the family and made arrangements for Roland to return to France and attend a military school. He also helped Jeanne by sending her to an art school in Paris. Jeanne took courses in painting and engraving. In the art school where she studied, she befriended the prosperous Monegasque heiress, Marie-Félix Blanc. Jeanne would later introduce Roland to Marie, who later marry. This greatly benefited the family's financial situation as Marie and her brother each gave Jeanne a million francs, after which she received many proposals, but her family encouraged her to marry for love.

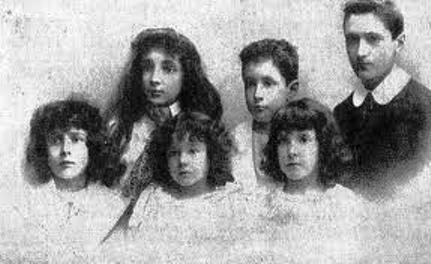
Children of Jeanne Bonaparte and Christian de Villeneuve

=== Marriage ===
She married Christian de Villeneuve-Escacalpon, the deputy of Corsica on 21 March 1882.

One observer commented at their wedding:

"Jeanne Bonaparte advanced up the nave leaning on the arm of her brother... She has little of her mother's striking beauty, although she resembles her a good deal, but she is tall, distinguished looking, and has a wealth of raven tresses..."

Jeanne and Christian had six children:

- Jules Pierre Napoléon de Villeneuve-Esclapon (1886–1957). He married Cécile Ernestine Marie de Courtois (1896–1981).
- Henriette Marie Jeanne de Villeneuve-Esclapon (1887–1942). She married Lucien Leret d'Aubigny (1876–1945).
- Romée Napoléon de Villeneuve-Esclapon (1889–1944).
- Lucien Louis Napoléon de Villeneuve-Esclapon (1890–1939). He married Iskouhi-Gladys Matossian (1894–1951).
- Marie Roselyne de Villeneuve-Esclapon (1893–1973). She married Bruno de Maigret (1888–1966).
- Rolande Anne Mathilde de Villeneuve-Esclapon (1896–1972). She married Antoine de Lyée de Belleau (1898–1978).

=== Later life ===
Jeanne had a Paris salon that was frequented by illustrious writers and painters, as well as the cream of American society. Her husband was, apart from politics, mostly interested in occultism. George Greville Moore, an English officer, was a contemporary of Jeanne's. He wrote that she:

"Used to make a great display of toilette at certain balls. She was remarkable for her beauty, which was more of the Oriental style; she was very dark and had a sallow complexion, but beautiful black eyes and long eyelashes. I remember one evening every one crowding around the staircase to see her arrive at a ball. On that occasion she wore a white dress trimmed with water-lilies, with a tremendously long train, and no jewelry whatsoever. She rarely, if ever, danced; her long train scarcely allowed it."

On 21 November 1907, Jeanne served as a witness for the marriage of her niece Princess Marie Bonaparte to Prince George of Greece and Denmark.

Jeanne died on 25 July 1910 in Paris, at the age of 48, predeceasing her husband by three years.

== Ancestry ==
Ancestors of Jeanne Bonaparte

16. Giuseppe Maria Buonaparte
8. Carlo Maria Buonaparte
17. Maria Saveria Paravisini
4. Lucien Bonaparte
18. Giovanni Geronimo Ramolino
9. Maria Letizia Ramolino
19. Angela Maria Pietrasanta
2. Pierre Napoleon Bonaparte
20. Nicolas Jacob de Bleschamp
10. Charles Jacob de Bleschamp
21. Marguerite de Horgnes
5. Alexandrine de Bleschamp
22. Jean Charles Bouvet
11. Philiberte Bouvet
23. Marie Gasparde Grimod de Verneuil
1. Jeanne Bonaparte
24. Louis Ruflin
12. Louis Jacques Ruflin
25. Marie Chervy
6. Julien Louis Ruflin
26. Julien Colinet
13. Madeleine Anne Julienne Colinet
27. Marie Anne Pecquenard
3. Justine Éléonore Ruflin
28. Charles Lucard
14. Pierre Joseph Lucard
29. Catherine Pêcheur
7. Marguerite Justine Lucard
30. Joseph Henry
15. Élisabeth Henry
31. Antoinette Begrand
