= Eugène Hubert =

French journalist and playwright (1846–1904)

Eugène Hubert (Sury-en-Vaux, 1846–1904) was a 19th-century French journalist and playwright.

Graduated in law, he became a banker and later decided to devote himself to journalism and literature. His plays were presented at Théâtre du Château-d'Eau and Théâtre des Bouffes-Parisiens.

== Works ==
- 1872: Les Actrices de Paris, quatrains, with Christian de Trogoff
- 1876: Revendication, three-act drama, with de Trogoff
- 1878: Populus, drama in 5 acts and 8 tableaux, including a prologue, with Ulric de Fonvielle and Christian de Trogoff
- 1879: Le loup de Kevergan, drama in five acts and tableaux, with Émile Rochard
- 1879: Péchés de jeunesse, poems
- 1898: Ninette, three-act opéra comique, with Charles Clairville and de Trogoff
