= January 1871 Paris uprising =

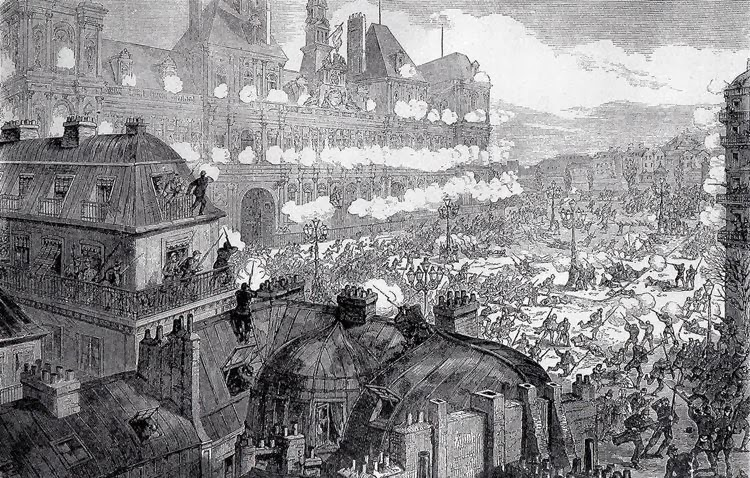
Engraving of the January attack

On January 22, 1871, a contingent of France's National Guard marched on Paris's City Hall (Hôtel de Ville). The group opposed the armistice that was being drafted, believing that the French government had sabotaged their military. Demonstrators released Gustave Flourens and marched on the City Hall, including 150 guardsmen. But unlike the larger City Hall uprising three months earlier, Breton Mobile Guards defended the building. Five died, and 18 were wounded. Though the event had been smaller than the October uprising, the January insurrection irreconcilably split Paris's factions and presaged the coming civil war.

Revolutionaries involved in the uprising included Louise Michel, Sophie Poirier, and Andre Leo. At the demonstration, Michel dressed as a National Guard with a rifle and rallied for a Commune, a revolutionary government.

== Bibliography ==
- Gluckstein, Donny (2006). The Paris Commune: A Revolutionary Democracy. Bookmarks. ISBN 978-1-905192-14-4.
