= Félix Duquesnel =

French writer (1832–1915)

- Born: Félix Henri Duquesnel; 2 July 1832; Paris, France
- Died: 28 April 1915 (aged 82); Paris, France
- Occupations: Journalist; Playwright; Novelist

Félix Henri Duquesnel (2 July 1832 – 28 April 1915) was a French journalist, playwright and novelist.

== Biography ==
He studied at the College Rollin, then at the Faculty of Law and was admitted to the bar which he quickly left to turn to journalism.

A journalist at L'Illustration, Je sais tout or Le Gaulois among other newspapers, Duquesne was theatre manager of the Théâtre de l'Odéon from 1866, of the Théâtre du Châtelet (with Émile Rochard) (1880-1882), then of the Théâtre de la Porte Saint-Martin from 1884 to 1893. His plays were presented on the most significant Parisian stages of his time, including the Théâtre Sarah Bernhardt, the Théâtre du Vaudeville, and the Théâtre des Capucines.

He left an important correspondence with numerous personalities of the nineteenth century such as Émile Augier, Gustave Flaubert, Sainte-Beuve, Jules Sandeau, Adolphe d'Ennery, Xavier de Montépin, Jules Verne, Alexandre Dumas, George Sand.

== Works ==
=== Theatre ===
- 1903: La Peur, one-act comedy
- 1906: La maîtresse de piano, play in five acts and 6 tableaux preceded by a prologue, with André Barde
- 1907: Patachon, four-act comedy, with Maurice Hennequin
- 1907: Le Cavalier Pioche, one-act play
- 1909: La saison russe à Paris
- 1911: Sa Fille, four-act comedy, with Barde

=== Novels ===
- 1895: Le Roman d'une fleuriste, Ollendorff
- 1904: Contes des dix mille et deux nuits, Flammarion
- 1905: Le mystère de Gaude, Calmann-Lévy
- 1909: Monsieur Roussignac, policier, Juven
- 1910: A la flamme de Paris, Fasquelle
- 1913: La bande des habits noirs, Fasquelle

=== Other ===
- L'alphabet rationnel, étude sur l'alphabétisme et la graphie de la langue française, Delagrave, 1897
- Souvenirs littéraires : George Sand, Alexandre Dumas, souvenirs intimes, Plon-Nourrit, posth., 1922

== Bibliography ==
- Volker Dehs, Les souvenirs de Félix Duquesnel, Bulletin de la Société Jules-Verne n° 132, (p. 27-31)
- Elsa de Lavergne, La naissance du roman policier français, 2009, (p. 320) ISBN 2812400285, ISBN 978-2812400285
