= Émile Rochard =

French playwright, novelist and poet

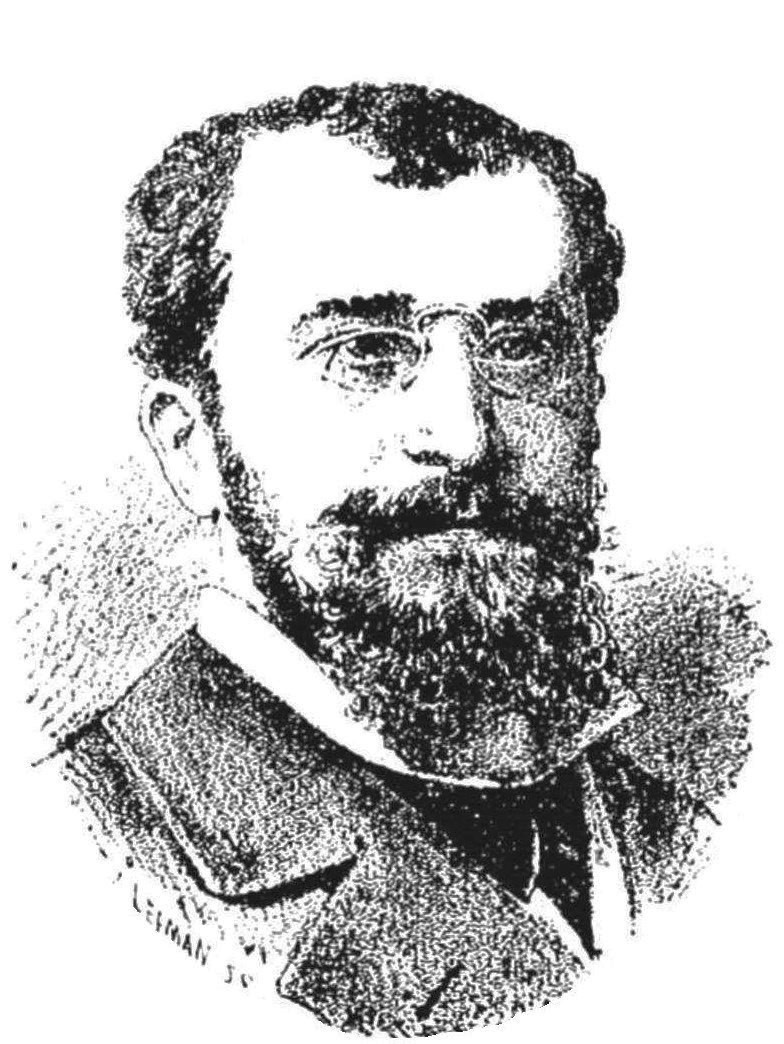

Émile Calixte Rochard (3 July 1851, Wissembourg – May 1918, Paris) was a 19th–20th-century French playwright, novelist and poet.

== Biography ==
He made his debut in literature in 1870 with a comedy, Un Amour de Diane de Poitiers and volunteered during the Franco-Prussian War of 1870.

A drama critic at Gil-Blas, codirector of Théâtre du Châtelet (1880–1883) with Félix Duquesnel, director of Théâtre de l'Ambigu-Comique (1884–1903) then of Théâtre de la Porte-Saint-Martin (1991–1903), his plays were presented on the most important Parisian stages of the 19th century.

Rochard was made a chevalier of the Légion d'honneur 9 July 1892.

== Works ==
- 1870: Un Amour de Diane de Poitiers, one-act comedy, in verse
- 1873: La Conscience, one-act episode, in verse
- 1874: Les Petits ours, futilités parisiennes, poetry
- 1875: La Botte secrète, one-act play, with Georges Guilhaud
- 1875: Plus de journaux, one-act comedy
- 1879: Le Loup de Kevergan, drama in five acts and tableaux, with Eugène Hubert and Christian de Trogoff
- 1903: Les Dernières cartouches, drama in 5 acts and 10 tableaux, with Mary
- 1903: Les deux Eves, novel, 2 vols., Flammarion ed.
- 1906: Roule-ta-bosse, drama in 5 acts, 6 tableaux, preceded by a prologue
- 1906: Sonnez, clairons ! roman contemporain (1865–1898), Flammarion ed.
- 1908: La Bête féroce, drama in 5 acts, 8 tableaux, with Mary
- 1908: La Beauté du diable, drama in 5 acts and 8 tableaux, including a prologue, with Mary
- 1909: Les Deux jeunesses, poems, Lemerre
- 1910: Le Péché de Marthe, drama in 2 parts, 5 acts and 7 tableaux, after the novel by Paul Bertnay
- 1911: L'Enfant des fortifs, play in 5 acts and 8 tableaux, with Mary
- 1911: Toute la femme en cent rondels : cœur, corps, atours, frivolités, poems
- 1912: L'Avocat des gueux, drama in 5 acts and 7 tableaux, derivec from the novel published in Petit Parisien, with Jules Mary
- 1913: Jésus selon les Évangiles, novel, Lemerre
- 1913: La Passion, drama in 5 acts and 8 tableaux derived from Jésus selon les Évangiles
- 1917: Le Berceau de Jésus, drama in 2 parts and 6 tableaux
- 1919: Jésus, (vie publique), drama in 5 acts and 10 tableaux
- 1919: La Résurrection, two-part drama

== Bibliography ==
- Études religieuses, historiques et littéraires, 1919, (p. 43)
- Henry Philips, Aude Pichon, Louis-Georges Tin, Le théâtre catholique en France au XXe siècle, 2007, (p. 292)
