= Attigny, Vosges =

Attigny
- Commune
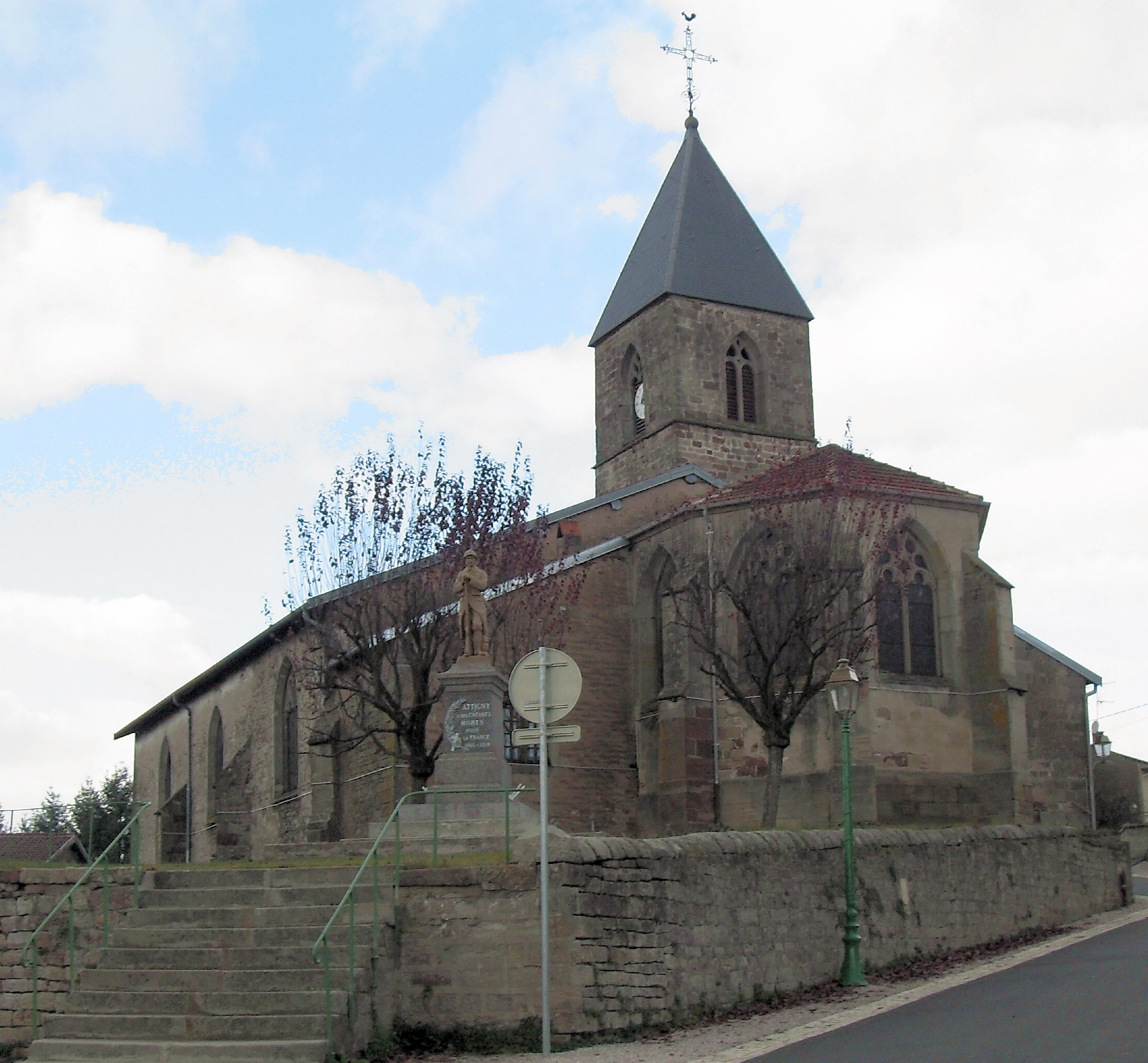
- The church in Attigny
- Location of Attigny
- Location within France Location within Grand Est
- Coordinates: 48°03′56″N 6°02′11″E
- Country: France
- Region: Grand Est
- Department: Vosges
- Arrondissement: Neufchâteau
- Canton: Darney
- Intercommunality: CC Vosges Côté Sud-Ouest

Government
  - Mayor (2020–2026): François Joly
- Area^{1}: 16.08 km^{2} (6.21 sq mi)
- Elevation: 285 m (935 ft)
- Highest elevation: 343 m (1,125 ft)
- Lowest elevation: 247 m (810 ft)
- Population (2023): 200
  - Density: 12/km^{2} (32/sq mi)
- Time zone: UTC+01:00 (CET)
  - Summer (DST): UTC+02:00 (CEST)
- INSEE/Postal code: 88016 /88260
- ^{1} French Land Register data, which excludes lakes, ponds, glaciers > 1 km^{2} (0.386 sq mi or 247 acres) and river estuaries.

Attigny (French pronunciation: [atiɲi]) is a commune in the Vosges department in Grand Est in northeastern France.

== Notable people ==
- Victor Noir, journalist

== See also ==
- Communes of the Vosges department
