= Château de Vaugrenier =

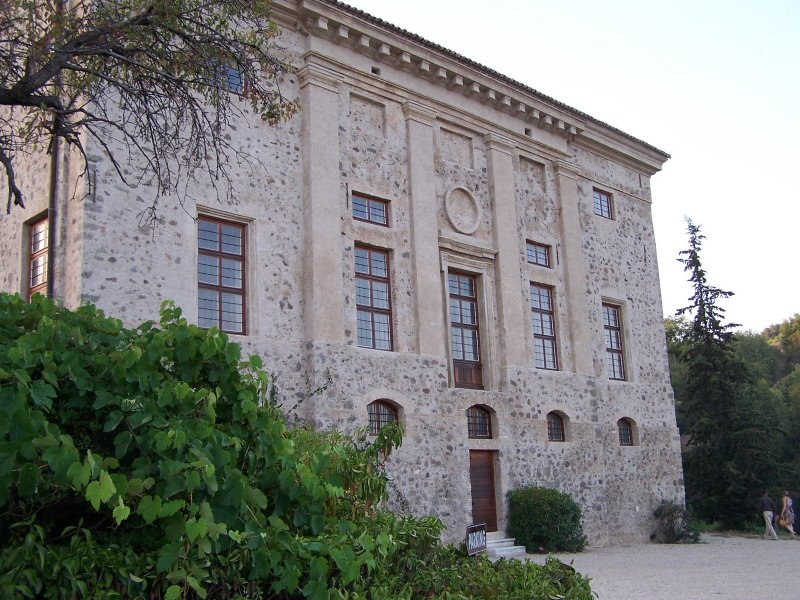
- The Château de Vaugrenier in 2007
- Interactive map of the Château de Vaugrenier area

General information
- Type: House
- Location: chemin de Vaugrenier, Villeneuve-Loubet, France
- Coordinates: 43°37′48″N 7°07′08″E

The Château de Vaugrenier, also known as the Manoir de Vaugrenier, is a historic mansion in Villeneuve-Loubet, France. It was built in the 17th and 18th centuries. It has been listed as an official historical monument by the French Ministry of Culture since 1992.
