= La Marseillaise (1869 newspaper) =

- Type: Weekly newspaper
- Founder: Henri Rochefort
- Founded: December 19, 1869
- Ceased publication: 1870
- Headquarters: Paris, France

La Marseillaise (1869–70) was a French weekly newspaper created by Henri Rochefort. It was first published on 19 December 1869. The writing staff included Paschal Grousset, Arthur Arnould, Gustave Flourens, Jules Vallès and Victor Noir. The paper was headquartered in Paris.
