= 1870 Paris uprising =

On October 31, 1870, a popular insurrection occupied Paris's City Hall (Hôtel de Ville). Amidst the Franco-Prussian War, Parisians simultaneously heard of losses at Le Bourget and Metz alongside armistice negotiations. Incensed by what they viewed as treason, a group of 300 to 400 demonstrated at the City Hall and members of the left-wing National Guard captured and occupied the building with several members of the Government of National Defense inside.

== Causes ==
Parisians were exasperated by the defeat which occurred at Le Bourget on October 30, 1870. Parisian soldiers had succeeded on October 28 in capturing the village of Le Bourget, near Paris, despite the encirclement of the capital by German troops. However, the Germans counter-attacked and retook the village. The Government of National Defense refuses an exit attempt to try and breach the enemies' deployment, or because they think the attack would have no chance of success, or because they do not want to prolong military operations. 3000 soldiers resist the shelling of prussian artillery until October 30. 1200 die on the battlefield. Some Parisians accuse the government of orchestrating the defeat. Moreover, since October 27, the government denied any rumors of capitulation of the French army, which had 100,000 men intact. Lastly, Parisians learned that the government had sent Adolphe Thiers to negotiate an armistice at Versailles with Otto von Bismarck, and they felt betrayed.

== Uprising ==
On October 31, 1870, Charles Delescluze called for the proclamation of a Commune as well as a mass uprising. That morning, working-class people from Paris' eastern neighborhoods, mixed with people from the National Guard and the bourgeois, gathered at the Place de L'Hotel de Ville. It was a spontaneous republican demonstration, without a plan set in advance.

== Bibliography ==
- Gluckstein, Donny (2006). The Paris Commune: A Revolutionary Democracy. Bookmarks. ISBN 978-1-905192-14-4.
- Winock, Michel (2011). Clemenceau (in French). Paris: Librairie Académique Perrin. ISBN 978-2-262-03498-6.
