= Louis-François Cartier =

French businessman, jeweler and watchmaker

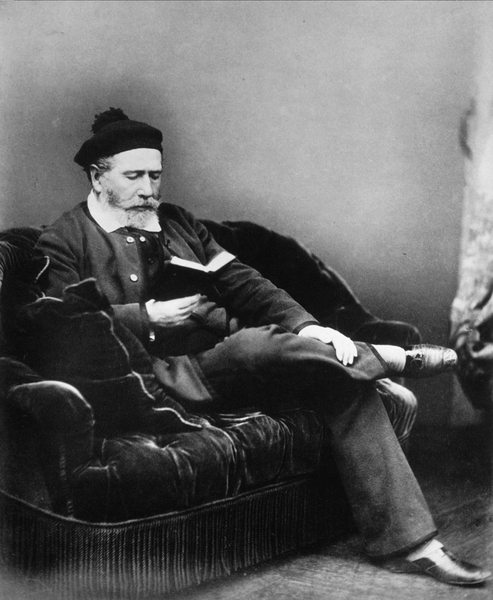
- Cartier
- Born: Louis-François Cartier; December 2, 1819; Paris, France
- Died: May 15, 1904 (aged 84); Paris, France
- Occupations: Businessman; jeweler; watchmaker
- Years active: 1847–1904
- Known for: Founding and leading Cartier
- Spouse: Antoinette Guermonprez (m. 1840)
- Children: 2, including Alfred

Louis-François Cartier (French pronunciation: [lwi fʁɑ̃swa kaʁtje]; December 2, 1819 – May 15, 1904) was a French businessman, jeweler and watchmaker. He founded the world renowned jewelry house Cartier in 1847. He was the grandfather of Pierre Cartier, who opened the Cartier Building in New York, and internationalized the brand. He was the patriarch of the Cartier family.

== Early life and education ==
Cartier was born within modest means in Paris, France to Pierre (1787–1859) and Elisabeth (née Girardin). His father was a metal worker, and his mother worked as a laundry woman. He completed a watchmaker apprenticeship under Adolph Picard.

== Career ==
In 1847, Cartier took over his employers store on Rue Montorgueil in the 2nd arrondissement, and began to develop a new strategy for the business, which mainly included to make it more attractive for clients. He began to introduce 'imaginative jewelry' as well as 'fashion and novelty items' alongside the core watchmaking business. At the time most of the timepieces were bought from other manufacturers and just sold under his name.

In 1853, Cartier moved his store to Place du Palais-Royale, in the 1st arrondissement, which was more upscale and known for luxury goods. Cartier further expands his business, next in 1859, under the regime of Napoleon III Second French Empire, as he opened a new boutique at Boulevard des Italiens. He was noted by Princess Mathilde and Empress Eugénie, which gave him the recognition, through protection provided by the Imperial family, which marked the beginnings of his international success.

The early watch designs by Cartier were an embodiment of both aesthetic and innovation that combined both jewelry and timekeeping. The attention to detail, and the understanding of both fashion and mechanics allowed Cartier to craft watches that were not only beautiful to look at but precise and reliable as instruments.

In 1874, his son Alfred, entered the family business. He enriched the product collection with Cartier watches and soon took over management from his father. Together they were able to attract clients from all the great aristocratic and cosmopolitan fortunes in the world. This was further strengthened when his son Louis, married Andrée-Caroline Worth, a daughter of Charles Frederick Worth, who owned a renowned Parisian fashion house.

== Personal life ==
On February 15, 1840, Cartier married Antoinette Guermonprez, in Paris. They had five children;

- Alfred Francois Cartier (February 17, 1841 - October 15, 1925), married to Amélie Alice Griffefeuille
- Camille Léonie (1846-?), married to Louis Prosper LeComte
