= Jacques Cartier (jeweler) =

French jeweler

Jacques-Théodule Cartier (French pronunciation: [ʒɑk teɔdyl kaʁtje]; 2 February 1884 – 10 September 1941) was a French jeweler and Cartier jewelry company executive.

== Early life ==
Cartier was born on 2 February 1884 in Paris. He was one of three sons of Alfred Cartier (1841–1925) and Amélie Alice (née Griffeuille) Cartier (1853–1914). His two brothers were Pierre Cartier and Louis Cartier. His grandfather, Louis-François Cartier had taken over the jewellery workshop of his teacher, Adolphe Picard, in 1847, thereby founding the famous Cartier jewelry company.

Cartier graduated from Collège Stanislas de Paris.

== Career ==
Jacques worked with his two older brothers to create the world-famous name and business, 'Cartier', in jewellery and watches. While Jacques opened and managed the store in London, Pierre managed the store in New York City. Jacques took charge of the London operation of Cartier in 1909 and eventually moved to the current location at 175 New Bond Street. Meanwhile, Louis was the designer who created the Cartier style known today.

The brothers divided and conquered. Cartier was very lucky in getting the recommendation of Princess Mathilde, the young cousin of Napoleon III, and this contributed to the boosting business. In the early 1900s, "Cartier became jewellers to the Rockefellers, Vanderbilts, the Fords, the Morgans, King Edward VII, King Zog of Albania, and King Chulalongkorn of Siam, who, in 1907 alone, according to Cartier biographer Hans Nadelhoffer, bought Cartier bracelets to the value of $450,000."

Through their continued successes, Louis and Pierre got married, while Jacques kept himself busy by fulfilling royal needs and desires and trips abroad in search of unique beauty in gems. Jacques went to the Persian Gulf to find the perfect pearl. He then proceeded to India, carrying jewellery of local maharajahs back to the London studio to redesign and modify for their own use. Together, Pierre and Jacques purchased a large number of pearls and precious stones from an Indian prince. The uniqueness of the pearls and stones helped with the success of their business.

Jacques ran the London store until his death in 1941. His brother Louis died the following year in July 1942. The Cartier family of jewellers relinquished control of the family business in 1964 due to the passing of Pierre.

== Personal life ==
In 1912, Cartier was married to Anna Margaretha "Nelly" (née Harjes) Gardiner (1878–1972). Nelly, who was divorced from Lion W. Gardiner of Gardiner's Island, was the mother of Mary Dorothy Gardiner (wife of Victor Louis Marie Jean Dupont) and the sister of banker Henry Herman Harjes, a partner of J.P. Morgan in France. Together, they were the parents of four children:

- Jacqueline Elma Cartier (b. 1913), who married the American, Sylvester Gardiner Prime of Shelter Island (a descendant of Nathaniel Prime), in 1939.
- Alice Cartier (b. 1915), who married Carl Nater, son of the mayor of St. Moritz, in 1945.
- Jean-Jacques Cartier (1920–2010), who married Lydia Baels (1920–1990), a daughter of Henri Baels. Lydia's sister, Lilian, Princess of Réthy was the wife of King Leopold III of Belgium.
- Alfred Harjes Cartier (1922–1974), who married Elizabeth Conn (1911–1976) in 1945.

Cartier died on 10 September 1941 in Dax, Landes in Occupied France. He was buried at the Cartier Family Mausoleum at Cimetière des Gonards in Versailles.
