= Cartier Santos =

Wristwatch line by Cartier

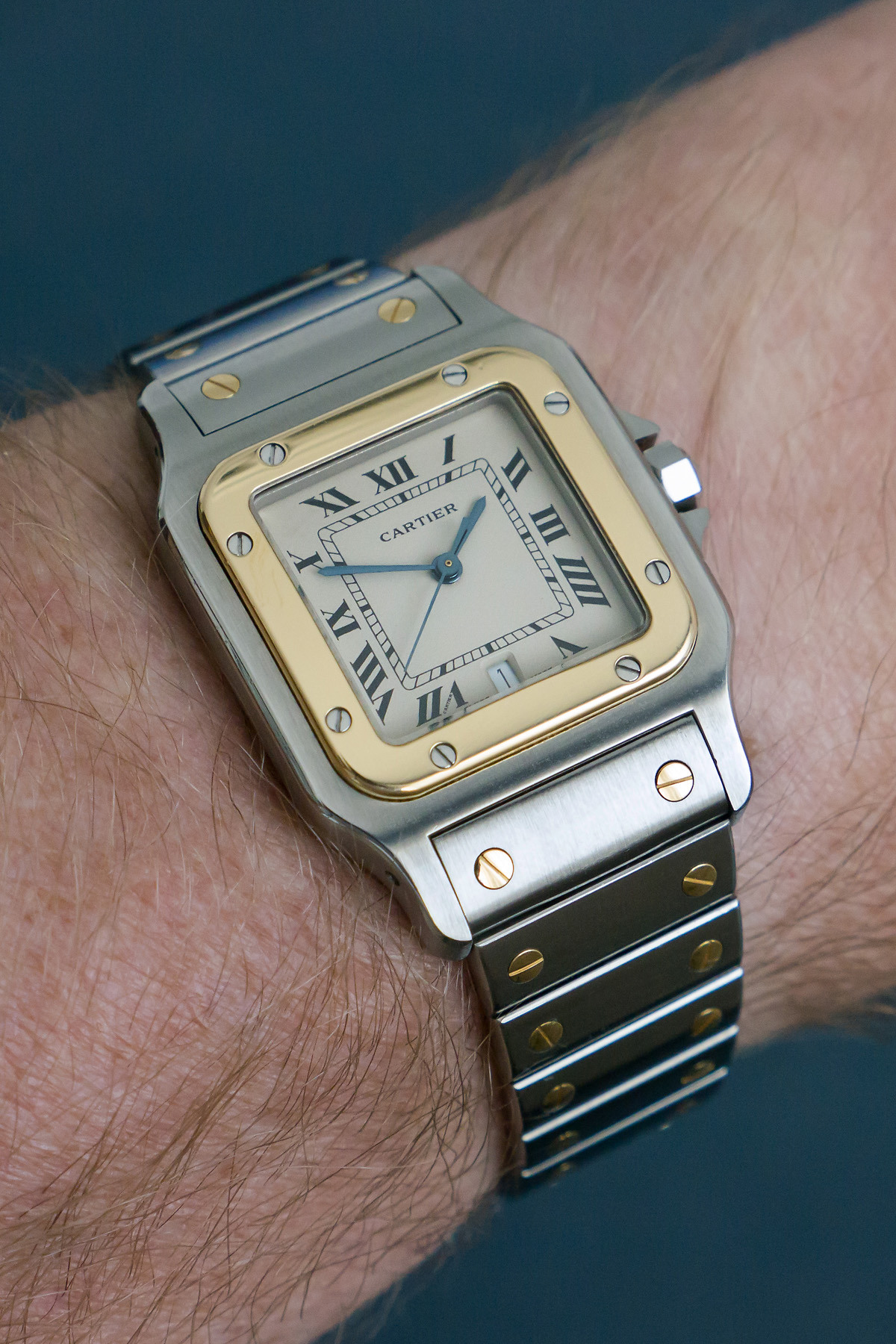
- Manufacturer: Cartier
- Type: Automatic
- Display: Analogue
- Introduced: 1911

The Santos is a line of watches made by Cartier. It was created by Louis Cartier in 1911,

== History ==
In 1904, Brazilian pioneer aviator Alberto Santos-Dumont complained to his friend Louis Cartier of the unreliability and impracticality of using pocket watches while flying. Cartier designed a flat wristwatch with a distinctive square bezel that was favored by Santos-Dumont and many other customers. This was the first and only time the brand would name a watch after its original wearer. The "Santos" watch was Cartier's first men's wristwatch.

In the 1988 film Wall Street, Michael Douglas, a symbol of the yuppie style, proudly wore a gold "Cartier Santos" watch.

== See also ==
- Cartier Tank
- Pilot watch
