= Jeanne Toussaint =

Belgian-born French jeweler (1887–1976)

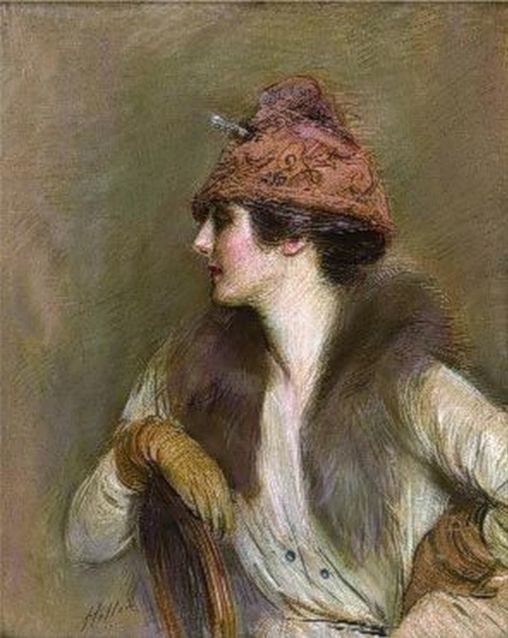
Portrait of Jeanne Toussaint by César Helleu

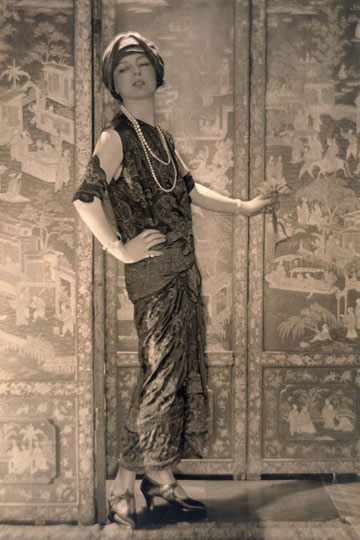
Portrait of Jeanne Toussaint by Adolph de Meyer (1920)

Jeanne Toussaint (French pronunciation: [ʒan tusɛ̃]; 1887–1976) was a Belgian-born French jeweller and fashion designer who exerted considerable influence on jewellery design after Louis Cartier appointed her Director of Fine Jewellery in 1933. She is remembered in particular for her panther designs which first appeared as a decoration for a Cartier watch in 1914 and became the theme of several creations for the Duchess of Windsor, including an onyx bracelet in 1952. Toussaint also specialized in creations inspired by the jewellery of the Moghuls and the Maharajas.

== Early life ==
Born in Charleroi, Belgium, on 13 January 1887, Jeanne Rosine Toussaint was the daughter of Edouard Victor Toussaint (1837–1894) and his wife Marie Louise née Elegeer. Together with her older sister Charlotte, she was raised in a family of lacemakers who made her aware of fashion and style from a young age. After her father died while she was still a small child, her mother fell for a German who became a member of the household, contributed to the business but abused the two daughters. They both decided to leave home, Charlotte moving to Paris while Jeanne, now 15, sought the protection of Pierre de Quinsonas, a French aristocrat who had moved to Brussels to escape military service. Hoping to marry her, he took her to Paris but his family refused permission. Nevertheless, he found an apartment for her in the centre of the city, introducing her to French society. She soon became acquainted with Coco Chanel, the illustrator George Barbier and, most importantly, Louis Cartier.

== Career ==
Cartier was enthralled with Toussaint and her taste for fashion. In 1913, he hired her to coordinate his company's accessories. By the 1920s, she had successfully designed stylish handbags for wealthy high-society figures including Marjorie Merriweather Post and Daisy Fellowes. She began a friendship with Baron Pierre Hély d’Oissel, a prosperous businessman whom she eventually married in 1954. After first being promoted to head Cartier's silver department in 1918, in 1933 Louis Cartier conferred on her full responsibility for artistic design, an area which until then he had directed himself. The first woman in the jewellery business with such an important mandate, she continued to hold the post during the Second World War while Cartier moved to the United States where he died in 1942. Although Louis Cartier had a deep romantic relationship with Toussaint, he was unable to marry her as a result of her family background.

Toussaint is remembered for her long association with panthers, living in an apartment full of panther skins and wearing a gleaming coat made of panther fur. Cartier affectionately called her "Ma petite panthère". The association extended to her designs, starting with a wristwatch in 1914 and inspiring her jewellery and accessories. In the 1940s, Toussaint moved from her earlier involvement with Art Deco into three-dimensional sculptural work, often focusing on panthers set with diamonds, emeralds and onyx. From 1948, she created several of these specifically for the Duchess of Windsor. This resulted in wider interest in Europe and North America for panther-inspired rings, earrings and pendants. She also created works based on dragonflies, ladybirds, birds of paradise, lions and tigers and an impressive brooch of a flamingo, commissioned by the Duke of Windsor for his wife in 1940. Another of her specialities was jewellery inspired by the Mughuls and the Maharajas of India. In recognition of her contribution to jewellery and design, she was awarded the Grand Cross of the Legion of Honour in 1955.

Jeanne Toussaint retired from Cartier in 1970 and died in Paris on 7 May 1976.
