= Pierre Cartier =

Pierre Cartier may refer to:

- Pierre C. Cartier (1878–1964), French jeweler
- Pierre Cartier (mathematician) (1932–2024), French mathematician
