= Cartier Tank =

Line of timepieces by Louis Cartier

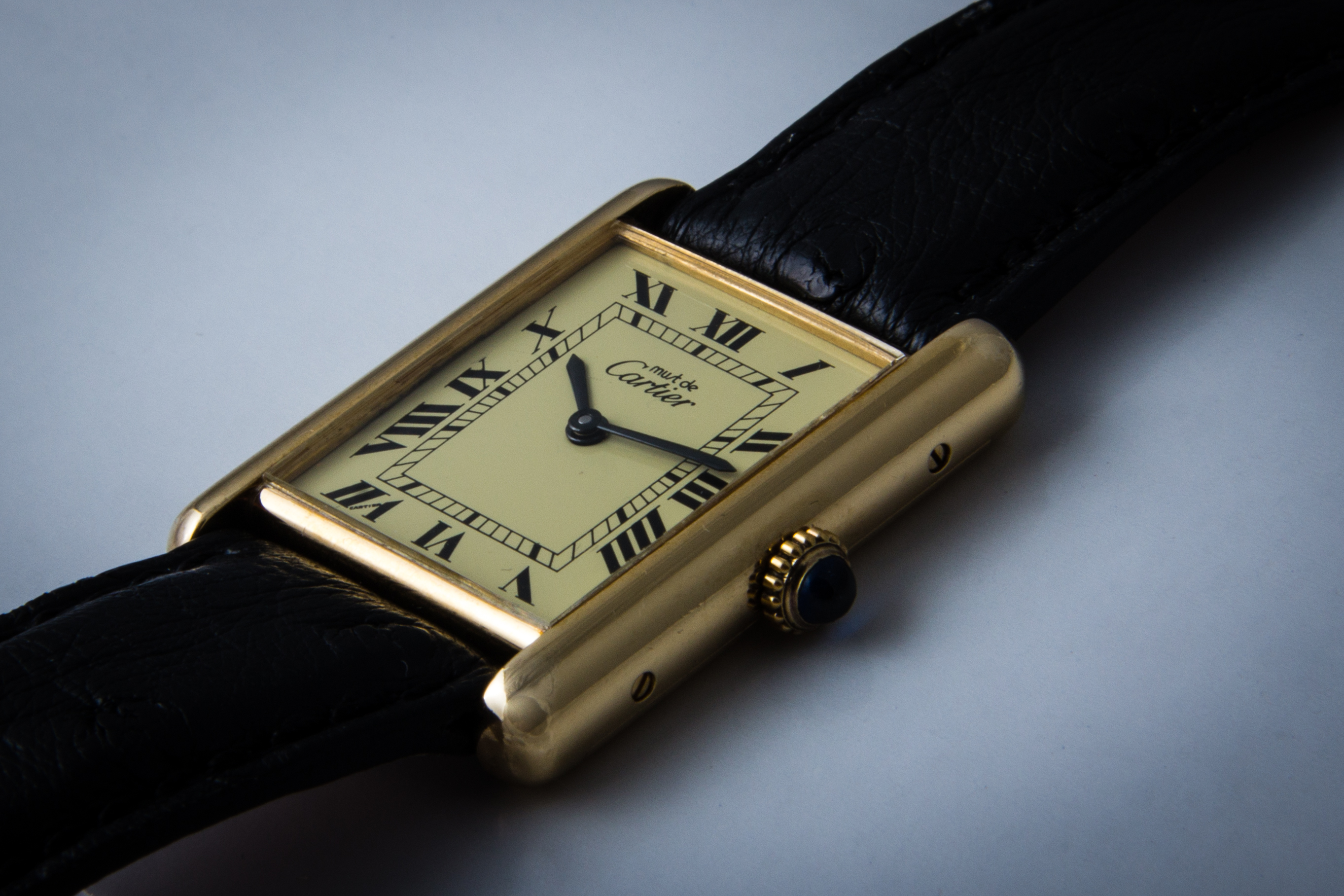
- Cartier's Tank Must model
- Manufacturer: Cartier
- Type: Dress watch
- Display: Analogue
- Introduced: 1917

The Tank is a line of watches made by Cartier. It was created by Louis Cartier in 1917, and inspired by the new Renault tanks which Cartier saw in use on the Western Front. The prototype watch was presented by Cartier to General John J. Pershing of the American Expeditionary Force.

== History ==
The Tank was introduced in 1918, and entered full production in 1919, when six pieces were built. Its lines and proportions are similar to those of tanks used on First World War battlefields. Its strap is integrated into vertical sidebars called brancards. Since its inception, variations of the watch have been released by Cartier, including the Tank Louis in 1922, the Tank Americaine in 1989, and the Tank Française in 1996. The defining features of a Tank watch include its Roman numeral dial with a chemin de fer chapter ring, sword-shaped blued steel hands, and a sapphire cabochon-surmounted crown.

The Tank has become one of the most coveted and copied wristwatches of all time, and has been worn by, amongst others, Jackie Kennedy, Princess Diana, Yves Saint Laurent and Jeff Goldblum. It is generally considered to be a watch of leaders and is suitable for wearing at any occasion. In 2016, the models produced are Tank Anglaise, Tank Louis Cartier, Tank Américaine, Tank Française, Tank MC and Tank Solo, each with several variants. In 2017, for its centenary, a model is offered with an automatic movement.

The 2020s brought a surge in demand for vintage Cartier Tank models (source). These watches have demonstrated sustained popularity among celebrities and collectors alike. In the 21st century, celebrities like Michelle Obama, Angelina Jolie, Sarah Jessica Parker, Meghan Markle, and Tom Ford have been seen wearing Cartier Tank watches.

== See also ==
- Cartier Santos
