= Alfred Cartier =

French jeweler

- Cartier, c. 1915
- Born: Alfred Louis François Cartier; February 17, 1841; Paris, Île-de-France, France
- Died: October 15, 1925 (aged 84); Paris, Île-de-France, France
- Resting place: Cimetière des Gonards
- Occupations: Businessman; jeweler
- Years active: 1874–1925
- Known for: Owning and leading Cartier
- Spouse: Amélie Alice Griffefeuille (m. 1874)
- Children: 4

Alfred Louis François Cartier (French pronunciation: [alfʁɛd lwi fʁɑ̃swa kaʁtje]; February 17, 1841 – October 15, 1925) was a French businessman, jeweler and second generation heir of the world renowned jewelry house Cartier. He is the only son of Louis-François Cartier and father of Louis, Pierre and Jacques Cartier. He was a prominent member of the Cartier family.

== Early life and education ==
Cartier was born February 17, 1841, in Paris, France to Louis-François and Antoinette (née Guermonprez) Cartier. His father was the founder of Cartier, who hailed from a modest Parisian background.

== Career ==
In 1874, Alfred took over the family business, from his father, and set his sights on the international expansion of the brand. As the sole male heir to Cartier, it became a family affair to develop the company internationally and become one of the top brands in jewelry on a global scale. His sons, Louis, Pierre and Jacques, all became involved in the family business.

== Personal life ==
In 1874, Cartier married Amélie Alice Griffefeuille. The couple had four children;

- Louis Joseph (June 6, 1875 – July 23, 1942), married on March 30, 1898, to Andrée Caroline Worth (1881-1939), which marriage was divorced and brought two children:
  - Anne Marie Andrée Louise (1900-1968, married to René Révillon:
  - René Louis Michel (1906-)

In 1924, Cartier remarried to Jacqueline Almassy, and had three more children:

  - Claude (1925-1975), married to Rita Salmona
  - Alain
  - Véronique
- Pierre Camille (March 10, 1878 - October 27, 1964), married to American heiress Elma Rumsey, had six children:
  - Marion (1912-1994) mariée à Pierre Claudel
  - Violaine
  - Dominique
  - Marie-Pierre
  - Michèle
  - Pierre
- Jacques Théodule (1884–1942), married to Anna Margaretha Nelly Harges, had four children:
  - Jacqueline
  - Alice
  - Jean-Jacques (1920-2011)
  - Harjes
- Suzanne (1885-1960), married to Jacques Worth (1882-1941), had four children:
  - Roger
  - Hélène
  - Maurice
  - Gérard
