= Cartier (brand) =

French luxury goods conglomerate

Coordinates: 48°52′12″N 2°19′19″E

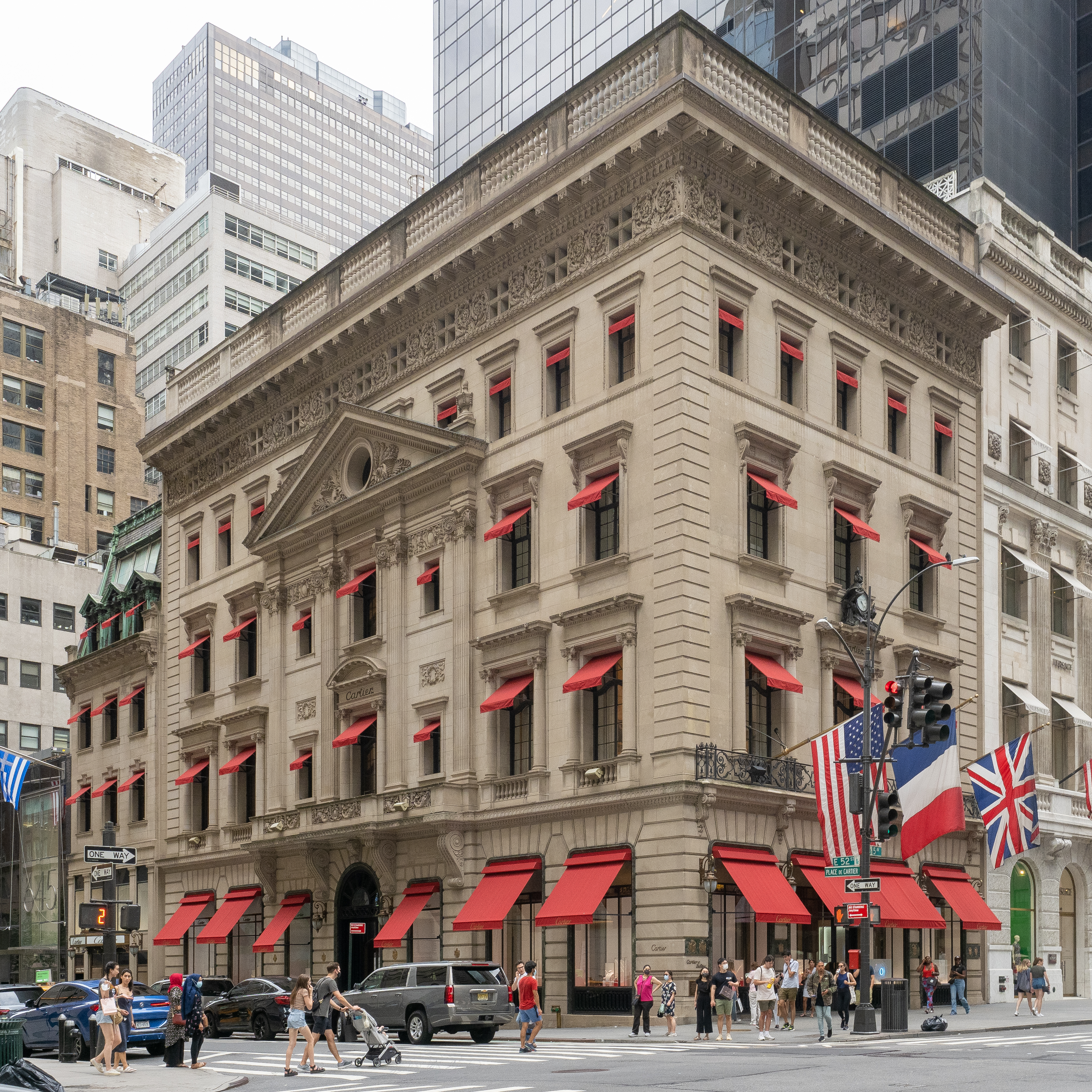
- Cartier's flagship store in Manhattan
- Type: Subsidiary
- Industry: Luxury goods
- Founded: 1847; 179 years ago
- Founder: Louis-François Cartier
- Headquarters: Paris, France
- Area served: Worldwide
- Key people: Cyrille Vigneron (CEO)
- Revenue: $6.2 billion (2020)
- Parent: Richemont
- Website: cartier.com

Cartier (/ˈkɑːrtieɪ/ KAR-tee-ay, French: [kaʁtje]) is a French luxury goods conglomerate that designs, manufactures, distributes and sells jewelry, watches, leather goods, sunglasses and eyeglasses. Founded in 1847 by Louis-François Cartier (1819–1904) in Paris, France, the company remained under family control until 1964. The company is headquartered in Paris and is currently a subsidiary of the Swiss Richemont Group, a global luxury giant. Cartier operates more than 200 stores in 125 countries, with three Temples (Historical Maisons) in Paris, London and New York City.

Cartier is regarded as one of the most prestigious manufacturers of luxury goods. Forbes ranked Cartier on its Most Valuable Brands list as 56th in 2020, with a brand value of $12.2 billion and revenue of $6.2 billion.

Cartier has a long history of sales to royalty. King Edward VII referred to Cartier as "the jeweller of kings and the king of jewellers". For his coronation in 1902, Edward VII ordered 27 tiaras and issued a royal warrant to Cartier in 1904. Similar warrants soon followed from the courts of Spain, Portugal, Serbia, Russia and the French House of Orléans. The largest-ever single order to date was made in 1925 by the Maharaja of Patiala, Bhupinder Singh, for the Patiala Necklace and other jewellery worth ₹1 billion (equivalent to ₹230 billion or €2.1 billion in 2026). Chulalongkorn graciously commanded Prince Sommot Amonphan, his Private Secretary, to issue a royal warrant appointing Cartier as an official purveyor of jewelry to the King of Siam. This followed Chulalongkorn’s private visit to the Cartier boutique in Paris during his royal visit of Europe in 1907. Subsequently, Cartier’s jewelry was exhibited at the Grand Palace during the 40th anniversary celebrations of the Chulalongkorn’s reign in 1908.

== History ==
=== Early history ===
Louis-François Cartier founded the firm in Paris in 1847 when he took over the workshop of his master, Adolphe Picard. In 1874, Louis-François' son Alfred Cartier took over the company, but it was Alfred's sons, Louis, Pierre and Jacques, who established the brand name worldwide.

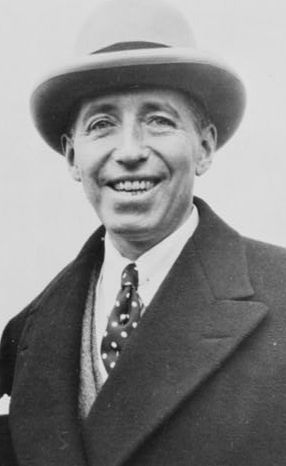
Pierre Cartier

Louis ran the Paris branch, moving to the Rue de la Paix in 1899. He was responsible for some of the company's most celebrated designs, such as the mystery clocks (a type of clock with a transparent dial and so named because its mechanism is hidden), fashionable wristwatches and exotic orientalist Art Deco designs, including the colorful "Tutti Frutti" jewels. During that time, Louis Cartier also pioneered the use of platinum in jewelry, a breakthrough innovation that enabled more intricate and delicate settings. The strength of platinum allowed for nearly invisible settings, putting the spotlight on diamonds and gemstones, and giving Cartier's creations a distinct elegance that redefined modern jewellery design.

In 1904, Brazilian pioneer aviator Alberto Santos-Dumont complained to his friend Louis Cartier of the unreliability and impracticality of using pocket watches while flying. Cartier designed a flat wristwatch with a distinctive square bezel that was favored by Santos-Dumont and many other customers. This was the first and only time the brand would name a watch after its original wearer. The "Santos" watch was Cartier's first men's wristwatch. In 1907, Cartier signed a contract with Edmond Jaeger, who agreed to exclusively supply the movements for Cartier watches. Among the Cartier team was Charles Jacqueau, who joined Louis Cartier in 1909 for the rest of his life, and Jeanne Toussaint, who was Director of Fine Jewellery from 1933.

Pierre Cartier established a New York City branch in 1909, moving in 1917 to 653 Fifth Avenue, the Neo-Renaissance mansion of Morton Freeman Plant (son of railroad tycoon Henry B. Plant), designed by architect C.P.H. Gilbert. Cartier purchased it from the Plants in exchange for $100 in cash and a double-stranded natural pearl necklace valued at the time at $1 million. By this time, Cartier had branches in London, New York and Saint Petersburg and was quickly becoming one of the most successful watch companies.

Designed by Louis Cartier, the Tank watch was introduced in 1919 and was inspired by the newly introduced tanks on the Western Front in World War I. In the early 1920s, Cartier formed a joint-stock company with Edward Jaeger (of Jaeger-LeCoultre) to produce movements solely for Cartier. Cartier continued to use movements from other makers: Vacheron Constantin, Audemars Piguet, Movado and LeCoultre. It was also during this period that Cartier began adding its own reference numbers to its watches by stamping a four-digit code on the underside of a lug. Jacques took charge of the London operations and eventually moved to the current address at New Bond Street.

=== Re-organization ===
After the death of Pierre in 1964, Jean-Jacques Cartier (Jacques's son), Claude Cartier (Louis's son), and Marion Cartier Claudel (Pierre's daughter)—who respectively headed the Cartier affiliates in London, New York, and Paris—sold the businesses.

In 1972, Robert Hocq, assisted by a group of investors led by Joseph Kanoui, bought Cartier Paris. In 1974 and 1976, respectively, the group repurchased Cartier London and Cartier New York, thus reconnecting Cartier worldwide. The new president of Cartier, Robert Hocq, coined the phrase "Les Must de Cartier" (a staff member is said to have said "Cartier, It's a must!" meaning something one simply must have) with Alain Dominique Perrin, who was a General Director of the company. As a result, in 1976, "Les Must de Cartier" became a diffusion line of Cartier, with Alain D. Perrin being its CEO.

In 1979, the Cartier interests were combined, with Cartier Monde uniting and controlling Cartier Paris, London, and New York. Joseph Kanoui became vice president of Cartier Monde. In December 1979, following the accidental death of president Robert Hocq, Nathalie Hocq (daughter of Hocq) became president.

=== Expansion into new markets ===
In the 1980s, Cartier expanded its product range with eyewear. The brand introduced its first eyewear collections using materials such as gold, platinum and buffalo horn.

=== Recent development ===
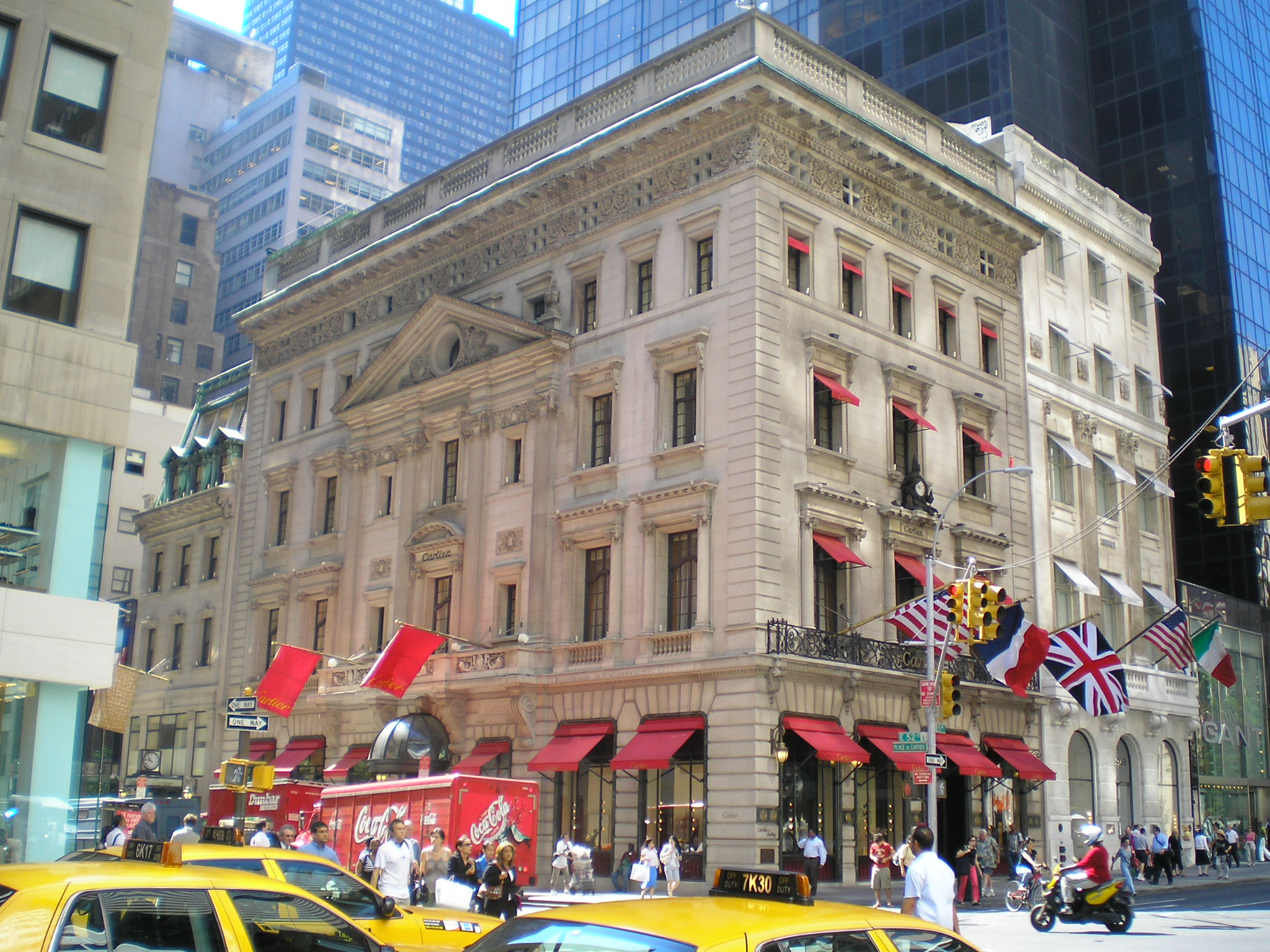
Cartier is in the former Morton F. Plant House on Fifth Avenue in New York

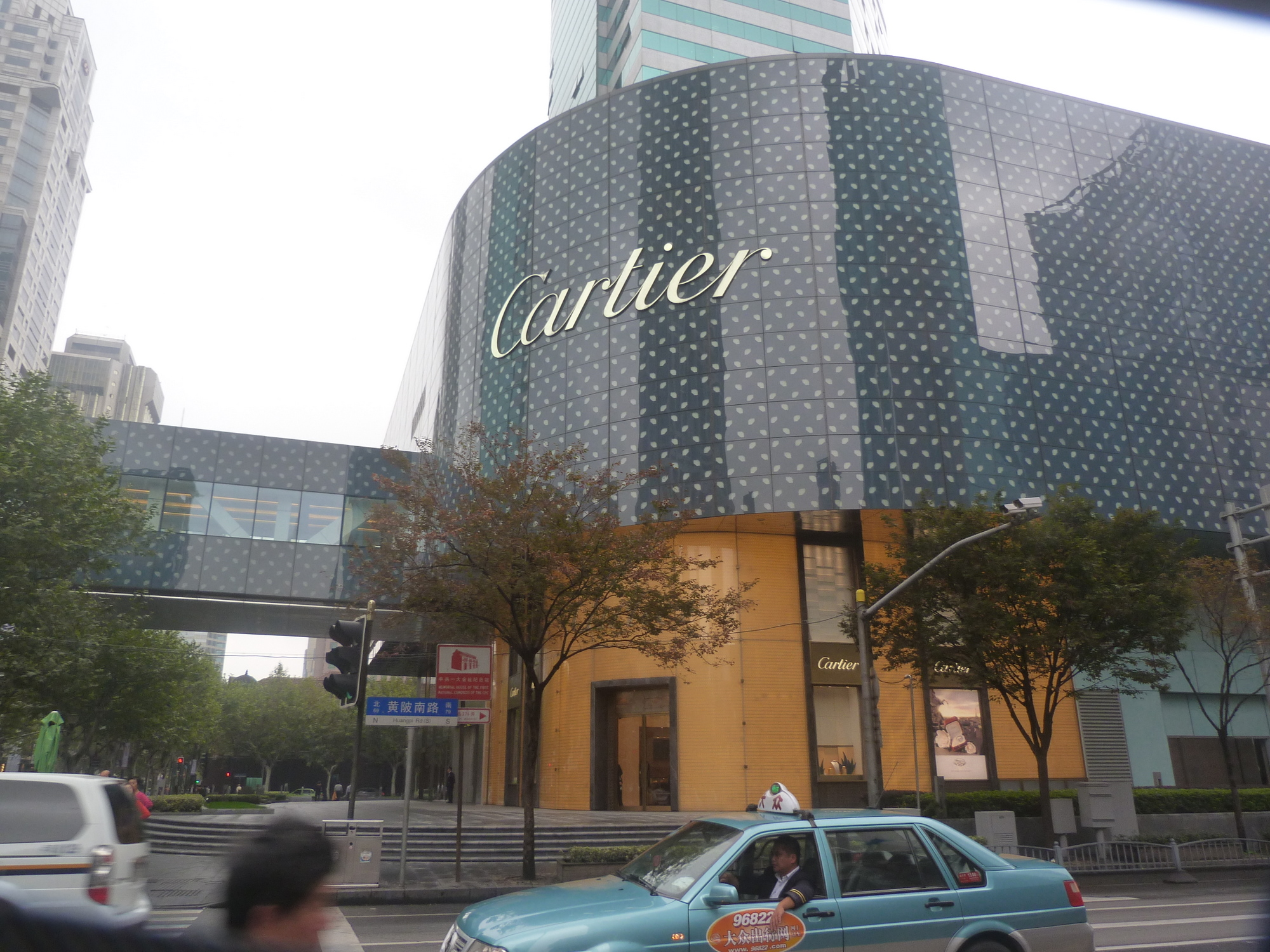
Cartier flagship store in Shanghai, China

In 1981, Alain Dominique Perrin was appointed Chairman of Cartier SAA and Cartier International. The next year, Micheline Kanoui, wife of Joseph Kanoui, became head of jewellery design and launched her first collection "Nouvelle Joaillerie." In 1984, Perrin founded the Fondation Cartier pour l'Art Contemporain to bring Cartier into the twenty-first century, by forming an association with living artists. In 1986, the French Ministry for Culture appointed Perrin head of the "Mission sur le mécénat d'entreprise" (a commission to study business patronage of the arts). Two years later, Cartier gained a majority holding in Piaget and Baume & Mercier. From 1989 to 1990, the Musée du Petit Palais staged an exhibition of the Cartier collection, "L'Art de Cartier."

Perrin founded an international committee in 1991, Comité International de la Haute Horlogerie, to organize its first salon, held on 15 April 1991; this has become an annual meeting place in Geneva for professionals in this field. The next year, the second exhibition of "L'Art de Cartier" was held at the Hermitage Museum in St Petersburg. In 1993, the "Vendôme Luxury Group" was formed as an umbrella company to combine Cartier, Dunhill, Montblanc, Piaget, Baume & Mercier, Karl Lagerfeld, Chloé, Sulka, Hackett, and Seeger.

In 1994, the Cartier Foundation moved to the Rive Gauche and opened headquarters in a building designed for it by Jean Nouvel. The next year, a major exhibition of the Cartier Antique Collection was held in Asia. In 1996, the Lausanne Hermitage Foundation in Switzerland exhibited "Splendours of the Jewellery", presenting a hundred and fifty years of products by Cartier.

As of 2012, Cartier was owned, through Richemont, by the South African Rupert family, and Elle Pagels, a 24-year-old granddaughter of Pierre Cartier.

== Timeline of notable products ==
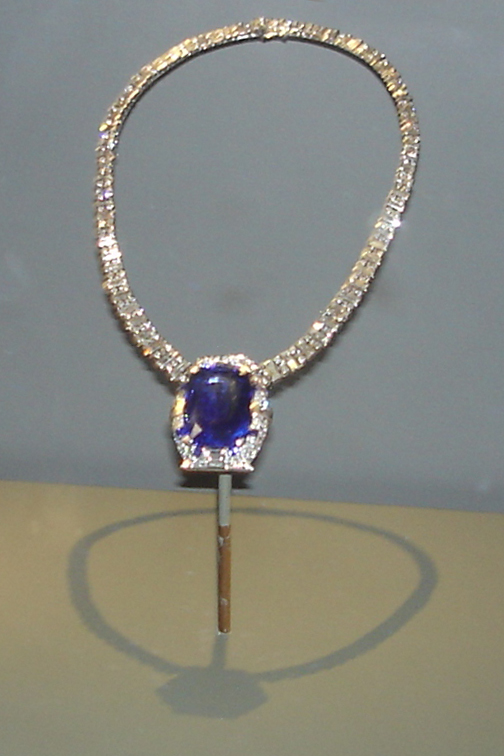
Bismarck Sapphire Necklace (1935), now at the US National Museum of Natural History

=== Watches and clocks ===
- 1911: Santos de Cartier wristwatch.
- 1919: Tank watch
- 1921: Tank cintrée watch
- 1922: Tank Louis Cartier and Tank Chinoise watches
- 1923: First portico mystery clock, crowned with a statuette called Billiken
- 1926: Baguette watch
- 1928: Tortue single push-piece chronograph watch
- 1929: Tank à guichets watch
- 1931: Mystery pocket watch
- 1932: Tank basculante watch
- 1936: Tank asymétrique watch
- 1950: Watch in the form of a ship's wheel
- 1967: New watches in London including the Crash
- 1968: Maxi Oval watch
- 1969: Cartier chronometer in a Luxury Car
- 1973: Les Must de Cartier product line of watches and accessories
- 1976: Les Must de Cartier collection of vermeil watches
- 1978: Santos de Cartier watch with a gold and steel bracelet
- 1983: Panthère de Cartier watch
- 1985: Pasha de Cartier watch
- 1989: Tank Américaine watch
- 1995: Pasha C watch in steel
- 1996: Tank Française watch collection
- 1998: Collection Privée Cartier Paris Fine Watch collection
- 2001: Roadster watch
- 2007: Ballon Bleu de Cartier watch
- 2016: Drive de Cartier watch

=== Jewelry ===
- 1933: Filed a patent for the "invisible mount", a stone-setting technique in which the metal of the mount disappears to show only the stones. This method, known as the Mystery Setting, became a signature element of Cartier's high jewelry.
- 1942: "Caged Bird" brooch, a symbol of the Occupation
- 1944: "Freed Bird" brooch to celebrate the liberation of France
- 1969: Love bracelet
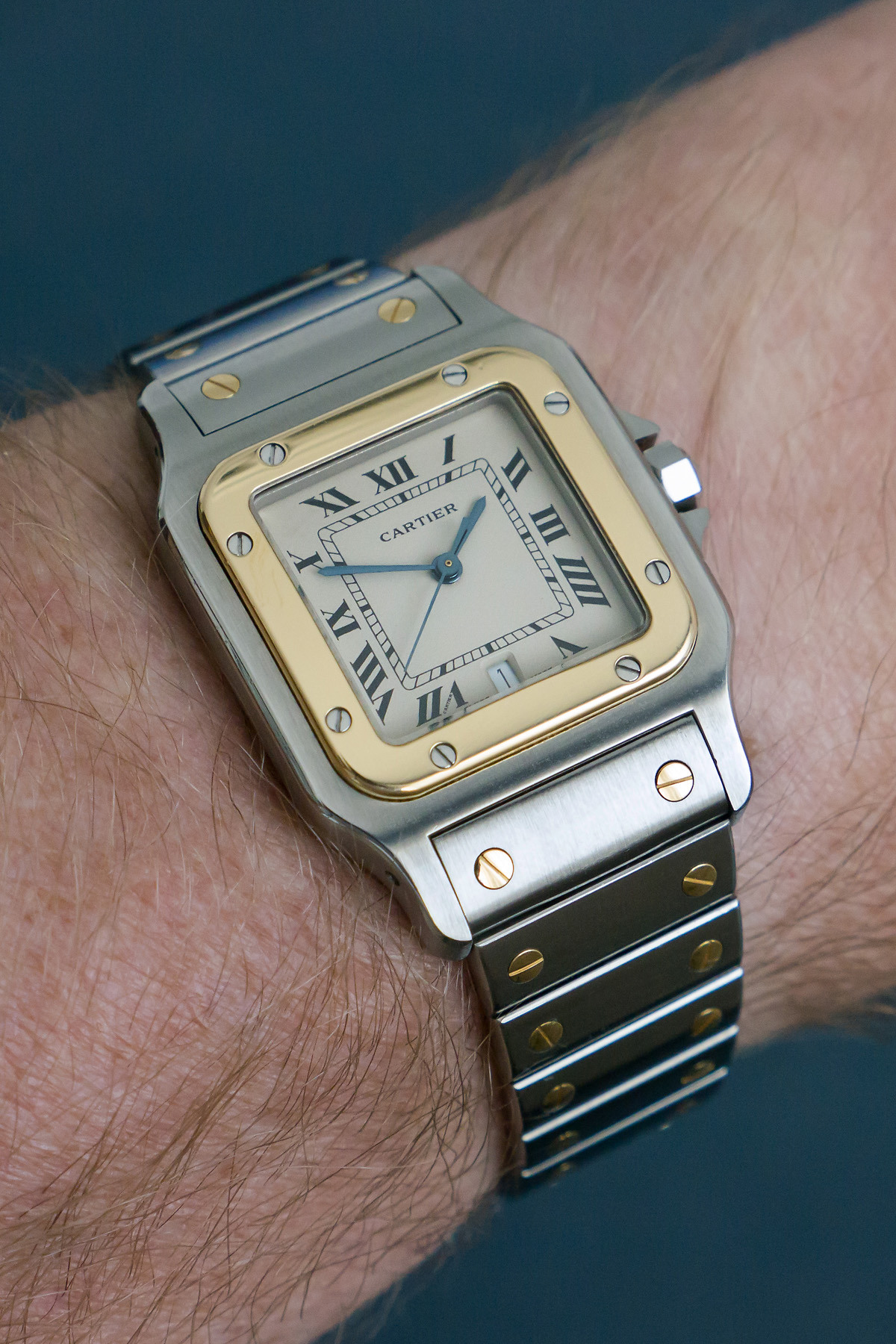
  Cartier Santos – steel/gold from 1988
- 1971: Juste un Clou bracelet
- 1982: New Jewellery collection on the theme of gold and stones
- 1984: Second New Jewellery collection on the theme of gold and pearls
- 1986: Third New Jewellery collection on the theme of the panther
- 1988: Fourth New Jewellery collection on the theme of Egypt
- 1996: Sixth New Jewellery collection on the theme of Creation
- 1996: Tank ring
- 1997: 150th anniversary necklace in the form of a serpent, paved with diamonds and set with two pear-cut emeralds of 205 and 206 carats (41.2 g)
- 1999: Paris Nouvelle Vague Cartier jewellery collection
- 2001: Délices de Cartier jewellery collection
- 2003: Le Baiser du Dragon jewellery collection
- 2003: Les Délices de Goa jewellery collection

=== Fragrances ===
- 1981: Must de Cartier
- 1981: Santos de Cartier
- 1987: Panthère de Cartier
- 1995: So Pretty de Cartier
- 2001: Eau de Cartier
- 2006: Délices de Cartier

=== Other goods ===
- 1918: Batons for French WWI Field-Marshals Ferdinand Foch and Philippe Pétain
- 1974: Leather collection in burgundy
- 1976: Oval pen
- 1978: Scarf collection
- 1980: Eyewear collection
- 1987: Les Maisons de Cartier tableware (porcelain, crystal and silver)

=== Brand heritage preservation ===
- 1983: Collection Ancienne Cartier (later the Cartier Collection) corporate archive
- 1984: Fondation Cartier pour l'Art Contemporain art foundation in Jouy-en-Josas
- 1989: The Art of Cartier major retrospective in Paris, held at the Petit Palais

== Environmental rating ==
In December 2018, World Wide Fund for Nature (WWF) released a report assigning environmental ratings to 15 major watch manufacturers and jewelers in Switzerland. Cartier (being a subsidiary of the Swiss Richemont Group) was ranked No. 2 among the 15 manufacturers and assigned an average environmental rating of "Upper Midfield," suggesting the manufacturer has taken first actions addressing the impact of its manufacturing activities on the environment and climate change. According to Cartier's official company document, the company is committed to conduct businesses "in an environmentally responsible manner" and "minimising negative environmental impacts."

== Notable patrons and owners ==
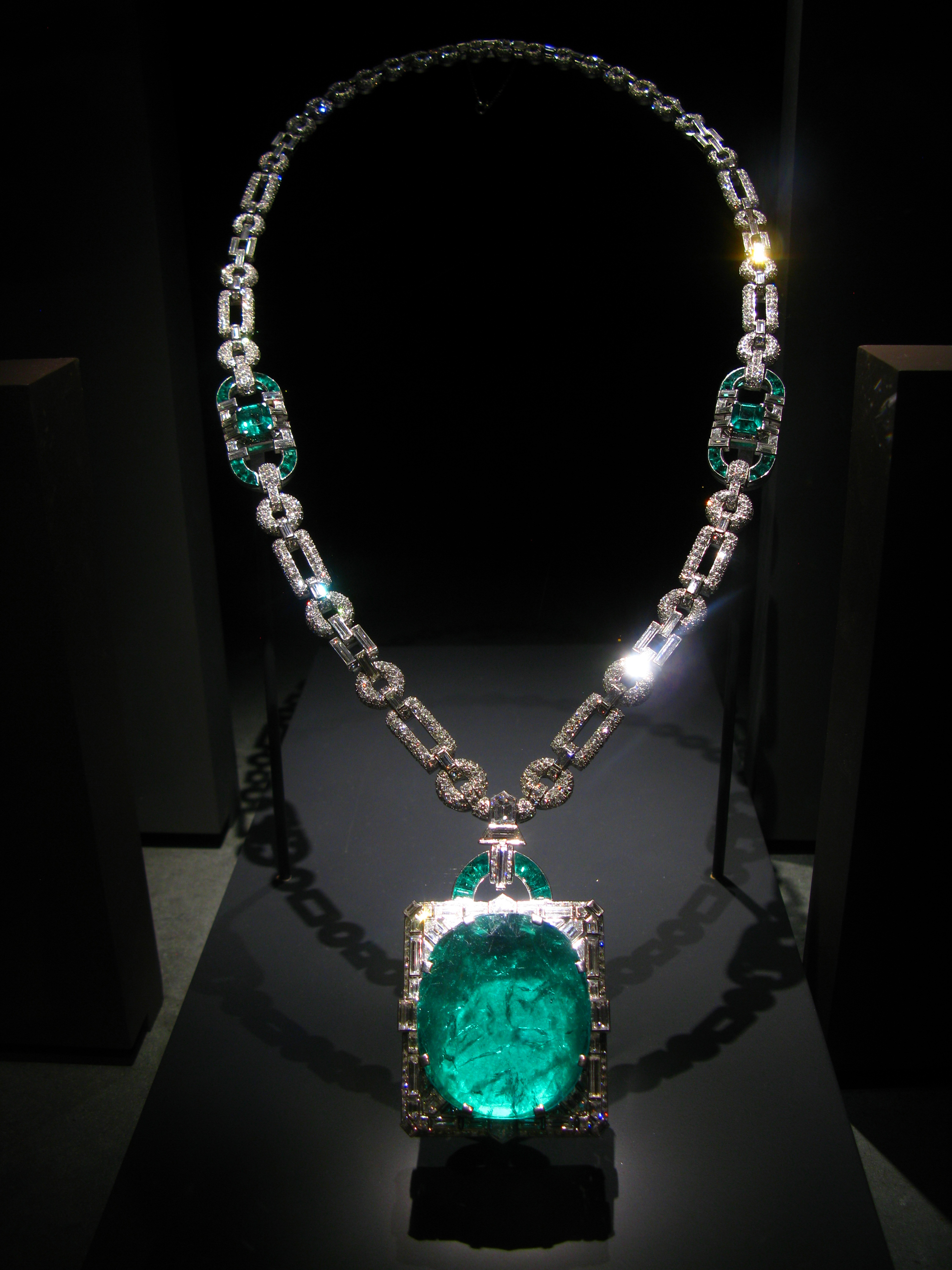
Mackay emerald and diamond necklace, 168 carats Muzo, Colombia, 1931

Numerous royal and aristocratic figures have adorned Cartier's clientele. At the turn of the 20th century, Cartier held the prestigious position as the official supplier to King Edward VII of England, Alfonso XIII of Spain, George I of Greece, Tsar Nicholas II, Queen Marie of Romania, Elisabeth of Belgium, King Zog of Albania, King Chulalongkorn of Siam, and other notable figures in Portugal, Serbia, Egypt, and Monaco. More recently, in 1997, the Prince of Wales became an esteemed patron of Cartier.

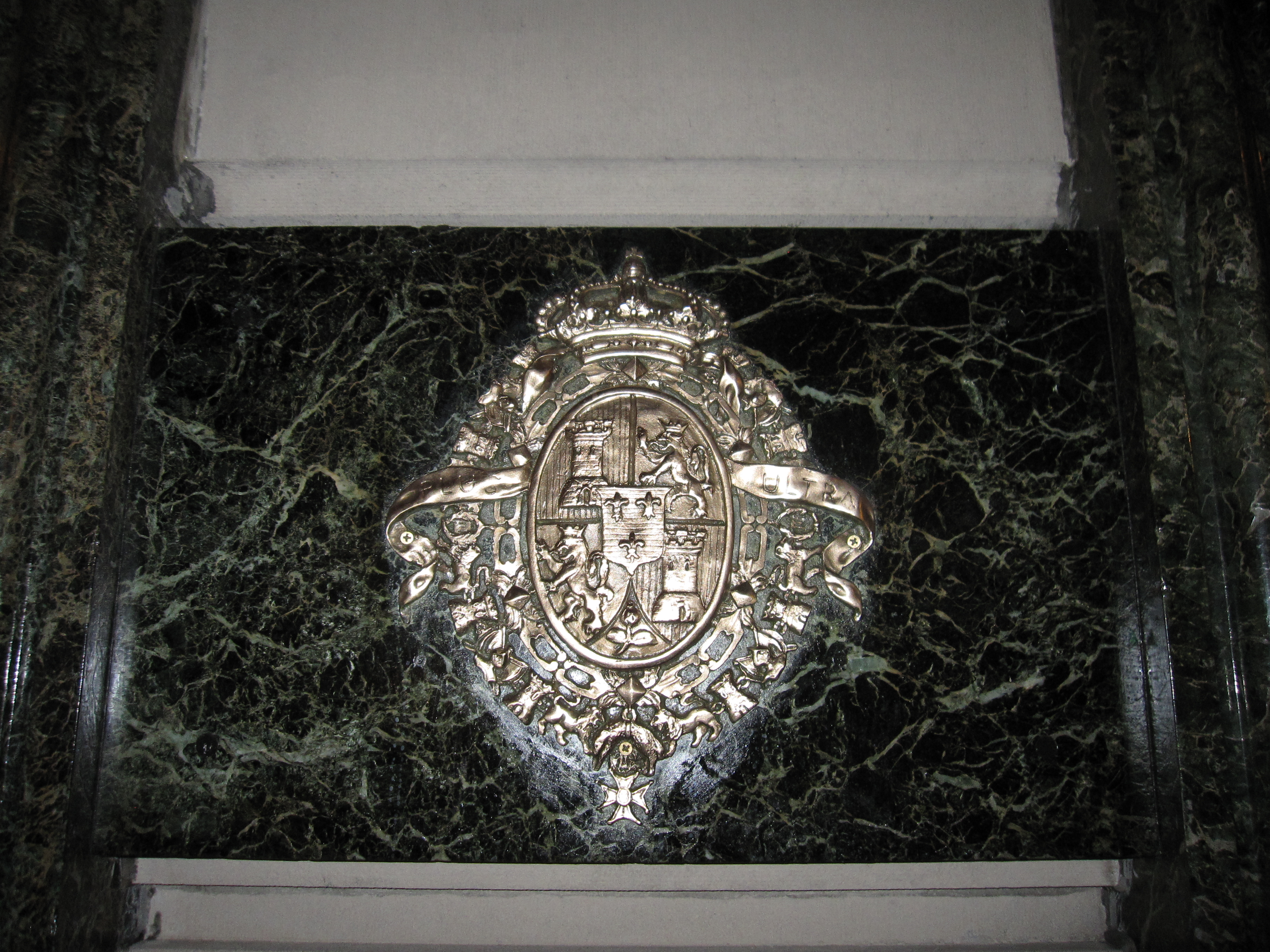
Royal Warrant of the King of Spain in Cartier, Fifth Avenue

From its inception, Empress Eugénie was a valued client of Louis-François Cartier and Alfred Cartier, which solidified the reputation of the jeweler. Princess Mathilde, a relative of Napoleon and cousin of Emperor Napoleon III, made her initial purchase in 1856 and maintained her loyalty as a customer. The diamond tiara adorned with olive leaf motifs that Princess Marie Bonaparte wore highlighted the splendor of the Bonaparte family. She wore Cartier jewelry during her marriage to Prince George of Greece. An opulent diamond necklace with red hues was commissioned for Maharaja Bhupinder Singh of Patiala, who presented it to his maharani. The Duke of Windsor commissioned jewelry for Wallis Simpson, including a "Flamingo" brooch, a "Draperie" necklace, and a three-dimensional "panther". Grace Kelly possessed a diverse collection of jewelry, including her engagement ring from Prince Rainier III in 1955, princely emblems, various brooches, and clips she wore at the birth of Prince Albert. The Duchess of Cambridge wore a Cartier tiara from 1936 on her wedding day, which was originally commissioned by King George VI for his wife and later gifted to Princess Elizabeth on her 18th birthday.

Pierre Cartier sold the "Hope" blue diamond to an American customer, Evalyn Walsh McLean, and counted actress Ève Lavallière and socialite Doris Duke among his clients. La Belle Otero wore Cartier jewelry and famously said, "A man with an account at Cartier cannot be considered ugly." Wearing Cartier during the Belle Époque was a status symbol. Elizabeth Taylor, who wrote My Love Affair With Jewelry about her collection, regularly received gifts from Richard Burton and Mike Todd. The diamond necklace that Burton repurchased from Cartier was named "Taylor – Burton". Other celebrities like Gloria Swanson and Maria Felix were also loyal clients, along with Brigitte Bardot and Yves Montand who gave gifts from Cartier.

Pablo Escobar wore Cartier watches during his rule within the Medellín Cartel in Colombia.

In the 1988 film Wall Street, Michael Douglas, a symbol of the yuppie style, proudly wore a gold "Santos" watch.

In cinema, the "Love" bracelet adorned Elizabeth Taylor's wrist in the 1973 film Ash Wednesday, and Sharon Stone wore it in the 1998 film Sphere. On stage, it was the sole jewellery worn by Tina Turner during her 1983 comeback tour.

== Use of the Cartier name in other products ==
From 1976 to 2003, the company lent its name to special editions of several models of the luxury US automaker Lincoln, designing a Cartier edition of the 1976 Lincoln Continental Mark IV, the 1977–79 Lincoln Continental Mark V, the 1980–81 Lincoln Continental Mark VI, and the 1982–2003 Lincoln Town Car.

== Books ==
- Cartier Panthère. New York: Assouline. 2015. p. 300. ISBN 9781614284284.
- Nadelhoffer, Hans (2025). Cartier. Chronicle Books. ISBN 9780811860994.
- The Cartiers by Francesca Cartier Brickell

== See also ==
- Cartier Love Bracelet
- Cartier Racing Award
- Cartier Tank
- Fondation Cartier pour l'Art Contemporain
- List of watch manufacturers
