= Pierre C. Cartier =

French jeweler (1878–1964)

Pierre Cartier
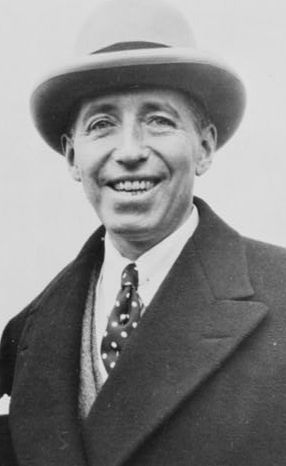
- Cartier in 1926
- Born: Pierre Camille Cartier; March 10, 1878; Paris, France
- Died: October 27, 1964 (aged 86); Geneva, Switzerland
- Occupations: Businessman, jeweler
- Known for: Owning and leading Cartier
- Spouse: Elma Rumsey (m. 1908; died 1959)
- Children: 6
- Parents: Alfred Cartier; Amélie Alice Griffeuille
- Family: Jacques Cartier (jeweler) (brother); Louis Cartier (brother)

Pierre Camille Cartier (French pronunciation: [pjɛʁ kamij kaʁtje]; March 10, 1878 – October 27, 1964) was a French jeweler. He was one of three sons of Alfred Cartier and the brother of Jacques Cartier and Louis Cartier. Pierre's grandfather, Louis-François Cartier had taken over the jewelry workshop of his teacher Adolphe Picard, in 1847, thereby founding the famous Cartier jewelry company.

== Early life and education ==
Cartier was born March 10, 1878, in Paris, France, the second-eldest son of jeweller and Cartier founder Alfred Louis Francois Cartier (1841–1925) and his first wife Amélie Alice (née Grifeuille).

== Career ==
In 1902, Pierre opened and began to manage the London Cartier store and in 1909, he opened the New York store, moving it in 1917 to the current location of 653 Fifth Avenue, the neo-Renaissance mansion of banker Morton Plant. After the death of his brothers in 1942, Pierre based his shop in Paris until he retired to Geneva in 1947.

Cartier became the owner of the Hope Diamond and on January 28, 1911 sold it to Edward B. McLean. In a deal concluded in the offices of the McLean family's Washington Post newspaper, Pierre Cartier sold the diamond for US$180,000 (equivalent to $5,886,000 in 2023). A clause in the sale agreement for the diamond, that was widely believed to bring death and disaster to its owner, stated that "Should any fatality occur to the family of Edward B. McLean within six months, the said Hope diamond is agreed to be exchanged for jewelry of equal value". By March, the diamond had not been paid for in accordance with the terms in the sale agreement. Cartier hired a lawyer to sue McLean for payment, who responded by saying it was on a loan for inspection. On February 2, 1912, the New York Times ran a story with the headline: "Wealthy Purchasers of Famous Stone to Retain It Despite Sinister Reputation."

== Personal life ==
On July 13, 1908, he married American-born Elma Rumsey, in the 16th arrondissement of Paris, France. She was a daughter of Moses Rumsey, Jr., a wealthy pump industrialist, hailing from Saint Louis, Missouri. The family was described as being wealthier than the Cartiers at the time, and the marriage being a useful alliance. Elmas social circle included the Morgans, Roosevelts and the McLeans. The couple had six children, including Marion Rumsey Cartier (April 4, 1911 – March 20, 1994).
