= Cartier Building =

Commercial building in Manhattan, New York

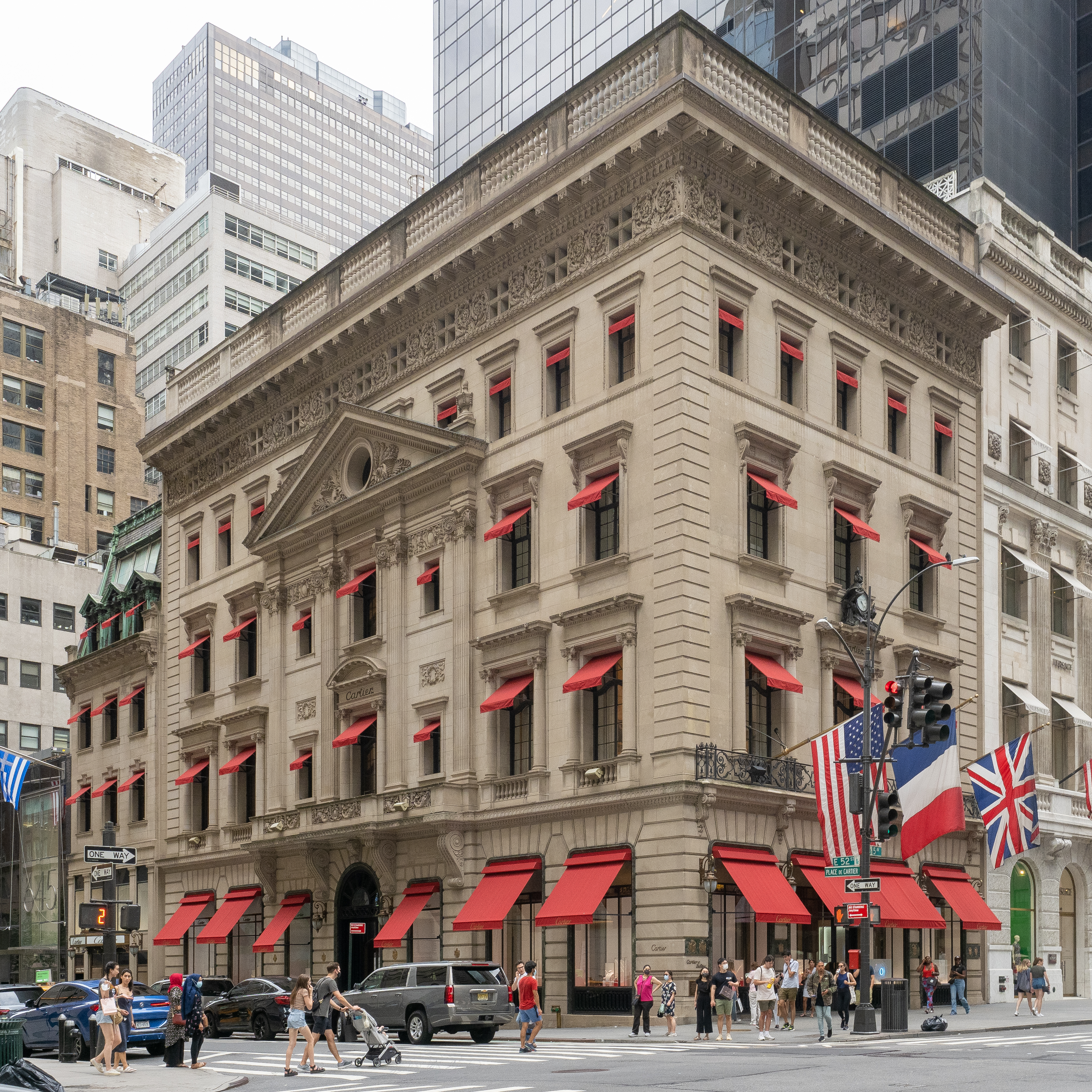
- Interactive map of the Cartier Building area

General information
- Architectural style: Neoclassical
- Location: 651–653 Fifth Avenue and 4 East 52nd Street; Manhattan, New York
- Coordinates: 40°45′34″N 73°58′34″W
- Opened: 1905
- Renovated: 2000–2001; 2014–2016
- Client: Morton Freeman Plant and Edward Holbrook

Technical details
- Floor count: 5

Design and construction
- Architects: Robert W. Gibson (651 Fifth Avenue); Charles P. H. Gilbert (4 East 52nd Street)

Renovating team
- Architects: Jean-Michel Wilmotte, Timothy P. Greer, David Schwartz (2000–2001); Thierry W. Despont, Beyer Blinder Belle (2014–2016)

U.S. National Register of Historic Places
- Designated: September 8, 1983
- Reference no.: 83001733
- Designated entity: Houses at 647, 651–53 Fifth Avenue and 4 East 52nd Street

New York State Register of Historic Places
- Designated: August 8, 1983
- Reference no.: 06101.000406

New York City Landmark
- Designated: July 14, 1970
- Reference no.: 0271
- Designated entity: Cartier (651 Fifth Avenue, 4 East 52nd Street)

The Cartier Building, also 653 Fifth Avenue, is a commercial building on the southeast corner of 52nd Street and Fifth Avenue in the Midtown Manhattan neighborhood of New York City. The building serves as the flagship store of Cartier in New York City. It consists of two conjoined residences completed in 1905: the Morton F. Plant residence at 651–653 Fifth Avenue, designed by Robert W. Gibson, and the Edward Holbrook residence at 4 East 52nd Street, designed by C. P. H. Gilbert.

The Plant House was designed in the Neo-Renaissance style and has facades on both 52nd Street and Fifth Avenue. The 52nd Street facade of the house contains an ornate pavilion, and both facades have an attic hidden inside a frieze. The Edward Holbrook House was also designed in a neoclassical style but has a mansard roof. Both houses are five stories tall and are connected internally. The Cartier store takes up all of the stories inside the building.

The southeast corner of Fifth Avenue and 52nd Street was planned as a hotel in the early 1900s after the Roman Catholic Asylum vacated the site. After the Vanderbilts blocked the development of the hotel, the northern portion became the Morton F. Plant House, while the southern portion of the site was developed as the Marble Twins at 645 and 647 Fifth Avenue. In the late 1910s, Plant sold his house to Cartier. The Holbrook House was occupied by a variety of tenants until 1927, after which it was purchased by 653 Fifth Avenue's owners and used by various organizations and firms. The New York City Landmarks Preservation Commission designated the Cartier Building as a city landmark in 1970, and it was added to the National Register of Historic Places in 1983 along with 647 Fifth Avenue.

== Site ==
The Cartier Building is in the Midtown Manhattan neighborhood of New York City. It is along the southeast corner of Fifth Avenue to the west and 52nd Street to the north. The land lot is L-shaped and covers 8,055 square feet (748.3 m^{2}), with a frontage of 50 feet (15 m) on Fifth Avenue and a maximum depth of 130 feet (40 m). The lot includes 651–653 Fifth Avenue, measuring 50 feet along Fifth Avenue and 100 feet (30 m) on 52nd Street, and the adjacent 4 East 52nd Street to the east, measuring 30 feet (9.1 m) on 52nd Street and 100 feet (30 m) deep. The building is on the same block as 647 Fifth Avenue and the Olympic Tower to the south, as well as 11 East 51st Street and 488 Madison Avenue to the east. Other nearby buildings include 650 Fifth Avenue to the west, 660 Fifth Avenue to the northwest, Austrian Cultural Forum New York to the north, 12 East 53rd Street and Omni Berkshire Place to the northeast, St. Patrick's Cathedral to the south, and the International Building of Rockefeller Center to the southwest.

Fifth Avenue between 42nd Street and Central Park South (59th Street) was relatively undeveloped through the late 19th century. The surrounding area was once part of the common lands of the city of New York. The Commissioners' Plan of 1811 established Manhattan's street grid with lots measuring 100 feet (30 m) deep and 25 feet (7.6 m) wide. Upscale residences were constructed around Fifth Avenue following the American Civil War. In 1882, three Vanderbilt family residences were completed along Fifth Avenue between 51st and 59th Streets (the William H., William K., and Cornelius II mansions). The surrounding section of Fifth Avenue thus became known as "Vanderbilt Row". By the early 1900s, that section of Fifth Avenue was becoming a commercial area.

The site immediately north of St. Patrick's Cathedral was owned by the Roman Catholic Archdiocese of New York, which used the site for the Roman Catholic Asylum. The asylum took up two blocks between 51st Street, 52nd Street, Fifth Avenue, and Park Avenue. It was once one of several public institutions on the midtown section of Fifth Avenue, but by the end of the 19th century, it was the only one remaining. The Roman Catholic Asylum site was placed for sale in 1899 after the institution had secured another site in the Bronx.

== Architecture ==
The Cartier Building, the main New York City store of jeweler Cartier, consists of the Morton F. Plant House at 651–653 Fifth Avenue and the Edward Holbrook House at 4 East 52nd Street. The Plant House was designed by architect Robert W. Gibson in the Neo-Renaissance style for Morton Freeman Plant, a financier who was the son of railroad tycoon Henry B. Plant. The Holbrook House was designed by C. P. H. Gilbert for Edward Holbrook, who was president of the Gorham Manufacturing Company in the 1900s. The two houses comprise the Cartier Building and have been joined internally since the 1920s.

=== Facade ===
==== Morton F. Plant House ====
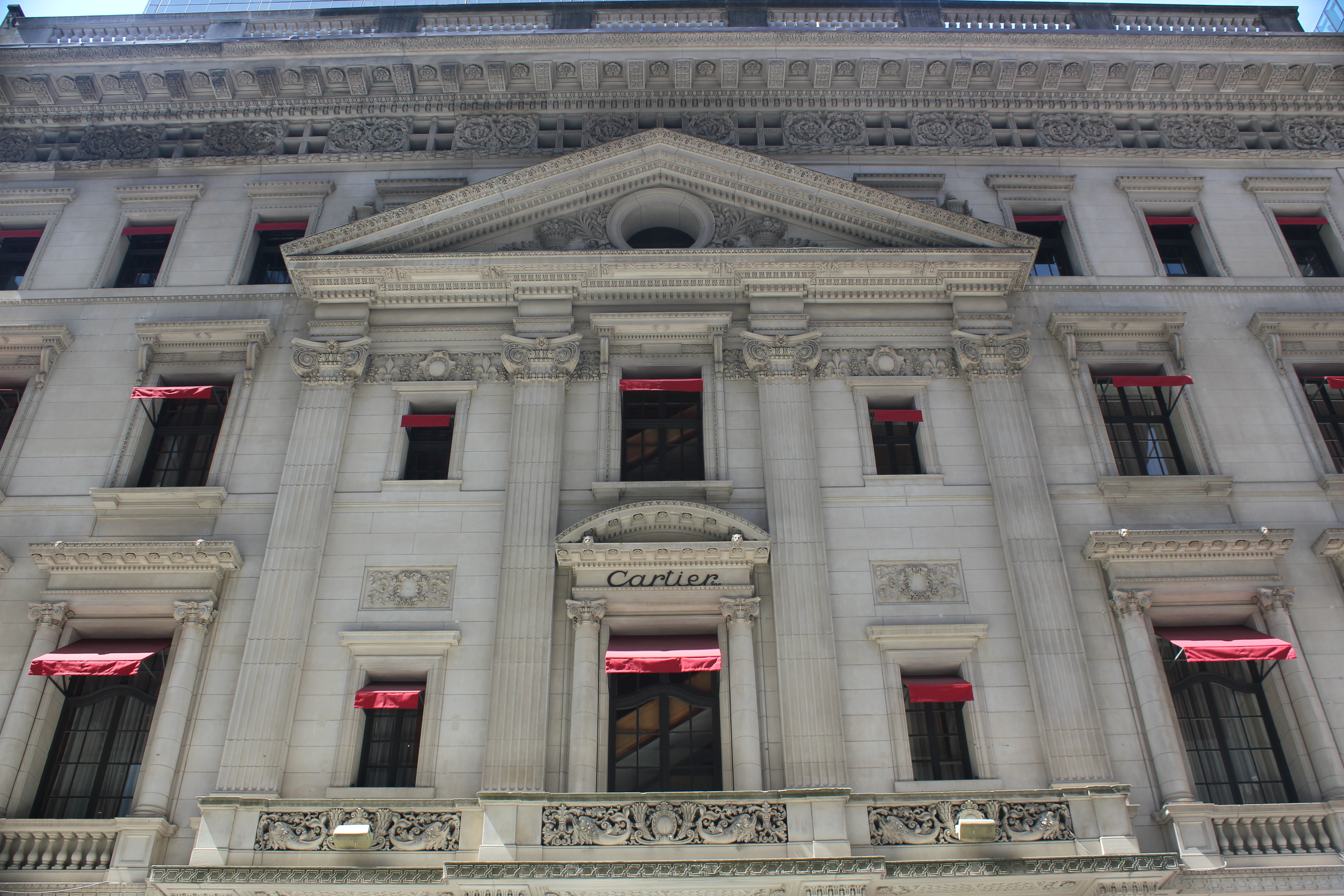
Central pavilion on 52nd Street

The Morton F. Plant House at 651–653 Fifth Avenue has frontage on both 52nd Street and Fifth Avenue. The facade along Fifth Avenue is three bays wide and, at the ground floor, contains a large opening surrounded by blocks of rusticated limestone. The facade along 52nd Street also has a rusticated limestone facade and contains seven vertical bays, with an arched entrance in the center bay. The 52nd Street entrance was the original main entrance to the house, which was known initially as 2 East 52nd Street. The ground-story openings are square-headed, except for an arched opening at the center, which was the carriage entrance. The main entrance on 52nd Street was restored as part of a 2001 renovation, while the display windows on the first floor were downsized. As part of that project, a secondary doorway was built on Fifth Avenue.

At the second and third stories on 52nd Street, the central three bays form a slightly projecting pavilion, with an ornate balustrade in front of the second-story windows. The center window on the second story of the pavilion has engaged columns, which support a curved pediment. The pavilion also contains four pilasters separating the windows on the second and third stories; the pilasters are fluted and contain Scamozzi capitals at their tops. The pilasters support a pediment at the fourth story.

On either side of the central pavilion, there are two windows on each of the second and third stories on 52nd Street, as well as three similarly designed windows on each story on Fifth Avenue. The second-story windows have individual balustrades at the bottom and are flanked by engaged columns that support lintels with denticulation. The center window on Fifth Avenue has a clock above it. The third-story windows are topped by denticulated lintels supported by brackets. On the fourth story, there are six windows on 52nd Street (three on each side of the pavilion) and five on Fifth Avenue. These windows are simpler in design and contain lintels above them. The fifth-story attic has a frieze within which are small window openings. A cornice with modillions, as well as a balustrade, runs above the attic. During the December holiday season, the facade of the mansion is wrapped with a large red ribbon.

==== Edward Holbrook House ====
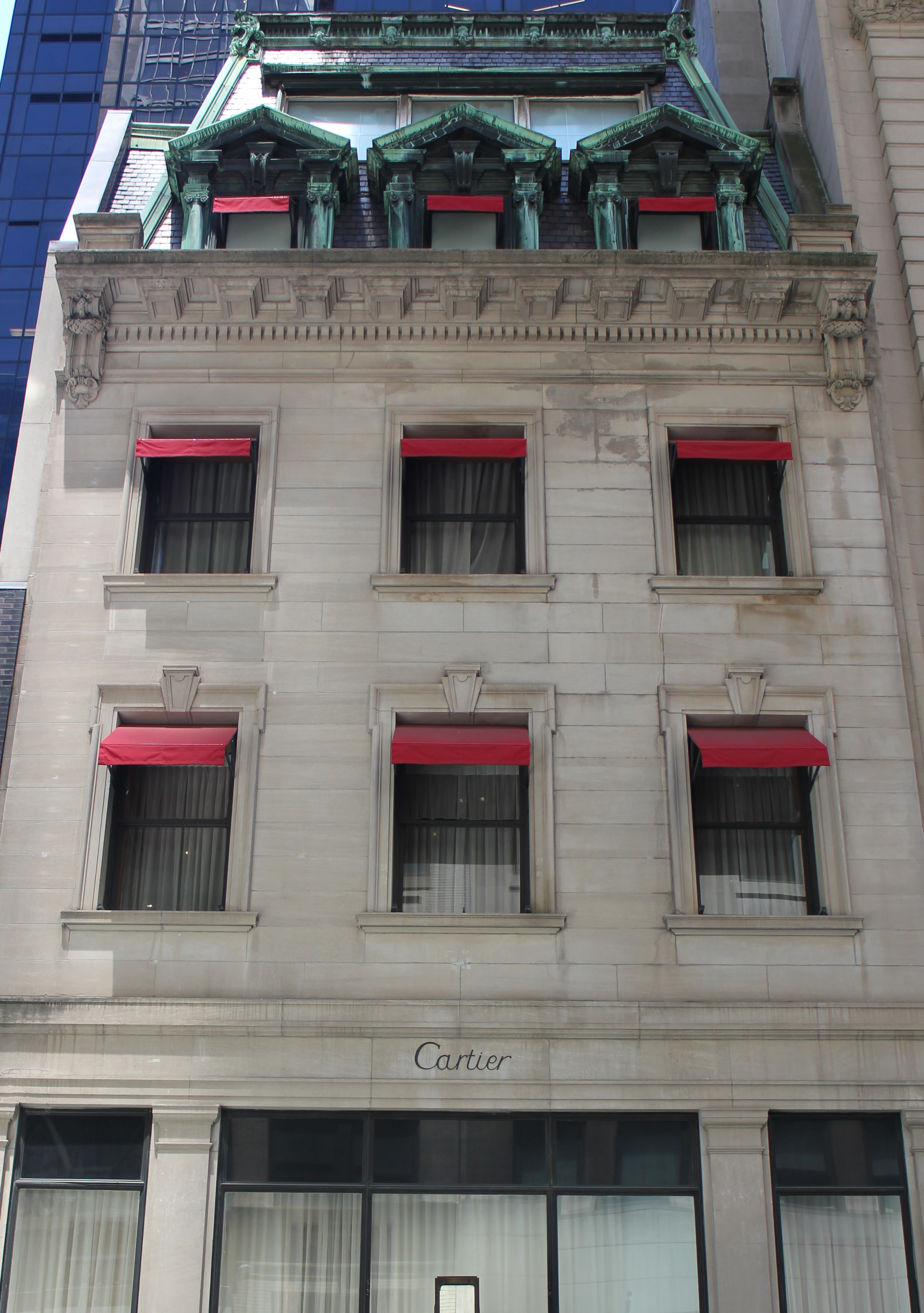
Detail of the Holbrook House facade

4 East 52nd Street comprises the Edward Holbrook House, which is internally joined to the Morton F. Plant House. This house is five stories tall and has a neoclassical design. The limestone facade is divided into three bays. At the lowest two stories, there are plate glass windows and the center bay is wider than the other two bays. There is a projecting marquee and a clock above the center bay of the first story, while the outer bays have light fixtures. The original entrance at the Edward Holbrook House was removed when Cartier moved into the building in the 1920s. The current entrance was installed in a 2000 renovation.

The third and fourth stories each contain three windows with molded surrounds. The third-story windows are topped by keystones, while a cornice with modillions, dentils, and brackets runs above the fourth story. The fifth story contains a mansard roof with a skylight and three stone dormers.

=== Features ===
As designed, the Plant House was supposed to have a large dining room, drawing room, and smoking annex on the ground floor, as well as a library and music room on the second floor, connected by a circular grand staircase. The east side of the second story had Plant's piano room, which contained a coffered ceiling. The west side of the second story had Pierre C. Cartier's private offices. The second floor also had a salon with wooden paneling.

After Cartier moved into the Plant House, it made some changes. The Cartier store occupied the first two stories of the Plant House while offices were placed on the upper floors. A second-story mezzanine, built in 1917 and demolished in 2001, had cabinet doors containing leather bindings on the edges. Following a 2016 renovation, the Cartier store was expanded to 44,000 square feet (4,100 m^{2}) on five floors, with an interior stairway connecting all the stories.

The modern first floor is designed as an imitation of a residential mansion. The restored interior has a lacquered panel in the foyer, with representations of panthers in gold leaf, as well as oak paneling on the walls. The second floor contains salesrooms for fine jewelry, in addition to a hospitality suite with a private dining room. The third floor contains selling space for watches and jewelry,. and there are also bridal rooms with rose quartz lights and pink velvet accents. The fourth floor is used for perfume sales, and it includes marquetry panels with various Cartier motifs. In addition, there are four salons, each of which is decorated to represent New York City during different seasons, and there is a terrace facing Fifth Avenue. The store is decorated throughout with site-specific art, such as a travertine-and-quartz wall resembling the city's skyline and a sculpture resembling necklace owned by Morton F. Plant.

== History ==
In October 1899, the Roman Catholic Asylum sold much of the city block bounded by Fifth Avenue, 52nd Street, Madison Avenue, and 51st Street, then moved to the Bronx. The sale was valued at $2.5 million and included the lots on the east side of Fifth Avenue between 51st and 52nd Streets, as well as those on the side streets. George R. Sheldon and Charles T. Barney were reported as the purchasers; Barney, who was the president of Knickerbocker Trust Company, represented a syndicate of several unnamed investors. In the subsequent months, many of the lots along 51st and 52nd Streets were sold to families, though one lot was sold to the Union Club of the City of New York. The single-family lots were sold under the stipulation that they would remain in residential use for 25 years. By May 1900, only the lots along Fifth Avenue remained unsold.

=== Residential use ===
==== Construction ====
Edward Holbrook bought a 50-by-100-foot (15 by 30 m) lot on the south side of 52nd Street, just east of Fifth Avenue, from Worthington Whitehouse in August 1900. That December, Holbrook bought the 30-by-100-foot (9.1 by 30.5 m) lot immediately to the east from Lansdale Boardman. Holbrook hired C. P. H. Gilbert to construct a 14-story apartment house on the 50-foot lot, along with a private house for Holbrook's use on the 30-foot lot.

Meanwhile, the firm of Flake & Dowling bought the site at the southeast corner of 52nd Street and Fifth Avenue from Sheldon and Barney in 1900, paying $750,000 for the site. They also bought some land on the south side of 52nd Street from Henry G. Trevor and George R. Schieffelin. Flake & Dowling resold the 100-by-125-foot (30 by 38 m) sites in February 1901, and a group of developers led by Stewart H. Chisholm had taken over the site by that spring. That October, Chisholm's syndicate filed plans for an 18-story apartment hotel, designed by William C. Hazlett, to be built on that site. The plans for Chisholm's hotel prompted concerns from the Vanderbilt family, which lived on Fifth Avenue and did not want to see a high-rise hotel development opposite their houses.

In March 1902, after the corner site had been excavated, Chisholm sold the site to the New York Realty Corporation, which was acting on behalf of the Vanderbilt family. The Real Estate Record and Guide described the sale as "a peculiar transaction, and one which can hardly be called a sale". The Vanderbilts sold the northern section of the plot, facing 52nd Street and measuring 50 by 100 feet (15 by 30 m), to Morton F. Plant. Plant paid $350,000 (a $50,000 discount from the Vanderbilts had paid for the site) and was required to use the structure exclusively as a residence for 25 years. The Vanderbilts were unable to obtain a buyer for the southern section, which was in the middle of a city block. Holbrook canceled plans to build his apartment hotel in August 1902 after agreeing with the Vanderbilts to restrict their respective lots to private residential development. The following month, when George W. Vanderbilt announced plans for marble townhouses at 645 and 647 Fifth Avenue, the Vanderbilt family was confirmed to be associated with the New York Realty Corporation.

Holbrook did build a 5-story residence on the eastern site of the lot at 8 East 52nd Street, but he sold it to Ernest Kempton Adams. Gilbert designed a six-story residence for Holbrook on the western side of his 52nd Street lot, which would have been the site of the apartment hotel. In December 1902, Robert W. Gibson was announced as the architect for Morton Plant's residence. Gibson filed plans for Plant's house with the New York City Department of Buildings in May 1903; the plans called for a five-story limestone house to cost $300,000. Gilbert filed plans that November for Holbrook's house, which was to be a six-story limestone structure costing $95,000. Plant's residence at 651–653 Fifth Avenue was completed in 1905, and he and his wife Nellie moved into the house; the structure had cost $400,000 to construct. The facade of the Holbrook House was finished by that April, and his house was finished the next year.

==== Occupancy ====
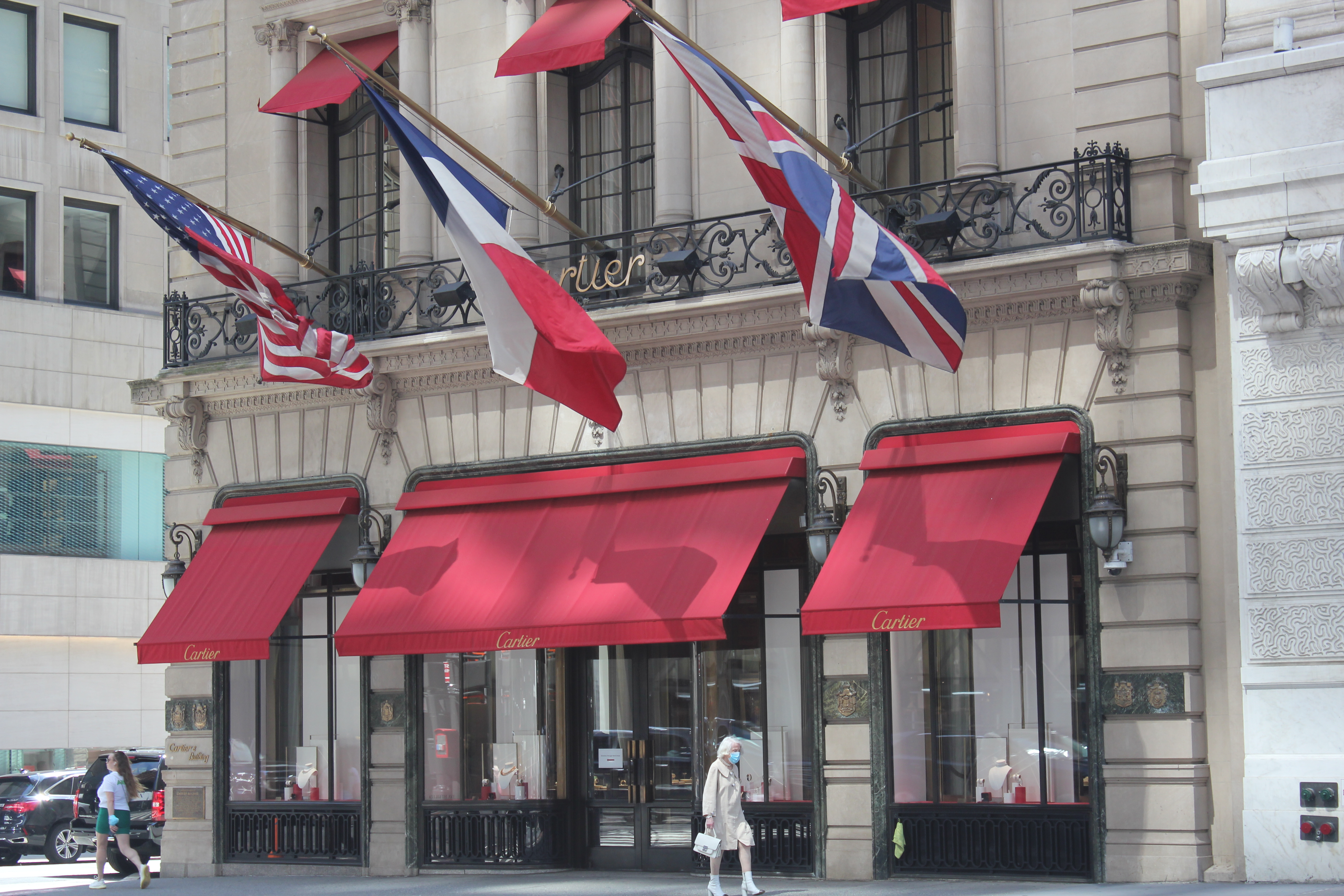
View of the base of 653 Fifth Avenue, later modified to contain a Cartier storefront

When 4 East 52nd Street was completed, it was occupied by Edward Holbrook and his wife Frances. In January 1906, the Holbrook House hosted the wedding of their daughter Lilian to Count Guillaume de Balincourt. The Holbrooks sold the residence a year and a half later, in June 1907. The buyers of the 52nd Street house were initially not publicly revealed, but The New York Times announced the following month that tobacco businessman James Buchanan Duke had bought the house for $300,000. The Times reported that Duke was rumored to have been looking for a mansion on the Upper East Side. Duke had purchased a site on 78th Street by 1909, which would become his house. 4 East 52nd Street was then occupied by the family of real estate developer Harry James Luce, who had moved into the house by August 1910, when he received a mortgage on the property.

Immediately to the west, Fifth Avenue was widened in 1911, and the marble steps in front of Plant's house had to be cut back. Plant was forced to truncate his front areaway and fence. Around that time, the neighborhood was growing increasingly commercial. Plant's wife Nellie died in 1913, and the next year he remarried to Mae Cadwell. By 1916, Plant decided to move to a new mansion at Fifth Avenue and 86th Street. The new mansion was designed by Guy Lowell as an interpretation of an Italian Renaissance palazzo. (Note: The second mansion was occupied by Morton Plant until his death in 1918. Afterward, Mae Plant married Col. William Hayward. She died in 1956 and the house was torn down soon after.) Plant also asked William Kissam Vanderbilt to remove the restriction that limited the old Plant house to residential use. Vanderbilt agreed to lift the restriction and paid Plant $1 million for ownership of 651–653 Fifth Avenue.

The Luces retained their adjacent house for several more years; in 1922, The New York Times published a social bulletin announcing that Harry Luce's daughter was returning to the house after three years abroad. The Luce family continued to live at 4 East 52nd Street until about 1927.

=== Commercial use ===
==== Store conversion ====
William Kissam Vanderbilt took over 653 Fifth Avenue and leased the house to Cartier in October 1916 for $50,000 a year, among the highest rates for a property on Fifth Avenue at the time. Cartier's previous space at 712 Fifth Avenue was becoming too small for the company. When the neighboring house at number 647 was sold to an art dealer the next month, the Real Estate Record and Guide said the sales marked "another step in the transition of this section of Fifth avenue from the residential to the business stage". In July 1917, Louis J. Cartier and Pierre C. Cartier decided to buy the Plant House outright. The trade consisted of $100 in cash and included a double-stranded necklace of 128 flawlessly matched natural pearls valued at the time at $1 million (equivalent to $25,129,900 in 2025 (Note: 1634–1699: McCusker, J. J. (1997). How Much Is That in Real Money? A Historical Price Index for Use as a Deflator of Money Values in the Economy of the United States: Addenda et Corrigenda (PDF). American Antiquarian Society. 1700–1799: McCusker, J. J. (1992). How Much Is That in Real Money? A Historical Price Index for Use as a Deflator of Money Values in the Economy of the United States (PDF). American Antiquarian Society. 1800–present: Federal Reserve Bank of Minneapolis. "Consumer Price Index (estimate) 1800–".)). (Note: A Bloomberg article cites the Real Estate Record and Guide (1917) as saying the ownership was transferred for "$100 and other valuable considerations", with a necklace possibly being included in these "considerations".) Mae Plant had admired this necklace in the window of Cartier's 712 Fifth Avenue shop. Because of the later advent of cultured pearls causing the prices of pearls to plunge, the Cartier necklace was worth only $151,000 (equivalent to $1,776,300 in 2025) after Mae Plant died in 1956.

William Welles Bosworth designed a conversion of the Plant House into a Cartier store. As part of the Plant House's conversion, the original front doorway in the middle of the facade on 52nd Street was removed. The Fifth Avenue Association granted its "gold medal for altered buildings" to Cartier in November 1917 for its alteration of the Plant House. Cartier hired Bosworth again in 1919 to make further alterations to the Plant residence.

==== 1920s to 1950s ====
The Cartier store was shared with Charvet & Fils, a gentlemen's haberdasher, until 1927. The store also hosted events such as a 1927 exhibition of old timepieces. Nicholas C. Partos took a 63-year lease on Luce's house in March 1927 and considered erecting a 12-story commercial structure on the site. Louis F. Mentz bought Luce's house that July, including a $200,000 mortgage on the property. The house was resold shortly afterward to the 653 Fifth Avenue Corporation, which owned the former Plant residence that Cartier occupied. It was likely around this time that the two houses were joined internally. In November 1928, an information bureau for the French government opened at 4 East 52nd Street.

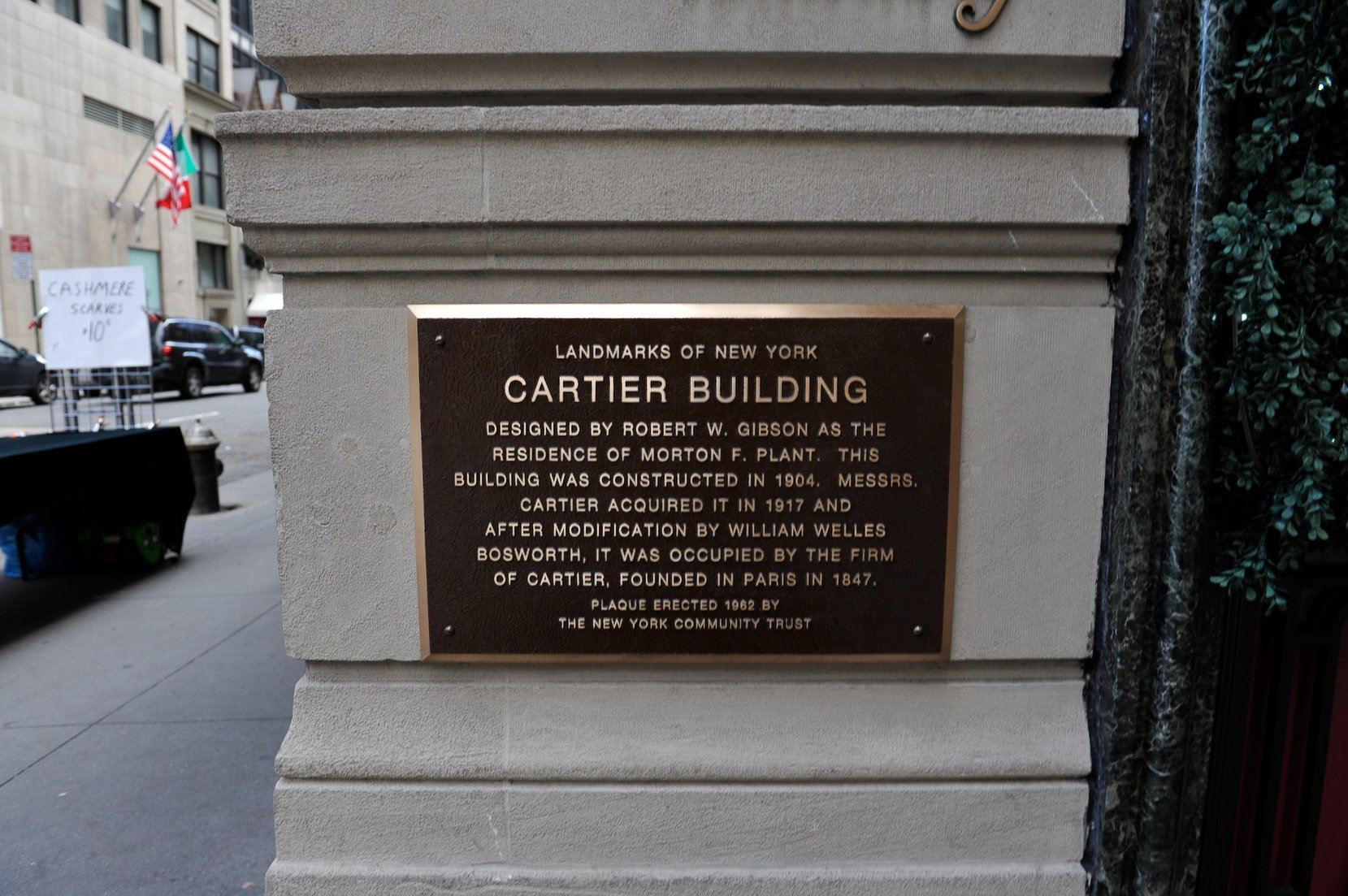
Landmark of New York plaque

4 East 52nd Street came to be occupied by the French Chamber of Commerce and the Alliance Française de New York, which respectively elected Pierre C. Cartier as their president in 1935 and 1938. The French Chamber of Commerce continued to occupy 4 East 52nd Street until at least 1945, when it hosted an exhibit of French craftsmanship. The houses at 653 Fifth Avenue and 4 East 52nd Street, along with the neighboring property at 647 Fifth Avenue, were all acquired in May 1950 by the Phoenix Mutual Life Insurance Company. The buyer, who reportedly paid for the buildings in cash, held the properties as an investment and continued leasing 653 Fifth Avenue to Cartier. In the late 1950s, design firm Design-Technics had a showroom at 4 East 52nd Street, though the firm moved out after 1959, when it leased another building on 53rd Street.

==== 1960s to 1980s ====
The New York City Landmarks Preservation Commission (LPC) designated the Cartier Building as a city landmark on February 5, 1967. Cartier officials threw a party at the Plaza Hotel to celebrate the designation. In designating the building as a landmark, the LPC assumed Cartier owned the building. Phoenix had never even been aware of the landmark status, let alone attended any hearing about it. Once Phoenix learned of the action, it asked the LPC to reconsider the landmark designation, as such a status prohibited major alterations to a building's facade without the LPC's permission. As a result, the landmark status was revoked in August 1967. LPC rules at the time prevented the agency from reconsidering the building as a landmark until 1970. The Cartier Building was re-designated as a city landmark on July 14, 1970.

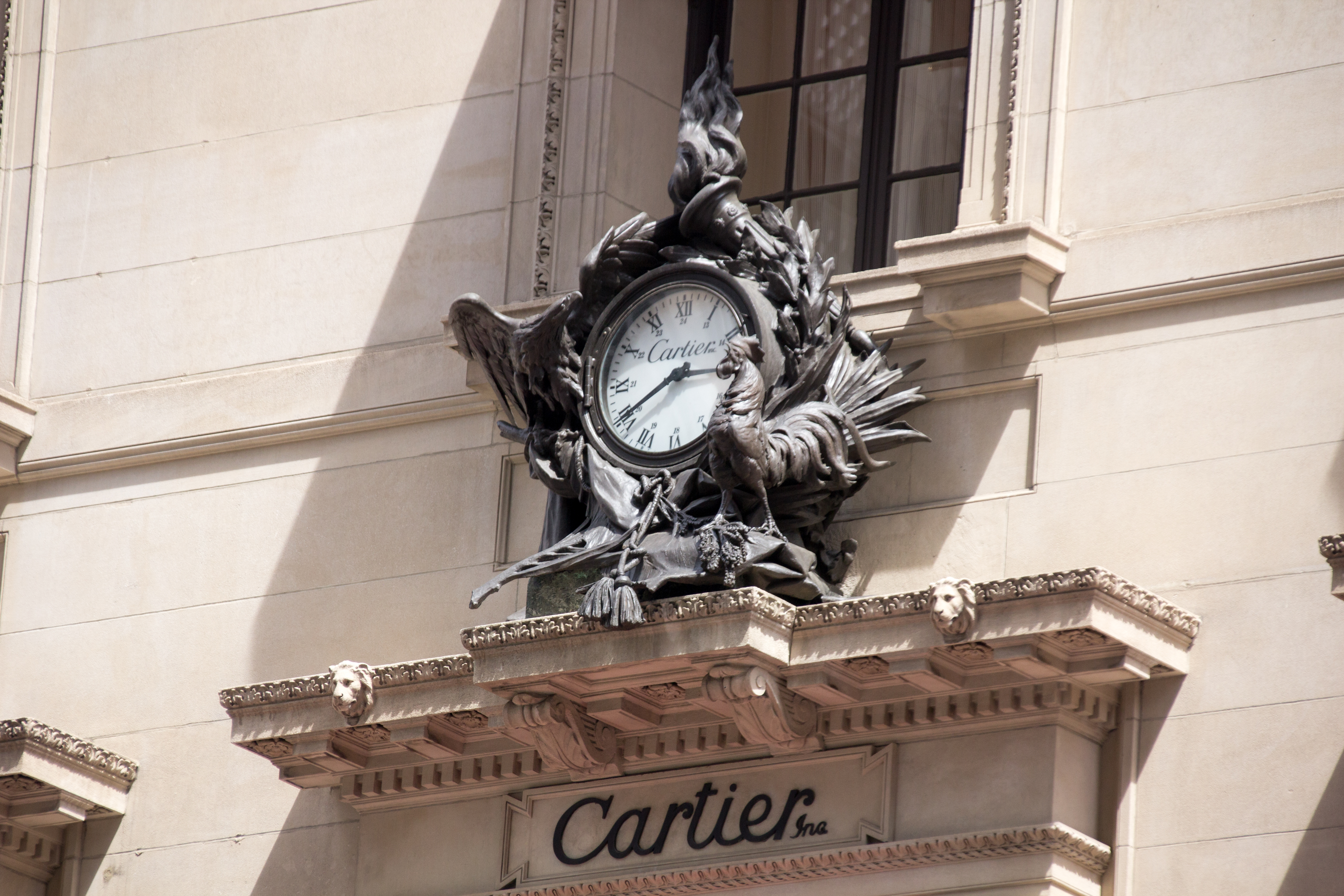
Clock detail

In the late 1960s, Best & Co. purchased the development rights over the Cartier Building. This permitted Best's to erect a skyscraper above their store, which was two buildings south of Cartier's. Aristotle Onassis—the president of Olympic Airways, which at the time had a sales office at 647 Fifth Avenue—established a family trust called Victory Development in March 1970. Victory formed a joint venture with Arlen Realty & Development Corporation to acquire Best's store, 647 Fifth Avenue, and the Cartier Building. The Best & Co. store closed in late 1970 and it was demolished the next year to make way for the Olympic Tower. As part of the Olympic Tower's construction, a pedestrian plaza was built east of 647 Fifth Avenue and the Cartier Building. The tower was ultimately completed and dedicated in 1974.

A Ben Kahn fur salon opened at 4 East 52nd Street in November 1970; at the time, Ben Kahn and Cartier were both owned by the Kenton Corporation. Kenton sold Ben Kahn in 1972, and Cartier opened Les Must de Cartier, a watch boutique, inside 4 East 52nd Street in 1976. Cartier celebrated its 75th anniversary in early 1983 with a gala at the building, to which several LPC officials were invited. On September 8, 1983, the Cartier Building at 651–653 Fifth Avenue and 4 East 52nd Street was added to the National Register of Historic Places (NRHP), along with the adjacent building at 647 Fifth Avenue. The buildings were cited as examples of residences in Midtown Manhattan that were later converted to commercial use. The houses were added to the NRHP as a single listing, the "Houses at 647, 651-53 Fifth Avenue and 4 East 52nd Street". In 1987, Cartier asked the building's owner Olympic Tower Associates for permission to renovate the building's interior. Olympic originally declined, but a New York Supreme Court judge ruled in favor of Cartier in 1989.

==== 1990s to present ====
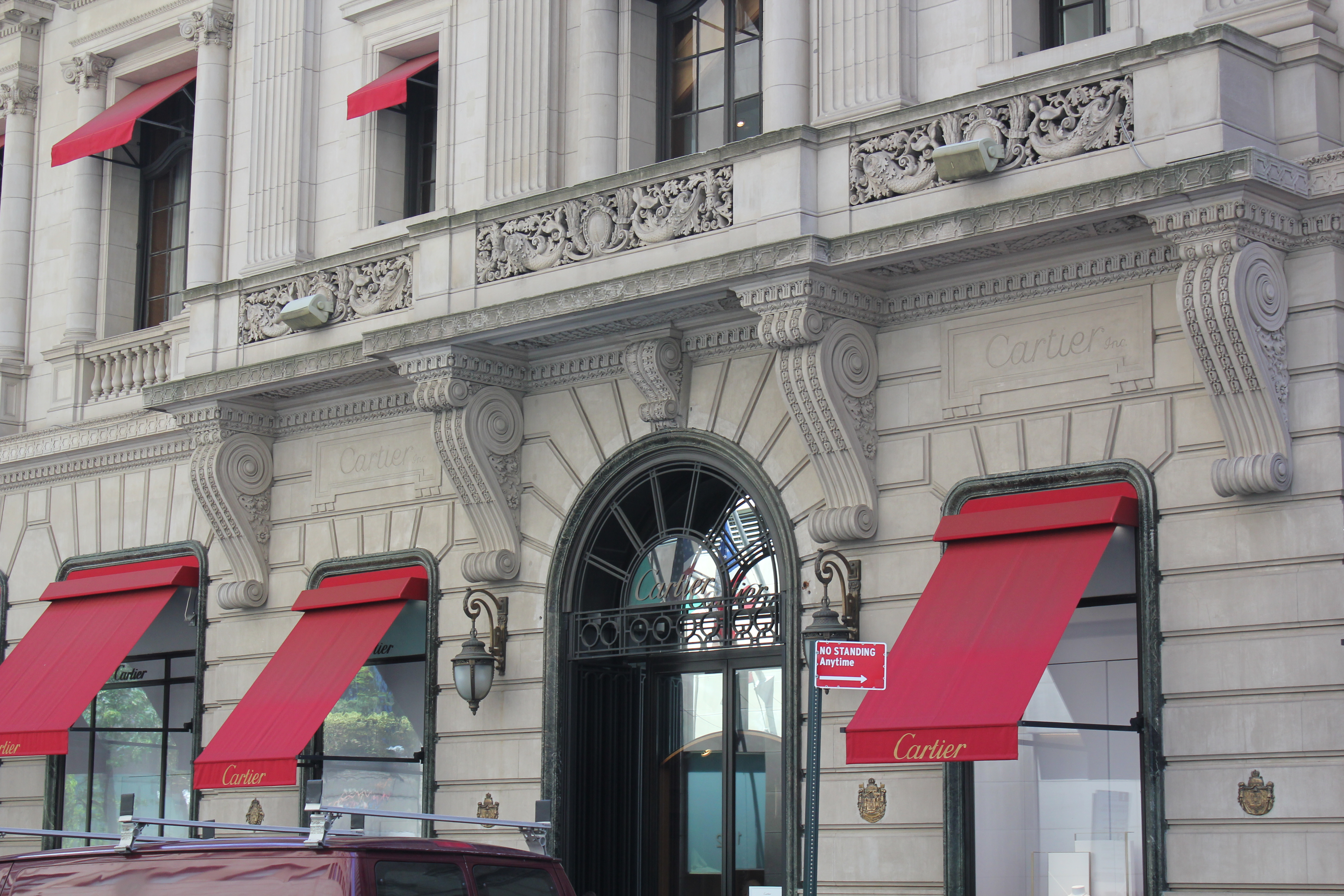
Entrance at 52nd Street, restored in 2001

Butler Rogers Baskett was hired in 1998 to renovate the Cartier Building. Two years later, Cartier announced it would temporarily move to 711 Fifth Avenue while renovations were being conducted. The main entrance on Fifth Avenue was to be relocated from the northernmost bay to the southernmost bay, and a mezzanine over the showroom on Fifth Avenue would be eliminated. In addition, an entrance would be added on 52nd Street, where one of the original entrances had been removed, and window grilles facing Fifth Avenue would be duplicated on the 52nd Street facade. The architects for the renovation were Jean-Michel Wilmotte, Timothy P. Greer, and David Schwartz. Cartier president Alain Viot likened the restoration to "a Cartier product that you redesign as it was before and make it contemporary at the same time". A ribbon-cutting ceremony was hosted in August 2001, marking the building's reopening. The expansion nearly doubled the store's area to 2,077 square feet (193.0 m^{2}).

In May 2012, real estate investment firm Crown Acquisitions took a 49.9 percent stake in the Olympic Tower properties, which included 647 Fifth Avenue, the Cartier Building, the Olympic Tower itself, and a fourth building at 10 East 52nd Street. The Cartier Building received another renovation in 2014, designed by Beyer Blinder Belle in conjunction with Thierry W. Despont. During the renovation, the Cartier store was temporarily at the General Motors Building. The renovation was completed in 2016, two and a half years after it started. Guy Trebay of The New York Times described the 2010s renovation as having turned the Cartier Building into a "thing of rational and distinctly Gallic beauty". A writer quoted in Bloomberg News stated that the new interior was the "single biggest signifier of wealth in Manhattan". The Cartier Building was again renovated in 2022 to designs by Laura Gonzalez.

== See also ==
- 647 Fifth Avenue, adjacent building that is part of the grouping known as "Houses at 647, 651–53 Fifth Avenue and 4 East 52nd Street"
- List of New York City Designated Landmarks in Manhattan from 14th to 59th Streets
- National Register of Historic Places listings in Manhattan from 14th to 59th Streets
