= Louis Cartier =

French businessman, jeweler and heir to the Cartier jewelry house

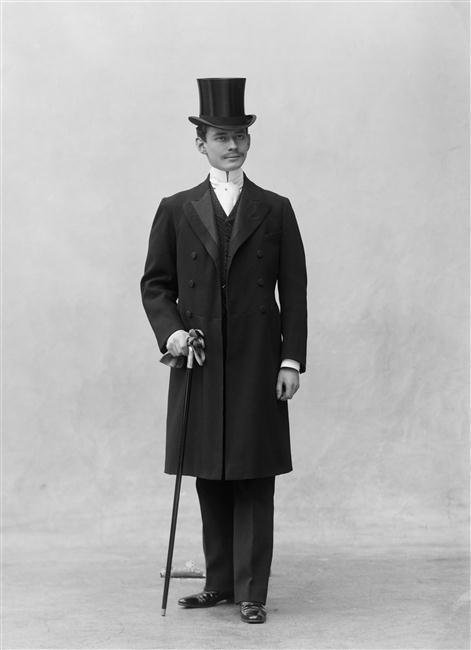
- Cartier around 1898
- Born: Louis Joseph Cartier; June 6, 1875; Paris, France
- Died: July 23, 1942 (aged 67); New York City, U.S.
- Burial place: Cimetière des Gonards
- Occupations: Businessman; jeweler
- Years active: 1898-1942
- Spouses: Andrée Caroline Marie Louise Worth (m. 1898; div. 1909) Jacqueline Almasy (m. 1924)
- Children: 6
- Parents: Alfred Cartier; Amélie Alice Griffeuille

Louis Joseph Cartier (/ˈkɑːrtieɪ/ KAR-tee-ay, French: [lwi ʒozɛf kaʁtje]; June 6, 1875 – July 23, 1942) was a French businessman, jeweler and heir to the Cartier jewelry house. From 1909, he and his brother Pierre were primarily based in New York City. In 1917, they acquired the Cartier Building, formerly owned by Morton Freeman Plant, which became the headquarters of Cartier in North America. He was a resident of San Sebastian, Spain. He was a member of the Cartier family.

== Early life and education ==
Cartier’s collaboration with Charles Jacqueau, who drew on Islamic, Indian, Egyptian, Greek, and Chinese art, further enriched the brand’s style by adding diverse cultural motifs and global artistic influences.

== Death ==
Louis Joseph Cartier died July 23, 1942, aged 67 in Manhattan, New York, U.S.

He was transported back to France and buried on Cimetière des Gonards in Versailles near Paris.

== Literature ==
- Francesca Cartier Brickell; The Cartiers: The Untold Story of the Family Behind de Jewelry Empire; 2019
