= Poems and Songs of Middle Earth =

- 1967 LP sleeve cover, with "triptych" illustration by Pauline Baynes

Studio album by J. R. R. Tolkien and Donald Swann
- Released: 18 October 1967
- Recorded: 12 June 1967 (musical tracks); 15 June 1967 (Tolkien's spoken word tracks)
- Genre: Spoken word; art song
- Length: 35:18
- Label: Caedmon
- Producer: Howard Sackler

Poems and Songs of Middle Earth (Note: [sic], per Hammond & Scull 2006b, p. 823. In the context of Tolkien's work, the place name "Middle-earth" is hyphenated, with only the "M" in uppercase; "Middle Earth", with a space rather than a hyphen and a second uppercase for the "E" in "Earth", is commonplace but incorrect.) is a studio album of spoken-word poetry by the English author J. R. R. Tolkien and art songs composed by the English musician Donald Swann. On the first half of the album, Tolkien recites seven poems from or related to his fantasy novel The Lord of the Rings (1954–55). The second half is a performance of Swann's song cycle The Road Goes Ever On, which sets selections from Tolkien's verse to music. The vocalist William Elvin sings The Road Goes Ever On to Swann's piano accompaniment. Caedmon Records issued the album on 18 October 1967 in the United States, and then on 28 March 1968 in the United Kingdom. Its release coincided with the publication of The Road Goes Ever On as a book of sheet music with commentary and illustration by Tolkien.

Poems and Songs of Middle Earth became the first commercially available audio recording of Tolkien's voice after the success of The Lord of the Rings, as well as the earliest album of music inspired by his fictional Middle-earth. While most of the poetry and lyrics are in English, the album also features Tolkien's constructed languages as recited by the author himself or sung by Elvin under his guidance. Its recordings of two Elvish languages—Quenya and Sindarin—provided early insight into the intended qualities of these languages when spoken aloud. The packaging of the original LP record carried a cover illustration by Pauline Baynes and liner notes written by the poet W. H. Auden. Caedmon reissued the album on cassette tape in 1972 and again in 1977 as part of a box set compilation of Tolkien's audiobooks. The album was out of print by the 21st century.

== Background ==
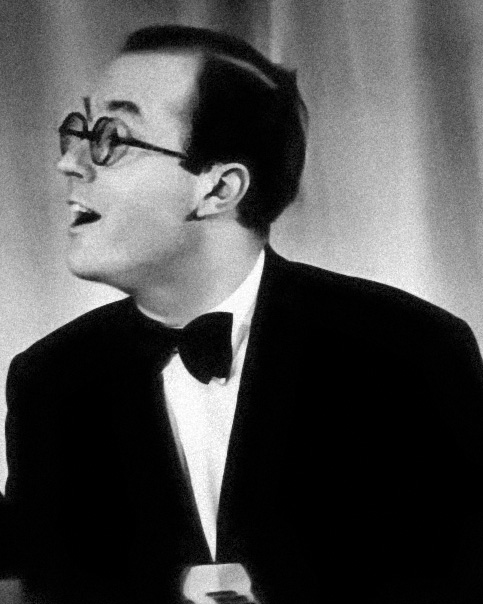
Donald Swann in 1966

In 1965, Donald Swann composed a song cycle titled The Road Goes Ever On, setting various texts by Tolkien to music. Swann requested Tolkien's permission to perform and publish the song cycle, as a derivative work based on Tolkien's copyrighted writings; Tolkien, impressed by Swann's work, approved. The author's British publisher, Allen & Unwin, reached a copyright licensing agreement with Swann in early to mid-January 1966. Allen & Unwin and Tolkien's American publisher Houghton Mifflin made plans to print The Road Goes Ever On as a book of sheet music, with the potential for a recording of the music to be issued simultaneously with the book. Although there was interest in producing a record of the song cycle, an early inquiry to the music publisher and record company Chappell & Co. was rejected. A representative of Chappell indicated that the song cycle would be too short to fill an entire long-playing ("LP") record, and a shorter record was deemed difficult to market in the United States. Shortly thereafter, the Allen & Unwin employee Joy Hill (Note: Margaret Joy Hill (1936–1991) was a longtime secretary at Allen & Unwin. She often worked on Tolkien's behalf, particularly with respect to managing permissions for derivative works adapted from Tolkien's copyrighted fiction, and over the years she befriended the author. Hill was an enthusiastic supporter of Swann's work with Tolkien.) pitched the idea of an LP featuring Swann performing his song cycle on one side and Swann's stage partner, Michael Flanders, reading selections from Tolkien's writings on the other.

Swann met the baritone vocalist William Elvin through Hill's introduction, and the two began collaborating on live performances of Swann's The Road Goes Ever On. Swann felt Elvin's voice befit the material. Moreover, both he and Tolkien were struck by the coincidental aptness of the singer's surname, Elvin. (Note: Cf. the words "elven" and "elfin", as well as the Elves of Tolkien's legendarium. Per The Oxford Dictionary of Family Names in Britain and Ireland, the surname Elvin derives from the Old English Ælfwine, a combination of ælf- ("elf") and -wine ("friend"); Tolkien's posthumous work The Book of Lost Tales (1983–84) features a character named Ælfwine, derived from the same Old English etymology.) Swann called attention to "the unbelievably suitable name", while Tolkien remarked that it was "a good omen". By May 1966, Swann prepared a demo version of his song cycle to send to prospective record companies, and he was also preparing for concert performances and an upcoming radio appearance.

At a meeting that December Tolkien and Swann worked out a finalized structure for the LP, with Tolkien to read his own writings rather than Flanders. Up to that time, Tolkien's voice had only been recorded twice for commercially released records, both times circa April 1930, more than a decade before the publication of The Lord of the Rings. These two records were English lessons with Arthur Lloyd James, released by the London-based company Linguaphone. Tolkien's segments on these educational records were brief, running just over six minutes total. He had also been recorded prior to 1967 on a handful of occasions in other contexts. (Note: These include at least six radio appearances between 1938 and 1965; a recording of a speech given in Rotterdam in 1958; and a few private tape recordings, some at the residence of his friend George Sayer and some at his own home.)

Austin Olney of Houghton Mifflin proposed partnering with Caedmon Records to release the envisioned album. Caedmon, a New York–based record label with offices in London at the time, specialized in spoken word records related to literature. Arriving decades before the mainstream advent of the audiobook, Caedmon "answered the question on many readers' minds", said in the words of historian Matthew Rubery: "What did authors sound like?" Since its founding in 1952, Caedmon had already pressed records by many of the preeminent authors of 20th century literature, among them Albert Camus, T. S. Eliot, William Faulkner, Langston Hughes, James Joyce, Thomas Mann, Sylvia Plath, Gertrude Stein, Wallace Stevens, and W. B. Yeats. Accordingly, the label was closely associated with esteemed literary fiction and the high-minded literary community. Given the hostile literary reception to Tolkien, the fantasy author and critic Lin Carter professed surprise when he discovered that "[e]ven so staid and literary a firm as Caedmon Records offers a disc whereon the good Professor [Tolkien] may be heard reading some of the poems from [The Lord of the Rings] in his own language!"

== Recording ==
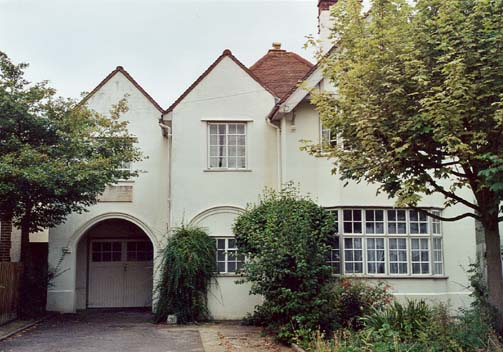
Tolkien recorded his poetry recitals at his home on Sandfield Road, Oxford.

In March 1967, Swann wrote to Tolkien for advice on vocal coaching for Elvin, as both performers strove to maintain faithfulness in the pronunciation of words from Tolkien's constructed languages. Tolkien provided phonetic notes tailored to Swann and Elvin's voices. In April, Rayner Unwin wrote to Tolkien to inform him that arrangements had been made to release the LP through Caedmon, as well as for Tolkien to be recorded at his home by employees of the record label. A representative from Caedmon sent Tolkien a tape recorder to keep and use for practice in May, and the author conveyed in a letter to Unwin that he had been practicing recording himself.

According to a discography at the Donald Swann Website, (Note: The Donald Swann Website is a memorial site devoted to Swann's music, launched by his wife Alison Swann. Its informational contents were supplied by Swann's archivist, Leon Berger.) Swann and Elvin recorded the songs from The Road Goes Ever On on 12 June 1967. Tolkien recorded his spoken readings on 15 June 1967. Caedmon sent the producer Howard Sackler and an engineer with equipment to record at Tolkien's home on Sandfield Road in Oxford. Recording took place after 4 p.m.—later than Tolkien preferred. An earlier arrival by Caedmon's team was not possible, as their schedule required them to travel that day from London, but a Caedmon representative assured Tolkien that the process of recording at home would be unobtrusive. Afterwards, Tolkien reported to Swann that he enjoyed the recording session, and commended the "helpful and appreciative" disposition of the recording team. While recording his poem "The Sea-Bell", Tolkien spotted an error in the published text that had gone unnoticed before.

== Contents ==
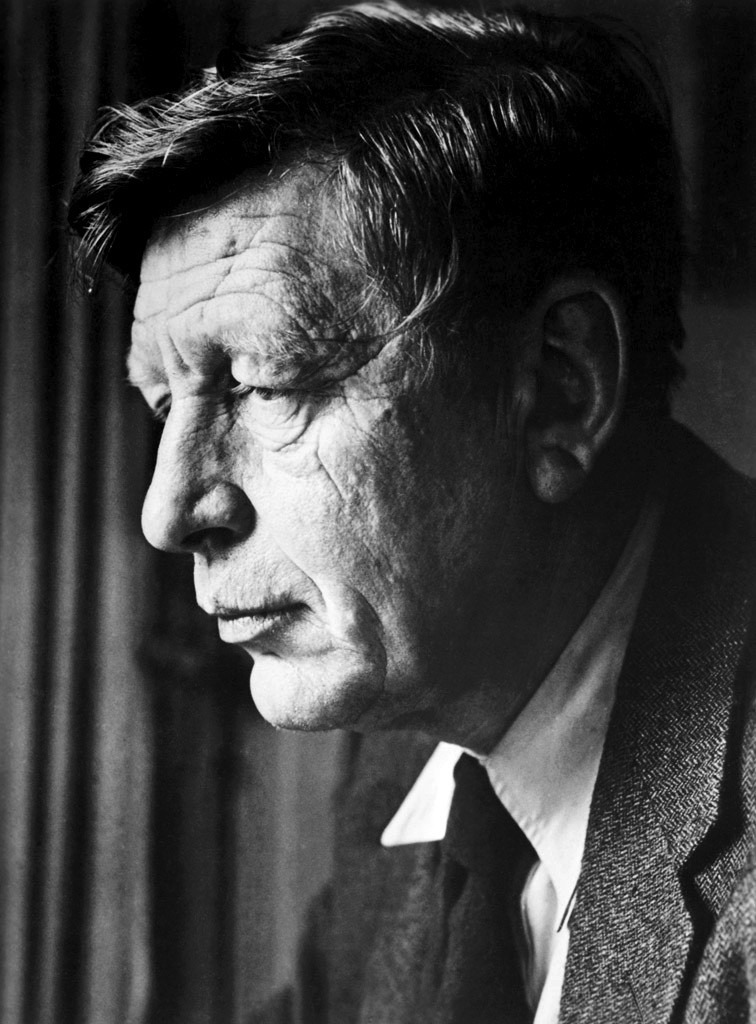
The poet W. H. Auden wrote the LP's liner notes.

The first side of the LP contains spoken-word recitals by Tolkien. He read six poems taken from his collection The Adventures of Tom Bombadil (1962) and his fantasy novel The Lord of the Rings (1954–55). The second half contains about 20 seconds of additional reading by Tolkien, followed by Swann's song-cycle The Road Goes Ever On, which sets seven of Tolkien's poems to music with vocals by Elvin and piano accompaniment played by Swann himself. (Note: Swann and Elvin recorded the seven songs found on the first edition of The Road Goes Ever On. Swann later wrote two new songs, "Bilbo's Last Song" and "Lúthien Tinúviel", for inclusion in subsequent editions.) Tolkien contributed the melody for one of the songs, "Namárië", in a style evocative of Gregorian chant. Swann's compositions are influenced by English folk music, complementing the traditional style of Tolkien's verse. A critic for the English Journal compared most of the compositions to lieder, while noting a resemblance between "Errantry" and the patter songs of Gilbert and Sullivan.

=== Packaging and liner notes ===
The illustration on the LP sleeve's cover—a "triptych" view of a Middle-earth landscape designed by Pauline Baynes—had previously appeared on the slipcase of the deluxe three-volume edition of The Lord of the Rings published by Allen & Unwin in 1964 (but printed in 1963). Describing the album cover, Valerie Anand identifies Orodruin, or Mount Doom, "in the far distance and a dramatic castle as a landmark in the middle distance, leading the eye onwards, as it were."

The poet W. H. Auden contributed introductory liner notes for the LP sleeve's reverse side. Auden agreed to do so in August 1967, pleasing Tolkien immensely. The two writers had expressed their mutual admiration in correspondence early that year, spurred by the publication of Tolkien's poem "For W. H. A." in a special issue of the literary magazine Shenandoah dedicated to Auden in honor of his 60th birthday. Auden thanked Tolkien for the poem and expressed his further admiration of "The Sea-Bell", one of the poems Tolkien had recorded for the album. In his essay, Auden lauds Tolkien's verse, calling the poems' metres "as exciting as they are various", and claims the author's fantasy works

will either totally enthrall you or leave you stone cold, and, whichever your response, nothing and nobody will ever change it. As a member of the enchanted party, I have found by experience that it is quite useless to argue with the unconverted.

Enthusiastic though Auden was for the recordings of Elvish poetry, his essay expresses disappointment that the album lacked readings from the poetry of Rohan, a kingdom of Men in The Lord of the Rings.

== Release history ==
Release history for Poems and Songs of Middle Earth
Release date	Description	Region	Format	Label	Cat. no.	Ref.
18 October 1967	First pressing.	US	Vinyl LP	Caedmon Records	TC 1231 (TC 91231)	
28 March 1968	First UK pressing.	UK	Vinyl LP	Caedmon Records	TC 1231 (TC 91231)	
September 1971	Reissue through English retailer Record Specialities and Henry Stave, Ltd.; identical to the first pressings.	UK	Vinyl LP	Caedmon Records	TC 1231 (TC 91231)	
1972	First pressing on cassette.	US/UK	Cassette tape	Caedmon Records	CDL 51231	
1977	Reissue – The J. R. R. Tolkien Soundbook versions. Either sold individually, or as part of the complete Soundbook box sets (4×LP: SBR 101 / 4×CS: SBC 101).	US/UK	Vinyl LP	Caedmon Records	TC 1231	
1977	Reissue – The J. R. R. Tolkien Soundbook versions. Either sold individually, or as part of the complete Soundbook box sets (4×LP: SBR 101 / 4×CS: SBC 101).	US/UK	Cassette tape	Caedmon Records	CDL 51231	

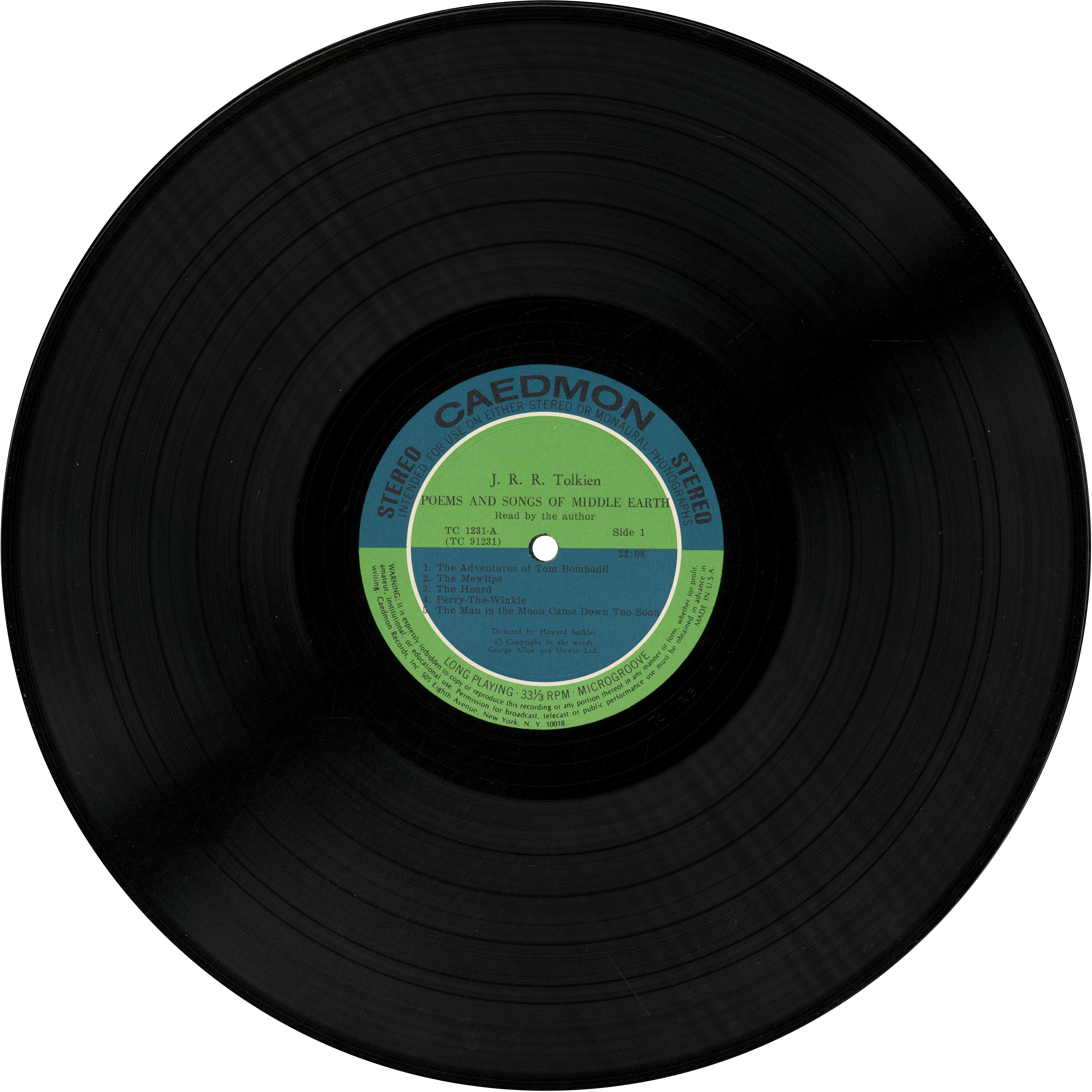
1967 LP, side A
(TC 1231-A)
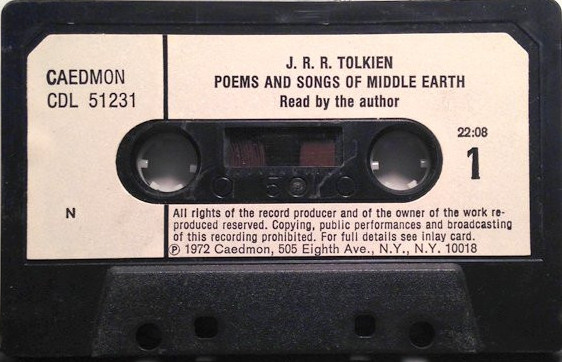
1972 cassette, side 1
(CDL 51231)

Caedmon Records first released Poems and Songs of Middle Earth on 18 October 1967 as a vinyl LP. The first press, limited to the United States, preceded the 31 October publication of The Road Goes Ever On in that country. The original list price was $5.95 (equivalent to $57 in 2025, adjusting for inflation). Ahead of the album's appearance in the British market, Caedmon shipped Tolkien three copies of the record from New York. The LP was released in the UK on 28 March 1968. The track listing on the LP packaging erroneously omits the sixth track on side A, "The Sea-Bell", even though that track is present on the record itself. (Note: The error was discovered by the Tolkien scholars Wayne G. Hammond and Christina Scull while making corrections to their 2006 book The J. R. R. Tolkien Companion and Guide, Vol. II (see Hammond & Scull 2006b), in which they had mistakenly indicated the first edition of the album excluded "The Sea-Bell", having relied on the inaccurate track listing on the record sleeve.)

In late 1971 the retailer Record Specialities (Note: Record Specialities and Henry Stave, Ltd. was an English record shop company. As of October 1971 it sold records through its two brick and mortar shops in London and by international mail order.) reissued the LP, keeping the original Caedmon catalog number. The reissued LP came as part of the first batch of the retailer's new "Caedmon series", in which it would re-release several albums from the label's back catalog each month at a discounted price of £1.99 (equivalent to £25 in 2025). The following year, Caedmon issued the album on cassette tape for the first time. As late as 1985, Caedmon continued to sell tapes of the album, which it marketed alongside audiobooks of works by Tolkien and other authors of fantasy fiction. Poems and Songs of Middle Earth was out of print by the year 2000, but copies remained in circulation via public libraries.

In 1977 Caedmon reissued Poems and Songs of Middle Earth as part of a box set compilation on LP and cassette formats, called The J. R. R. Tolkien Soundbook. It was part of Caedmon's primarily cassette-based "Soundbook" series featured readings of works by famous authors, with readings in the author's own voice whenever possible. The Tolkien Soundbook was one of the first five releases in the series, alongside other entries based on works by Joyce, Thomas, Ogden Nash and Edgar Allan Poe. Also included within the Tolkien Soundbook were Tolkien's readings of The Hobbit and The Lord of the Rings, and Christopher Tolkien's readings from The Silmarillion. Tolkien's recitals from The Adventures of Tom Bombadil reportedly has noticeably higher fidelity on the Soundbook box set than they did on the original 1967 LP.

Caedmon put Tolkien's recitals from Poems and Songs of Middle Earth on the J. R. R. Tolkien Audio Collection, but left out Swann's music. The Audio Collection was issued on tape in 1992 and on CD in 2001.

== Reception ==
Following publication of the sheet music and Swann's early concert performances, The Road Goes Ever On divided opinion among professional critics and Tolkien fans alike. Reception to the musical portions of Poems and Songs of Middle Earth was similarly mixed, while critical consensus was more united with praise for Tolkien's readings. Frederick Woods, a reviewer for classical music magazine The Gramophone, professed great admiration for Tolkien's fiction and readings but ambivalence as to the quality of Swann's compositions. Edmund Fuller's review of the album for The Wall Street Journal was more favourable, citing Elvin's singing as "excellent". Fuller reported "[a]lready, in England, the cycle [The Road Goes Ever On] has established itself in the concert repertory" and predicted "it is likely to become an accepted recital unit in more than one range of voice." As for Tolkien's readings, Fuller said the author deployed a "gruffly no-nonsense voice that is just right".

Several reviews of the record appeared in journals about literature and education. In The Horn Book Magazine, Ethel L. Hynes wrote that Elvin's vocals "reveal[ed] [the songs'] beautiful melodic line and the lyric romanticism that matches the mood of the texts." Peter Gellatly of Library Journal called Tolkien's readings "notable for their jewelled ornateness and for the zestful, old-country voice in which they are read" and Swann's music "slightly reminiscent of the old-fashioned art-song, [though] there is no denying it is strictly up to date". John R. Searles at the English Journal generally praised the compositions, especially "Namárië", which he said would may tend to strike many listeners as "the most appropriate and moving melody" on the collection. Searles wrote that Elvin "sings the songs beautifully", but characterised Tolkien's reading voice as "husky, sometimes growling, and not always distinct." Catheryne S. Franklin—a professor of library science at the University of Texas at Austin, reviewing the album for audiovisual education journal Film News—judged Tolkien's accented pronunciation sufficiently intelligible for a general American audience: "Though British speech patterns are often difficult to understand, especially if words are 'bitten off' (which is the main criticism of Basil Rathbone's readings), Mr. Tolkien's pleasant voice and delivery are less 'clipped' and 'British' than might be expected." Overall, Franklin had a mixed impression of the record and Swann's music, though she conceded it may appeal to those already interested in Tolkien's literary works: "High school English teachers who belong to or recognize the cult," Franklin suggested, "might try this record with students, as an example of poetry with rhyming and metrical tricks."

In the years following its release, educators and academics cited the album's value as pedagogical tool for teaching children and a resource for enhanced understanding of Tolkien's poetics. In a 1970 article for High Fidelity titled "What Records Should You Give to Children?", Eleanor Kulleseid, a librarian for Bank Street College of Education in New York City, recommended the album "for Hobbit-lovers and those who wish to brush up on their Elvish." Bibliographer Marshall Tymn listed it as a resource for teaching science fiction and fantasy in The Science Fiction Reference Book (1981). The album was further endorsed for its usefulness as a multimedia teaching aid by educator Don Adrian Davidson (in 1972), elementary school library specialist Mary Ann Paulin (in 1982), and children's author and librarian Sarah Ellis (in 2000). In poet Paul Edwin Zimmer's view, the album's recordings of Tolkien reading his own verse clarify the task of analysing and applying scansion to the author's poetry, full as it is of complex "metrical tricks", evident in for example "The Adventures of Tom Bombadil".

Responses to the album have informed the overall reception to The Road Goes Ever On as a musical piece, especially given its status as the only commercially released recording of the songs. "Swann's song cycle", said the Tolkien scholar David Bratman, "has never gotten quite the attention it deserves, partly because its one recording is in a reserved, fastidious style." Swann continued to stage performances of The Road Goes Ever On from time to time throughout the remainder of his career, and Tolkien scholars have evaluated his later performances by comparison to the 1967 recording as a benchmark. Bratman preferred Swann's later live performances for their livelier mood and more sophisticated arrangements. At least one other recording of a performance by Swann exists: a 1993 live performance, privately distributed on cassette as a bootleg, featuring Swann on lead vocals supported by a choir. (Note: The performance occurred on May 5, 1993, at the Bunyan Meeting Free Church in Bedford, England.) William Phemister found the 1993 recording "generally faster and freer" than the 1967 album, though he said "comparison of the two recordings shows that any of these tempi work well."

== Track listing ==
All lyrics are written by J. R. R. Tolkien; all music is composed by Donald Swann, except "Namárië", for which Tolkien proposed a melody to Swann.

Side A
No.	Title	Textual source	Length
1.	"The Adventures of Tom Bombadil"	The Adventures of Tom Bombadil, Song 1	4:00
2.	"The Mewlips"	The Adventures of Tom Bombadil, Song 9	1:21
3.	"The Hoard"	The Adventures of Tom Bombadil, Song 14	3:25
4.	"Perry-the-Winkle"	The Adventures of Tom Bombadil, Song 8	4:26
5.	"The Man in the Moon Came Down Too Soon"	The Adventures of Tom Bombadil, Song 6	5:16
6.	"The Sea-Bell"	The Adventures of Tom Bombadil, Song 15	5:25

Side B
No.	Title	Source	Length
1.	"A Elbereth Gilthoniel" (in Sindarin)	The Fellowship of the Ring, Book II, ch. 1: "Many Meetings"	0:14
2.	"The Road Goes Ever On"	The Fellowship of the Ring, Book I, ch. 1: "A Long-expected Party"	1:00
3.	"Upon the Hearth the Fire Is Red"	The Fellowship of the Ring, Book I, ch. 3: "Three Is Company"	1:35
4.	"In the Willow-Meads of Tasarinan"	The Two Towers, Book III, ch. 4: "Treebeard"	2:35
5.	"In Western Lands"	The Return of the King, Book VI, ch. 1: "The Tower of Cirith Ungol"	2:15
6.	"Namárië" (in Quenya)	The Fellowship of the Ring, Book II, ch. 8: "Farewell to Lórien"	1:25
7.	"I Sit Beside the Fire / Refrain: A Elbereth Gilthoniel" ("Refrain" in Sindarin)	The Fellowship of the Ring, Book II, ch. 3: "The Ring Goes South" and ch. 8: "Farewell to Lórien" / Book II, ch. 1: "Many Meetings"	3:38
8.	"Errantry"	The Adventures of Tom Bombadil, Song 3	3:43
Total length:			35:18

== Personnel ==
Credits adapted from the 1967 LP record sleeve (Caedmon Records, TC 1231).

- J. R. R. Tolkien – spoken word
- Donald Swann – piano
- William Elvin – vocals
- Howard Sackler – production

=== 1967 LP packaging ===
- Pauline Baynes – sleeve illustration
- Bryan Wittman – sleeve design
- W. H. Auden – liner notes

== Sources ==
- Anand, Valerie (September 2001). "The Tolkien Effect". Tolkien—why is he important today?. Mallorn (39). The Tolkien Society: 38–39. JSTOR 45320599.
- Ashford, Richard (April 1979). "J. R. R. Tolkien – J. R. R. Tolkien Soundbook". Audio-Visual Reviews. The Horn Book Magazine. LV (2). Boston: The Horn Book, Inc.: 212–213 – via the Internet Archive.
- Berger, Leon; Cochrane, Ilke (2013). "Donald Swann – LPs". The Donald Swann Website. Archived from the original on 9 October 2021.
- Bramlett, Perry C. (2003). I Am in Fact a Hobbit: An Introduction to the Life and Works of J. R. R. Tolkien. Macon, Georgia: Mercer University Press. ISBN 0-86554-894-3 – via Google Books.
- Bratman, David (2010). "Liquid Tolkien: Music, Tolkien, Middle-earth, and More Music". In Eden, Bradford Lee (ed.). Middle-earth Minstrel: Essays on Music in Tolkien. Jefferson, North Carolina: McFarland & Company. pp. 140–170. ISBN 978-0-7864-4814-2.
- Carter, Lin (1969). Tolkien: A Look Behind The Lord of the Rings. New York: Ballantine Books. OCLC 1036893929 – via the Internet Archive.
- Davidson, Don Adrian (January 1972). "Sword and Sorcery Fiction: An Annotated Book List". The English Journal. 61 (1): 43–51. doi:10.2307/812893. JSTOR 812893.
- Ellis, Sarah (2000). From Reader to Writer: Teaching Writing Through Classic Children's Books. Toronto: Groundwood Books. ISBN 0-88899-372-2 – via the Internet Archive.
- Franklin, Catheryne S. (June 1968). "Poems and Songs of Middle Earth—#TC 1231; one 12-inch 33-1/3 rpm record. Produced and for sale by Caedmon Records (FN), 505 Eighth Ave., New York 10018". Record Reviews. Film News: The Newsmagazine of Film, Filmstrips, Records, Educational TV. Vol. 25, no. 3. New York: FN/International, Inc. p. 32. ISSN 8750-068X – via the Internet Archive.
- Fuller, Edmund (29 December 1967). "Land of Nourishment". The Bookshelf. The Wall Street Journal. Vol. CLXX, no. 126. New York: Dow Jones & Company. p. 6. ProQuest 133184047.
- Gellatly, Peter (1 February 1968). "Tolkien. The Road Goes On [sic]—Poems and Songs of Middle Earth. Read by J. R. R. Tolkien. Sung by William Elvin. Caedmon TC-1231 and TC-91231 (stereo). $5.95". On the Record. Library Journal. 93 (3). New York: R. R. Bowker: 530 – via the Internet Archive.
- The Gramophone staff (October 1971). "Caedmon Reissues". The Gramophone. Vol. XLIX, no. 581. Middlesex & London. p. 701 – via Exact Editions.
- Hammond, Wayne G.; Anderson, Douglas A. (1993). J. R. R. Tolkien: A Descriptive Bibliography (1st ed.). Winchester and Delaware: St. Paul's Bibliographies and Oak Knoll Press. ISBN 1-873040-11-3 – via the Internet Archive.
- Hammond, Wayne G.; Scull, Christina (2006a). [[The J. R. R. Tolkien Companion and Guide]]. Vol. I: Chronology. New York: HarperCollins. ISBN 978-0-618-39102-8.
- Hammond, Wayne G.; Scull, Christina (2006b). [[The J. R. R. Tolkien Companion and Guide]]. Vol. II: Reader's Guide. New York: HarperCollins. ISBN 978-0-618-39101-1.
- Hammond, Wayne G.; Scull, Christina (31 March 2015). "Addenda and Corrigenda to The J. R. R. Tolkien Companion and Guide (2006) Vol. 2: Reader's Guide · Arranged by Date". HammondandScull.com. Archived from the original on 7 May 2021.
- Hanks, Patrick; Coates, Richard; McClure, Peter (2016). "Elvin". The Oxford Dictionary of Family Names in Britain and Ireland. Oxford University Press. ISBN 978-0-19-178179-7.
- Hynes, Ethel L. (April 1968). "J. R. R. Tolkien – The Road Goes Ever On: A Song Cycle / J. R. R. Tolkien – Poems and Songs of Middle Earth". Audio-Visual Reviews. The Horn Book Magazine. XLIV (2). Boston: The Horn Book, Inc.: 188–189 – via the Internet Archive.
- Keleny, Guy (6 November 2010). "Errors & Omissions: We can't escape 'The Hobbit', but we can at least get the details right". The Independent. London. Gale A241389742.
- Khuri, Grace (19 April 2021). "What Is the 'Silmarillion'?". Fantasy Literature (Podcast). University of Oxford Podcasts.
- Kulleseid, Eleanor (December 1970). "What Records Should You Give to Children?" (PDF). High Fidelity. Vol. 20, no. 12. Great Barrington, Massachusetts: Billboard Publications, Inc. pp. 79–83. Archived (PDF) from the original on 9 March 2021 – via worldradiohistory.com.
- Neubauer, Łukasz (2018–2019). "'Testing the Whole Thing on Tape': A Preliminary Insight into the Performative Dimensions of J. R. R. Tolkien's Own Recording of 'The Homecoming of Beorhtnoth Beorhthelm's Son'". Quaestiones Oralitatis. IV. Wrocław, Poland: Centre for the Study of Oral Culture at the University of Wrocław. doi:10.34616/QO.2019.4.211.235. ISSN 2449-8181.
- Paulin, Mary Ann (1982). Creative Uses of Children's Literature. Hamden, Connecticut: Library Professional Publication. ISBN 0-208-01861-1 – via the Internet Archive.
- Phemister, William (1996). "Fantasy Set to Music: Donald Swann, C. S. Lewis and J. R. R. Tolkien". VII: Journal of the Marion E. Wade Center. 13. Wheaton, Illinois: Marion E. Wade Center: 64–82. JSTOR 45296547.
- Porter, Andrew I., ed. (September 1985). "Science Fiction, Fantasy Now on Audiotape". Science Fiction Chronicle. Vol. 6, no. 12. New York: F&SF Book Co., Inc. pp. 4, 6. ISSN 0195-5365 – via the Internet Archive.
- Postgate, Mary (November 1980). "Spoken Word". Cassette Feature. Gramophone. Vol. 58, no. 690. Middlesex & London. pp. 630, 635 – via Exact Editions.
- Record Specialities and Henry Stave, Ltd. (October 1971). "Service, Guidance, Choice: Record Specialities and Henry Stave [advertisement]". The Gramophone. Vol. XLIX, no. 581. Middlesex & London. p. 621 – via Exact Editions.
- Record Specialities and Henry Stave, Ltd.; Caedmon Records (September 1971). "Record Specialities and Henry Stave Re-Introduce Caedmon [advertisement]". The Gramophone. Vol. XLIX, no. 580. Middlesex & London. p. 455 – via Exact Editions.
- Rubery, Matthew (2016). The Untold Story of the Talking Book. Cambridge, Massachusetts: Harvard University Press. ISBN 978-0-674-54544-1 – via the Internet Archive.
- Ruud, Jay (2011). Critical Companion to J. R. R. Tolkien: A Literary Reference to His Life and Work. New York: Infobase Learning. ISBN 978-1-4381-3684-4.
- Searles, John R. (March 1968). "Recordings from Caedmon. The Comedy of Errors. King Richard III. Idylls of the King. Poems and Songs of Middle Earth. The Last of the Mohicans". The English Journal. 57 (3). Honolulu: National Council of Teachers of English: 437–439. doi:10.2307/812256. JSTOR 812256.
- Thompson, George H. (Autumn 1986). "Early Review of Books by J. R. R. Tolkien". Mythlore. 13 (1). East Lansing, Michigan: Mythopoeic Society: 54–59. JSTOR 26812921.
- Tymn, Marshall B. (1981). "Resources for Teaching Science Fiction". In Tymn, Marshall B. (ed.). The Science Fiction Reference Book. Mercer Island, Washington: Starmont House. pp. 453–479. ISBN 0-916732-24-X – via the Internet Archive (registration required).
- Woods, Frederick (May 1968). "Tolkien. Poems and Songs of Middle Earth. J. R. R. Tolkien (reader, a), William Elvin (baritone, b), Donald Swann (piano, b). Caedmon Ⓜ TC1231 (12 in., 42s. 8d)". The Gramophone. Vol. XLV, no. 540. Middlesex & London. p. 607 – via Exact Editions.
- Zimmer, Paul Edwin (Spring 1993). "Another Opinion of 'The Verse of J. R. R. Tolkien'". Mythlore. 19 (2). East Lansing, Michigan: Mythopoeic Society: 16–23. JSTOR 26812735.
