= Konstantinos Staikos =

Greek architect and book historian (1943–2023)

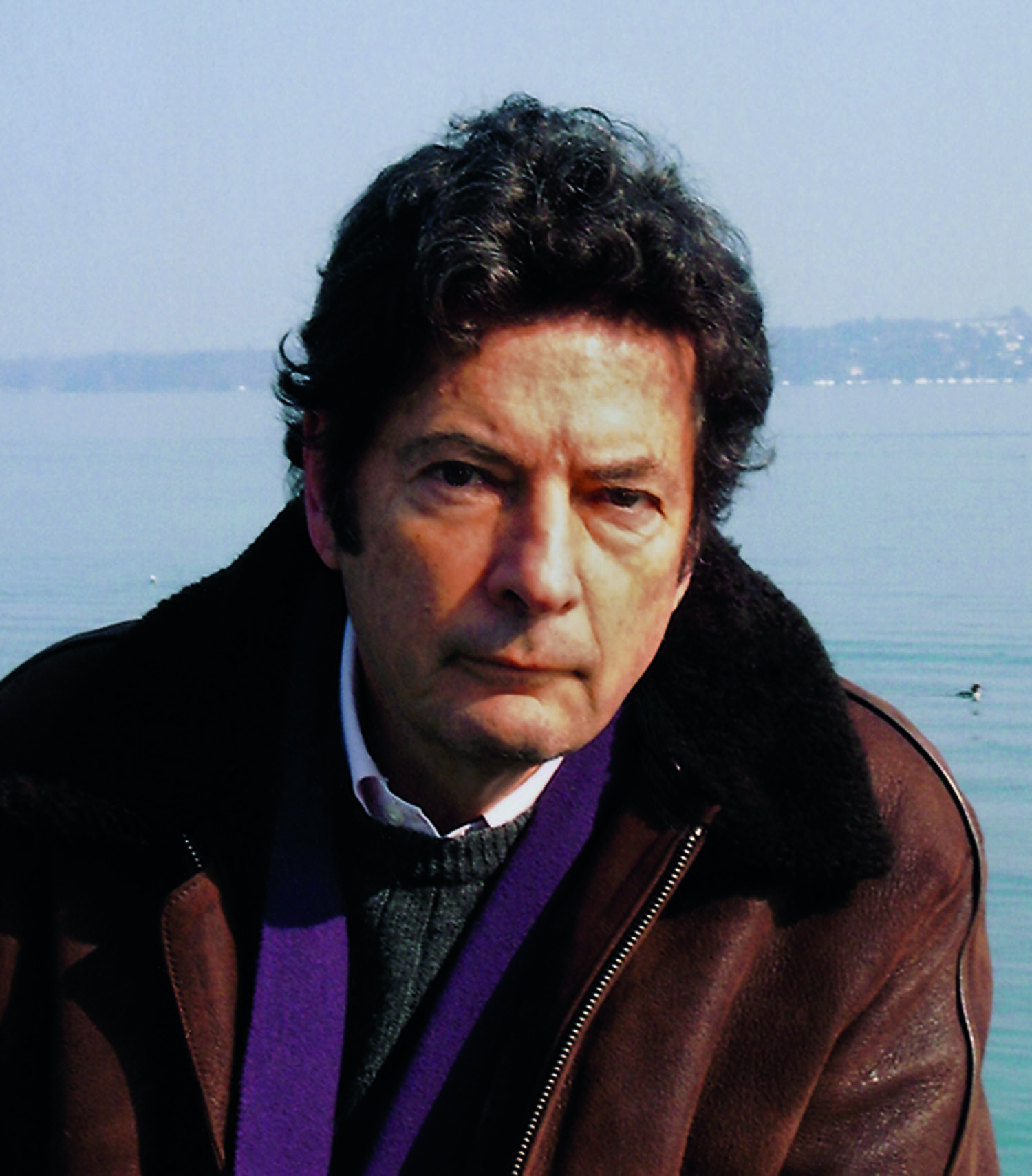
Konstantinos Staikos

Konstantinos Staikos (Greek: Κωνσταντίνος Στάικος; 1943 – 3 April 2023) was a Greek architect and book historian. He was born in Athens. He studied interior architecture and design in Paris, and practiced in that field since the 1960s.

In the early 1970s Staikos took a serious interest in the history of Greek books during the period of the Greek diaspora (from the Fall of Constantinople in 1453 to about 1830). In his professional capacity he was commissioned to redesign and reorganize two historic libraries of the Christian world: those of the Monastery of St John on Patmos (founded in 1089), completed in 1989, and of the Ecumenical Patriarchate in the Phanar, Constantinople (dating from 353, soon after the city's official inauguration as the capital of the Eastern Roman Empire), completed in 1993.

Towards the end of the 1980s Staikos embarked on a systematic study of the history of libraries in the countries of the Mediterranean Basin and the Near East, from earliest antiquity to the Renaissance (about 3000 BC to AD 1600). This took him to the most important monastic and secular libraries in Europe, to gather material about their founders and their history, to discover what could be learnt from ancient Greek and Latin and other early sources about the methods of book distribution, the book trade and book-collecting – from the papyrus roll to the codex and the printed book –, as well as the evolution of library architecture over those four and a half millennia.

Among his publications are The Great Libraries (2000), the five volume History of the Library in Western Civilization, Oak Knoll Press (2001-2013) and the Books and Ideas. The Library of Plato and of the Academy, Oak Knoll Press (2013). McNally has noted that "The Byzantine Empire role in book and library history deserves study for two reasons: first, it is of great importance to the Western cultural tradition, and second it serves as an important case study in its own right." "Libraries were, Staikos reminds us, enmeshed in and thoroughly integrated into Roman life—at least at the top—in ways impossible in later ages.

The Konstantinos Staikos' book collection was acquired by the Onassis Foundation in 2010 as perpetual property of the Greek Nation. The Konstantinos Staikos' book collection was renamed "Hellenic Library of the Onassis Foundation" and is housed in the neoclassical building at 56 Amalias Avenue Plaka, Athens, Greece.

Staikos died in Athens on 3 April 2023, at the age of 80.

== Works ==
- The Great Libraries: From the Antiquities to the Renaissance, New Castle, Del.: Oak Knoll Press, 2000.
- The History of the Library in Western Civilization, translated by Timothy Cullen, New Castle, Del.: Oak Knoll Press, 2004-2013 (six volumes: 1. From Minos to Cleopatra; 2. From Cicero to Hadrian; 3. From Constantine the Great to cardinal Bessarion; 4. From Cassiodorus to Furnival: classical and Christian letters, schools and libraries in the monasteries and universities, Western book centres; 5. From Petrarch to Michelangelo: the revival of the study of the classics and the first humanistic libraries printing in the service of the world of books and monumental libraries; 6. Epilogue and General Index).
- Books and Ideas: The Library of Plato and the Academy, New Castle, Del.: Oak Knoll Press, 2013.
- Testimonies of Platonic Tradition. From the 4th BCE to the 16th Century, New Castle, Del.: Oak Knoll Press, 2015.
- Mouseion and the Library of the Ptolemies in Alexandria: Alexander the Great's Vision of a Universal Intellectual Centre, New Castle, Del.: Oak Knoll Press, 2021.
