= The Konstantinos Staikos' book collection =

The book collection of Konstantinos Staikos is now part of the Alexander S. Onassis Public Benefit Foundation Library It is centered on the intellectual, printing and publishing activity of the Greeks from the Fall of Constantinople in 1453 to the late 19th century. The aim of its creation was to collect and present relevant material from that time period.

== The formation of the collection ==
The genesis of the book collection dates from the 1970s. The bibliophilic interests of Konstantinos Staikos changed radically. In those years also, the Hellenic Bibliophile Society was established under the Honorary Presidency of Constantinos Tsatsos.

== History ==
The exhibitions of books of the Society (1975) with travellers' accounts: 'Travellers in Greece from the fifteenth century to 1821', or with printed material regarding the chronicle of Greek typography: 'Outset of Greek typography' (1976) radically altered Konstantinos Staikos interests as collector and from then on he consciously turned to the study and research of the pioneers of Greek printing and the relations they cultivated with the world of books in Venice and elsewhere.

His acquaintance with Georgios Ladas, who was profoundly conscious of the role played by printed books during the Ottoman domination and who collected and documented the bibliographic identity of an enormous number of books that came into his hands, empowered Konstantinos Staikos' intention to explore the chronicle of Greek typography in greater depth.

The initial approach was to record printers' marks and emblems characterizing printed Greek books, resulting in the planning of the Charta of Greek Printing. At the same time the collection began to take shape, with the purchase of books entirely compatible with the terms regulating the Hellenic Bibliography as recorded by É. Legrand, printed material, that is to say, testifying to the pains and labours of the printing workshops.

From 1986 the most representative body of the Konstantinos Staikos collection, covering the works and the days of Greek scholars and printers active in the period of the Italian Renaissance (late fourteenth – mid-sixteenth centuries) became the object of exhibitions for the promotion of their work. First editions by Manuel Chrysoloras, George of Trebizond, Cardinal Bessarion, Theodoros Gazis, Zacharias Kallierges, Nikolaos Vlastos and numerous others were presented successively in Florence (1986); the Benaki Museum (1987); Geneva University (1988); Strasburg (1989) and elsewhere. These exhibitions were accompanied by detailed bilingual catalogues, compiled in collaboration with M.I. Manoussakas, with introductory notes and extensive commentaries for each book. The ultimate goal of these exhibitions was the promotion of the inestimable and decisive contribution of the Greek scholars of the period to the diffusion of Greek letters and to demonstrate: the relations they cultivated with the supreme Humanists of Italy, many of whom had been their pupils.

Examples from the collection were exhibited at the Hellenic Institute of Byzantine and Post-Byzantine Studies in Venice in 1993, with landmark editions by Aldus Manutius, the products of literary editors by renowned Greek scholars such as Marcus Musurus and Ioannes Gregoropoulos. In Austria, at Vienna's Imperial Library nearly all the Greek books published/printed there (1749–1800) were exhibited, which were the most significant examples of the Neohellenic Enlightenment.

In celebration of the Five Hundred Years since the establishment of the first Greek printing press (Venice 1499), the Greek Parliament Foundation assigned to Triantafyllos Sklavenitis and Konstantinos Staikos the organization of an exhibition of the most important material of the whole period: a considerable number of incunables and printed material deriving for the greater part from his library.

== Onassis Foundation ==
In 2010 the Collection was acquired by the Onassis Foundation in order to be preserved as perpetual property of the Greek Nation.
