= A Child's Christmas in Wales =

Mid-20th-century prose work by Dylan Thomas

The dust cover of the first pressing of Dylan Thomas' A Child's Christmas in Wales (1955)

A Child's Christmas in Wales is a piece of prose written by the Welsh poet Dylan Thomas and recorded by Thomas in 1952. Emerging from an earlier piece he wrote for BBC Radio, the work is an anecdotal reminiscence of a Christmas from the viewpoint of a young boy, portraying a nostalgic and simpler time. It is one of Thomas's most popular works.

As with his poetry, A Child's Christmas in Wales does not have a tight narrative structure but instead uses descriptive passages in a fictionalised autobiographical style, designed to create an emotive sense of the nostalgia Thomas is intending to evoke, remembering a Christmas from the viewpoint of the author as a young boy. Thomas searches for a nostalgic belief in Christmases past—"It was snowing. It was always snowing at Christmas"—furthering his idyllic memory of childhood by describing the snow as being better and more exciting than the snow experienced as an adult. The dissertation, with exaggerated characters for comedic effect, show how childhood memories are enlarged through youthful interpretation.

== Publishing history ==
Thomas had recorded work for the BBC since 1937, when he read poetry on air and talked about being a poet. His radio work provided a minor source of income; in the early 1940s he began writing radio scripts and in late 1942 he wrote a 15-minute talk that was broadcast by the Welsh BBC in February 1943 titled Reminiscences of Childhood. This was followed by Quite Early one Morning in 1944, recorded in Wales and produced by Aneirin Talfan Davies. After being well received in Wales, Davies offered the recording of Quite Early one Morning to the BBC in London for national broadcast but the producers at the BBC were unimpressed by what was described as Thomas' "breathless poetic voice" and it was rejected.

In 1945, the producer of the Welsh Children's Hour, Lorraine Davies, wrote to Thomas suggesting a talk entitled "Memories of Christmas". Thomas thought that this was "a perfectly good title to hang something on", and by the autumn he had finished work on a reading for the show. It was accepted by BBC in London, but Derek McCulloch (Uncle Mac), the presenter and producer of Children's Hour, was unhappy about allowing the "notoriously tricky" Thomas to read the piece live, which was the normal practice of the show. In a letter to Thomas, McCulloch wrote there were technical reasons that prevented their recording it live on that day. Thomas recorded the work in advance.

Almost five years later, Thomas enlarged his 1945 BBC talk "Memories of Christmas", merging in sections of an essay written for Picture Post in 1947 titled "Conversation about Christmas". In 1950, he sold the work to Harper's Bazaar for $300 who published it under the title "A Child's Memories of a Christmas in Wales".

On his 1952 tour of America, Thomas was visited at the Chelsea Hotel by college graduates Barbara Cohen and Marianne Roney, who believed that there were commercial possibilities in the United States for recordings of poetry. After previously finding little interest from American backers in medieval music and Shakespeare recitals, the women had turned to the recording of contemporary authors reading their own works. Thomas agreed to making a 45-minute LP record and an initial fee of $500 for the first 1,000 records sold and a 10% royalty thereafter. Holdridge and Mantell were unable to find an interested publishing company. They were forced to pay Thomas the initial fee, and a contract for that purpose was drawn up between Thomas and Caedmon Records, the women's company.

On 22 February 1952, Thomas recorded five of his poems: "In the white giant's thigh", "Fern Hill", "Do not go gentle into that good night", "Ballad of the Long-legged Bait", and "Ceremony After a Fire Raid". When they asked him what he would use to fill up the LP's B-side, rather than more poetry, Thomas preferred a story. He could not remember its actual title and said that he wanted to read, as he phrased it, "A Child's Christmas in Wales". On the day of recording, Thomas arrived at the studio without a copy of his story. A copy of Harper's Bazaar from 1950 containing the text had to be found for his reading. Roney later stated that she believed Thomas may have been drunk during the recording. It sold modestly at first, going on to become one of his most loved works and launching Caedmon into being a successful company.

One year after making this recording, Thomas died in New York aged 39. In 1954, the story was first published in book format as part of the American pressing of "Quite early one morning" and published the following year under its own title, A Child's Christmas in Wales.

Thomas' original 1952 recording of A Child's Christmas in Wales was a 2008 selection for the United States National Recording Registry, stating that it is "credited with launching the audiobook industry in the United States".

== Illustrations ==
The prose readily lends itself to being illustrated, and the original 1959 pressing by Caedmon Records' New Directions contained five wood-block engravings by Fritz Eichenberg.

In subsequent editions, the 1968 Dent pressing featured woodcuts by Ellen Raskin. The 1978 publication by Orion Children's was illustrated by Edward Ardizzone, and was followed by a 1985 version by Holiday House with images by Trina Schart Hyman.

== Adaptations ==
A Child's Christmas in Wales has been adapted for the theatre, for film and television, and animation:

- Welsh musician John Cale wrote and recorded a song, "Child's Christmas in Wales", on his album Paris 1919 (1973). The song is inspired by, rather than an adaptation of, A Child's Christmas in Wales, although elsewhere Cale has recorded settings of Thomas' verse.
- In 1982, the Great Lakes Shakespeare Festival in Cleveland, Ohio commissioned a stage adaptation of the work by Jeremy Brooks and Adrian Mitchell.
- Denholm Elliott starred in the television film adaptation, A Child's Christmas in Wales (1987).
- Marillion recorded a spoken-word-over-music version released on their fan club Christmas CD, Pudding on the Ritz (2008).
- In 2008, a Welsh language animated version was produced for S4C, which was voiced by actor Matthew Rhys who played Dylan Thomas in the film The Edge of Love (2008).
- Mark Watson wrote A Child's Christmases in Wales starring Ruth Jones. Broadcast as part of the Christmas 2009 season on BBC Four, it was described as peeping into the Christmases of a South Wales family during the 1980s.
- Welsh musician Al Lewis wrote and recorded "A Child's Christmas in Wales" in 2013. The song is also inspired by, rather than an adaptation of, A Child's Christmas in Wales. The music video for the song features scenes shot in 5 Cwmdonkin Drive, birthplace of Dylan Thomas. This song was covered by Gary Barlow and Aled Jones on Barlow's 2021 album The Dream of Christmas.
- In 2025 the Lucky Chance in Frome, Somerset, held a stage production of A Child's Christmas, adapted and direct by Emma Rice. The Guardian gave this a five star review: "exquisite Dylan Thomas adaptation has magic in every scene."

== Bibliography ==
- Ferris, Paul (1989). Dylan Thomas, A Biography. New York: Paragon House. ISBN 1-55778-215-6.
