= Barbara Holdridge =

American recording executive (1929–2025)

- Born: Barbara Ann Cohen; July 26, 1929; New York City, U.S.
- Died: June 9, 2025 (aged 95); Baltimore, Maryland, U.S.
- Education: Hunter College; Columbia University
- Occupation: Recording executive
- Known for: Co-founder of Caedmon Records
- Spouse: Larry Holdridge (m. 1959)

Barbara Ann Holdridge (née Cohen; July 26, 1929 – June 9, 2025) was an American recording executive. Together with her business partner, Marianne Mantell, she co-founded Caedmon Records in 1952. As an entirely female-owned company Caedmon stressed gender equality and focused on many women's writings. She was a pioneer in the genre of spoken word literary recordings, and is considered to have laid the foundation for modern audio books.

== Early life and education ==
Barbara Ann Holdridge née Cohen was born on July 26, 1929, in New York City.

Holdridge attended Hunter College in New York, receiving her BA in 1950 after majoring in Humanities. She was elected to Phi Beta Kappa, and graduated cum laude. She continued her graduate education in Humanities at Columbia University, also in New York, but then turned her attention to founding Caedmon Records with her college friend Marianne Roney, in 1952.

== Career ==
In 1952 Holdridge was working for Liveright Publishers in New York and Roney (later Mantell) was employed by a New York recordings producer. When they heard that the Welsh poet Dylan Thomas was going to be speaking at the 92nd Street YMCA, they went to hear him read his poetry. The partners sent Thomas a note offering him a business proposition: to record Thomas reading his poetry and the partners would market the recording under their newly conceived record label, Caedmon Records.

=== Caedmon Records ===
Thomas agreed, and on February 22, 1952, at Steinway Hall, Thomas, Holdridge and Mantell made history with the poet's reading of his story, “A Child's Christmas in Wales” on the B side of the album. According to The Library of Congress, the record "has been credited with launching the audiobook industry." The company was named for the 7th-century poet Cædmon, the first English poet known by name.

The partners set up a small office in New York and began to invite other poets and authors to read their own works. The line-up of writers included Thomas Mann, E. E. Cummings, Archibald MacLeish, Ernest Hemingway, Marianne Moore, Eudora Welty, Katherine Anne Porter and many more.

By 1959, Caedmon had revenues of $500,000, and by 1966 Caedmon had grossed $14 million and had 36 employees working in its 8,000-square-foot (743 m^{2}) office in midtown Manhattan.

The partners sold Caedmon in 1970 to DC Heath and Company, a subsidiary of Raytheon. Holdridge remained with Caedmon for an additional five years as president of the reorganized company.

=== Post-Caedmon ===
Holdridge founded Stemmer House Publishers in 1975, the first general book publishers established in the state of Maryland. Stemmer published both fiction and non-fiction works. The company became known for its children's books, and their International Design Library. In 2003 she sold Stemmer House Publishers.

Holdridge taught book publishing and writing at Loyola College as an adjunct professor. She created Apprentice House Publishers as a hands-on learning project for her courses. The Loyola Department of Communications took it over as an ongoing publishing entity.

Until her death, Holdrige continued to do research on Ammi Phillips, and was considered the authority on the artist, who is now renowned among art historians, art critics and connoisseurs of American art. Her oral account of the couple's discovery of Phillips, previously unknown, as an American master of portraiture was recorded in 2022 by the Museum of American Folk Art for its series on important American art research and researchers.

== Personal life and death ==
In 1959 Barbara Cohen married Larry Holdridge a self-employed Baltimore, Maryland hydraulic engineer, and she then moved to Maryland. Together they raised twin daughters, Eleanor and Diana.

Holdridge was an avid gardener, and her gardens have been included on tours conducted by the Maryland House and Garden Pilgrimage and the Maryland Horticultural Society.

Holdridge died in Baltimore, Maryland on June 9, 2025, at the age of 95.

== Awards and recognition ==
In 2002 Holdridge was inducted into the National Women’s Hall of Fame and subsequently the Maryland Women's Hall of Fame. She is also an inductee of Sigma Tau Delta, the English Honorary Society. She, together with Marianne Mantell, was given a Special Lifetime Achievement Award at the Audie Awards in 2001 for founding Caedmon Records.

Together with her husband, Holdridge is recognized as the co-discoverer and researcher of the 19th-century American portrait painter Ammi Phillips, whose works were on display at important museums as several different unknown American masters. Larry and Barbara Holdridge were recognized and honored by the Museum of American Folk Art for their important contribution to art.

For her dedication to creating its gardens and beautifying the grounds of her home the 18th century Stemmer House in Owings Mills, Maryland, Holdridge received an award from the Baltimore County Historical Trust in 2007. She was serving on the board of directors of Phi Beta Kappa Alumni Association of Greater Baltimore at the time of her death.
