= Caedmon Audio =

Record label

- Founded: 1952
- Founder: Barbara Cohen; Marianne Roney
- Distributor: HarperAudio
- Genre: Spoken Word
- Country of origin: United States
- Official website: Harper Audio

Caedmon Audio and HarperCollins Audio are record label imprints of HarperCollins Publishers that specialize in audiobooks and other literary content. Formerly Caedmon Records, its marketing tag-line was Caedmon: a Third Dimension for the Printed Page. The name changed when the label switched to CD-only production.

== Caedmon history ==
Caedmon Records was a pioneer in the audiobook business, it was the first company to sell spoken-word recordings to the public and has been called the seed of the audiobook industry. Caedmon was founded in New York City in 1952 by college graduates Barbara Cohen (later Barbara Holdridge) and Marianne Roney (later Marianne Mantell).

The label's first release was a collection of poems by Dylan Thomas as read by the author. The B-side contained A Child's Christmas in Wales, which was added as an afterthought; the story was obscure and Thomas himself could not remember its title when asked what to use to fill up the LP's B-side. However, this recording went on to become one of his most loved works, and launched Caedmon as a successful company. The original 1952 recording was a 2008 selection for the United States National Recording Registry, stating it is "credited with launching the audiobook industry in the United States".

The company went on to record other notable writers reading their own works, such as W. H. Auden, Robert Frost, T. S. Eliot, Ernest Hemingway, Gertrude Stein, and many more. The label expanded further to encompass other types of spoken-word recordings, including children's stories, speeches, plus English- and foreign-language classics. Theater performances were also staged for the label, starring either the Shakespeare Recording Society or the Theatre Recording Society, depending on the playwright. These performances included many famous actors and actresses, including Anthony Quayle, Claire Bloom, Richard Burton, Albert Finney, John Gielgud, Siobhán McKenna, Michael Redgrave, Vanessa Redgrave, Felix Aylmer, Paul Scofield, Alec McCowen, Donald Pleasence, Ralph Richardson, Max Adrian, and Maggie Smith, among others. Other notable readers for the label included Vincent Price, Basil Rathbone, and Louis Jourdan.

Raytheon, which also owned D. C. Heath and Company, bought Caedmon in 1971. Harper & Row (now HarperCollins) purchased the label in 1987.

== Selected discography ==
This partial discography provides an idea of the range of literary and acting talent that Caedmon was able to record and distribute.

- Dylan Thomas Reading, Volume 1 (TC 1002)
- Laurence Olivier (TC 1003)
- Thomas Mann Reading (German) (TC 1004)
- Tennessee Williams Reading (TC 1005)
- Katherine Anne Porter Reading Downward Path (TC 1006)
- The Catcher in the Rye (read by Ray Hagen) (TC 1007)
- Chaucer: Nun's Priest's, Pardoner's Tales (Middle English) (TC 1008)
- Archibald MacLeish Reading (TC 1009)
- Eudora Welty Reading (TC 1010)
- Peter Marshall Speaks (TCR 101/TC 1011)
- Sean O'Casey Reading (TC 1012)
- Osbert Sitwell Reading (TC 1013)
- Israel Is Born (TC 1014)
- Ogden Nash Reading (TC 1015)
- Edith Sitwell Reading (TC 1016)
- E. E. Cummings Reading (TC 1017)
- Dylan Thomas Reading, Volume 2 (TC 1018)
- W. H. Auden Reading (TC 1019)
- Colette Reading (TC 1020)
- Hearing Poetry, Volume 1 (TC 1021)
- Hearing Poetry, Volume 2 (TC 1022)
- The Rubiyat (read by Alfred Drake) (TC 1023)
- Millay Poetry (read by Judith Anderson) (TC 1024)
- Marianne Moore Reading (TC 1025)
- Wordsworth Poetry (read by Cedric Hardwicke) (TC 1026)
- Mark Twain (read by Walter Brennan, Brandon deWilde) (TC 1027)
- Edgar Allan Poe (read by Basil Rathbone) (TC 1028)
- Baudelaire Reading (read by Eva LeGallienne, Louis Jourdan), (French) (TC 1029)
- Wellsprings of Drama (TC 1030)
- Everyman (read by Burgess Meredith) (TC 1031)
- The Second Shepherd's Play (TC 1032)
- Dr. Faustus (read by Frank Silvera) (TC 1033)
- Greek Prose and Poetry (Greek) (TC 1034)
- William Faulkner Reading (TC 1035)
- Frank O'Connor Reading (TC 1036)
- Leaves of Grass, Volume 1 (read by Ed Begley) (TC 1037)
- Just So Stories, Volume 1 (read by Boris Karloff) (TC 1038)
- Conrade Aiken Reading (TC 1039)
- The Red Badge of Courage (read by Edmond O'Brien) (TC 1040)
- Vachel Lindsay Reading (TC 1041)
- Poetry of Byron (read by Tyrone Power) (TC 1042)
- Dylan Thomas Reading, Volume 3 (TC 1043)
- Wilde Fairy Tales (read by Basil Rathbone) (TC 1044)
- T. S. Eliot Reading (TC 1045)
- Walter de la Mare Reading (TC 1046)
- William Carlos Williams Reading (TC 1047)
- Poetry of Browning, Volume 1 (read by James Mason) (TC 1048)
- 17th Century Poetry (read by Cedric Hardwicke, Robert Newton) (TC 1049)
- Gertrude Stein Reading (TC 1050)
- Sermons of Donne (read by Herbert Marshall) (TC 1051)
- Book of Judith, Ruth (read by Judith Anderson, Claire Bloom) (TC 1052)
- Psalms and David (read by Judith Anderson) (TC 1053)
- Cambridge Treasury of English Prose: Malory to Donne, Volume 1 (TC 1054)
- Cambridge Treasury of English Prose: Burton to Johnson, Volume 2 (TC 1055)
- Cambridge Treasury of English Prose: Defoe to Burke, Volume 3 (TC 1056)
- Cambridge Treasury of English Prose: Austen to Bronte, Volume 4 (TC 1057)
- Cambridge Treasury of English Prose: Dickens to Butler, Volume 5 (TC 1058)
- Poetry of Shelley (read by Vincent Price) (TC 1059)
- Robert Frost Reading (TC 1060)
- Dylan Thomas Reading, Volume 4 (TC 1061)
- Grimm's Fairy Tales (read by Joseph Schildkraut) (TC 1062)
- Joyce's Ulysses (read by Siobhán McKenna, E. G. Marshall) (TC 1063)
- Frank Lloyd Wright Speaking (TC 1064)
- Diego Rivera Speaking (Spanish) (TC 1065)
- Robert Graves Reading (TC 1066)
- Lorca (read by Maria Douglas, Raul Dantes) (Spanish) (TC 1067)
- Wallace Stevens Reading (TC 1068)
- Noel Coward Duologies (read by Noël Coward, Margaret Leighton) (TC 1069)
- Ecclesiastes (read by James Mason) (TC 1070)
- E. B. Browning Sonnets/Barretts of Wimpole Street (read by Katharine Cornell, Anthony Quayle) (TC 1071)
- German Lyric Poetry (read by Lotte Lenya) (German) (TC 1072)
- Andersen Fairy Tales (TC 1073)
- Reluctant Dragon (read by Boris Karloff) (TC 1074)
- Pied Piper/Hunting of the Snark (read by Boris Karloff) (TC 1075)
- The Book of Job (read by Herbert Marshall) (TC 1076)
- Child's Garden of Verses (read by Judith Anderson) (TC 1077)
- Nonsense Verse (read by Beatrice Lillie, Cyril Ritchard, Stanley Holloway) (TC 1078)
- Juan Ramon Jimenez Reading (Spanish) (TC 1079)
- Poetry of Tennyson (read by Sybil Thorndike, Lewis Casson) (TC 1080)
- Poetry of Yeats (read by Siobhán McKenna, Cyril Cusack) (TC 1081)
- Henry Mencken Speaking (TC 1082)
- Jean Cocteau Reading (French) (TC 1083)
- Stephen Spender Reading (TC 1084)
- Song of Songs/Heloise & Abelard (read by Claire Bloom, Claude Rains) (TC 1085)
- Joyce's Finnegans Wake (read by Siobhán McKenna, Cyril Cusack) (TC 1086)
- Poetry of Keats (read by Ralph Richardson) (TC 1087)
- Just So Stories, Volume 2 (read by Boris Karloff) (TC 1088)
- Rootabaga Stories (read by Carl Sandburg) (TC 1089)
- Moll Flanders (read by Siobhán McKenna) (TC 1090)
- Mother Goose (read by Cyril Ritchard, Boris Karloff, Celeste Holm) (TC 1091)
- Poetry of Coleridge (read by Ralph Richardson) (TC 1092)
- Boswell's London Journal (read by Anthony Quayle) (TC 1093)
- Apple Cart and Poems by Noël Coward (read by Noël Coward, Margaret Leighton) (TC 1094)
- Picture of Dorian Gray (read by Hurd Hatfield) (TC 1095)
- Genesis (read by Judith Anderson) (TC 1096)
- Alice in Wonderland (read by Joan Greenwood, Stanley Holloway, Cast.) (TC 1097)
- Through the Looking Glass (read by Joan Greenwood, Stanley Holloway, Cast.) (TC 1098)
- Gulliver's Travels (read by Michael Redgrave) (TC 1099)
- Kipling's Jungle Books: How Fear Came (read by Boris Karloff) (TC 1100)
- The Bab Ballads of WS Gilbert and The Cautionary Tales by Hilaire Belloc, (read by Stanley Holloway and Joyce Grenfell), (TC1104)
- Ezra Pound Reading (TC 1122)
- Jeeves (P. G. Wodehouse), "Indian Summer of an Uncle" and "Jeeves Takes Charge" (read by: Judith Furse, Miles Malleson, Terry-Thomas, Rita Webb, Avril Angers, and Roger Livesey), (TC-1137) (mono), 1958, and (TC01137-S), stereo, 1964
- Ezra Pound Reading, Volume 2 (TC 1155)
- Poems and Songs of Middle Earth (read by J. R. R. Tolkien) (TC 1231)
- The Strange Case of Dr. Jekyll and Mr. Hyde (read by Anthony Quayle, illustrated by Wayne Anderson) (TC 1283)
- What Is Puerto Rico? and Miguel Robles—So Far (read by Geraldo Rivera) (TC 1431)
- Alligator Pie and Other Poems (read by Dennis Lee) (TC 1530)
- Why Mosquitoes Buzz in People's Ears and Other Tales (read by Ruby Dee and Ossie Davis) (TC 1592)
- Dominic by William Steig (Read by Pat Carroll) (TC 1738)
- Churchill in His Own Voice: and the Voices of His Contemporaries (read by Laurence Olivier and John Gielgud) (TC 2018)

== See also ==
- List of record labels
