= The Hellenic Library of the Onassis Foundation =

- Ωνάσειος Βιβλιοθήκη
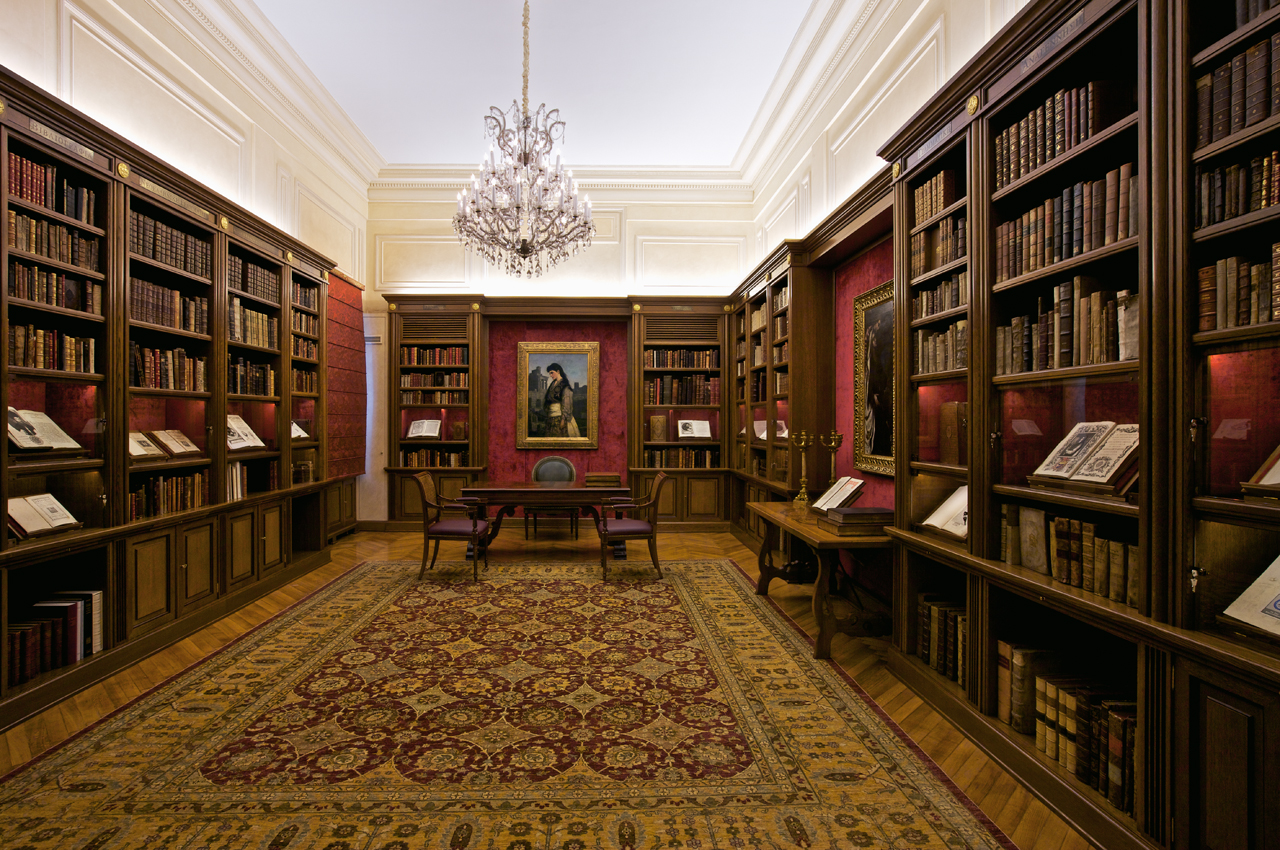
- The main area of the library
- 37.97004553772598°N 23.731478605516035°E
- Location: Athens, Greece
- Established: 2010 (16 years ago)

Collection
- Items collected: books, journals, magazines, and manuscripts from 15th to 19th century.
- Criteria for collection: The Library accumulates books representing the intellectual activity of the Greeks, whether of the secular world or of the Church, from the period of the Italian Renaissance until the late years of Neo-Hellenic Enlightenment.

The Hellenic Library of the Onassis Foundation is a library that includes part of the Konstantinos Sp. Staikos' book collection. It is housed in the neoclassical building at 56 Amalias Avenue Plaka, Athens, Greece. The library that was acquired by the Onassis Foundation.

== The Philosophy of the Book Collection ==
The genesis of the formation regarding the collection dates 1970s. From the early 1980s, the library had become a fundamental tool for my systematic search for every printed book able to cast light on the printing and publishing course taken by Greeks from the years of the Italian Renaissance onward, without any geographic differentiation.

From 1986 the most representative body of its collection, covering the works and the days of Greek scholars and printers active in the period of the Italian Renaissance (late fourteenth - mid-sixteenth centuries) became the object of exhibitions for the promotion of their work. First editions by Manuel Chrysoloras, George of Trebizond, Cardinal Bessarion, Theodoros Gazis, Zacharias Kallierges, Nikolaos Vlastos and numerous others were presented successively in Florence (1986); the Benaki Museum (1987); Geneva University (1988); Strasburg (1989) and elsewhere. These exhibitions were accompanied by detailed bilingual Catalogues, compiled in collaboration with M.I. Manoussakas, with introductory Notes and extensive commentaries for each book. The ultimate goal of these exhibitions was the promotion of the inestimable and decisive contribution of the Greek scholars of the period to the diffusion of Greek letters and to demonstrate: the relations they cultivated with the supreme Humanists of Italy, many of whom had been their pupils.

Subsequently, more representative material, according to circumstance, of the whole collection was brought out in historic libraries and foundations of countries such as Italy, at the Hellenic Institute of Byzantine and Post-Byzantine Studies in Venice in 1993, with landmark editions by Aldus Manutius, the products of literary editors by renowned Greek scholars such as Markos Mousouros and Ioannes Gregoropoulos. In 1995, in Austria, at Imperial Court Library, nearly all the Greek books published/printed there (1749-1800) were exhibited, which were the most significant examples of the Neohellenic Enlightenment. In celebration of the Five Hundred Years since the establishment of the first Greek printing press (Venice 1499), the Hellenic Parliament Foundation assigned to Triantafyllos Sklavenitis and Konstantinos Staikos the organization of an exhibition of the most important material of the whole period.

== The area of the library ==
The area of the library was designed by Konstantinos Staikos. The stacks were designed in the spirit of stable structures that characterize the internal architecture and decorations used as timber oak. Their style is Doric and half columns that make up the skeleton of the stacks resulting in a rosette, with the mark of the Onassis Foundation in carved and gilded wood. The shelves are movable and the lower tier of the library are lockable cabinets. For the benefit of scholars and librarians are at the height bolts connecting the two parts of the library.

The stacks, as ordered in space, create five separate elements, corresponding to the five sections of the library: Renaissance - Humanism, Modern Literature, Liturgical books, Theology and Enlightenment. These thematic units identified in the stacks with embossed brass plates in each section of the library. The shelves are all numbered as the books were classified in each one of them. In each section of the library was built a showcase, self-luminous and appropriately decorated for the exhibition of books representative of each department, even insured with unbreakable protective glazing. Finally, a movable metal rod insures free access to books and protect them from "impulsivity."

== The Library Collection ==
The Library has about 1400 titles in nearly 2000 separate volumes. The works are grouped into five basic categories.

- Renaissance – Humanism
- Neo-Hellenic Literature
- Liturgical Books
- Travel Literature
- Treatises of Theology
- Neo-Hellenic Enlightenment

Most of these books are from publishers in Venice or those who print books for the Greek-speaking public.

== Information ==
The library is not open to the public. Organized visits take place by appointment only.

== See also ==
- List of libraries in Greece
