= Onassio Cardiac Surgery Centre =

Onassio Cardiac Surgery Centre Ωνάσειο Καρδιοχειρουργικό Κέντρο

Geography
- Location: Kallithea, Attica, Greece

Organisation
- Care system: Public cardiology hospital
- Type: Clinical

Services
- Emergency department: Yes

History
- Founded: 1992; 34 years ago

Links
- Website: www.onasseio.gr

The Onassio Cardiac Surgery Centre (Greek: Ωνάσειο Καρδιοχειρουργικό Κέντρο) or simply Onassio (Ωνάσειο) is a model hospital, specialized in adult and pediatric heart diseases, and is a donation of the non-profit Alexander S. Onassis Foundation to the Greek State.

It is a non-profit legal entity under private law and operates under the supervision of the Greek Ministry of Health. It is located in Kallithea, Athens, at the end of Syngrou Avenue (Syngrou 356).

The Onassio Cardiac Surgery Center was the scene where the last act of the active political life of Andreas Papandreou, prime minister of Greece and protagonist of its public life for decades, took place. For 4 months, from 29 November 1995 to 21 March 1996, Papandreou was hospitalized at Onassio submitting his resignation as prime minister on 15 January 1996.

== History ==
One of the goals of the "Alexander S. Onassis" Charitable Foundation (which was founded in 1975 by the daughter of Aristotle Onassis, Christina) was the creation of a modern cardiac surgery center in Athens, since, while cardiac surgeries had already begun to be performed in Greece, the capabilities of state hospitals could not meet the needs of the Greek population, resulting in the ever-increasing exodus of a large number of heart patients abroad.

Construction work began in October 1987 (the foundation stone was laid on October 8, 1987, by the then Prime Minister Andreas Papandreou (1919-1996), who was to become the most famous patient of Onassios) and was completed in September 1992. On October 6, 1992, the official opening of the operation took place of the center.

Onassio cost a total of 75 million dollars (at the exchange rate prevailing in 1992) and is located on an area of 8,000 sq.m. A large part of the total cost was allocated to furnishing the center with the most advanced technical means of operation and the most modern scientific instruments.
