= A. Edward Newton =

American writer, publisher and book collector

A. Edward Newton

Alfred Edward Newton (1864–1940) was an American industrialist better known as an author and avid book collector. He is best known for his book Amenities of Book Collecting (1918) which sold over 25,000 copies. At the time of his death, it was estimated that he had approximately 10,000 books in his collection, focusing on English and American literary works, the major part of which were auctioned by Parke-Bernet Galleries, New York in April, May, and October 1941. Highlights of the sale included the autograph manuscripts of Thomas Hardy's novel Far From the Madding Crowd and Charles Lamb's essay Dream Children. However, the fall in rare book prices steadily through the Great Depression meant that many sold lots brought only a fraction of prices they would have realized at the time of the Jerome Kern sale in 1929. The three volume Newton sale catalogue remains a useful reference for literature collectors.

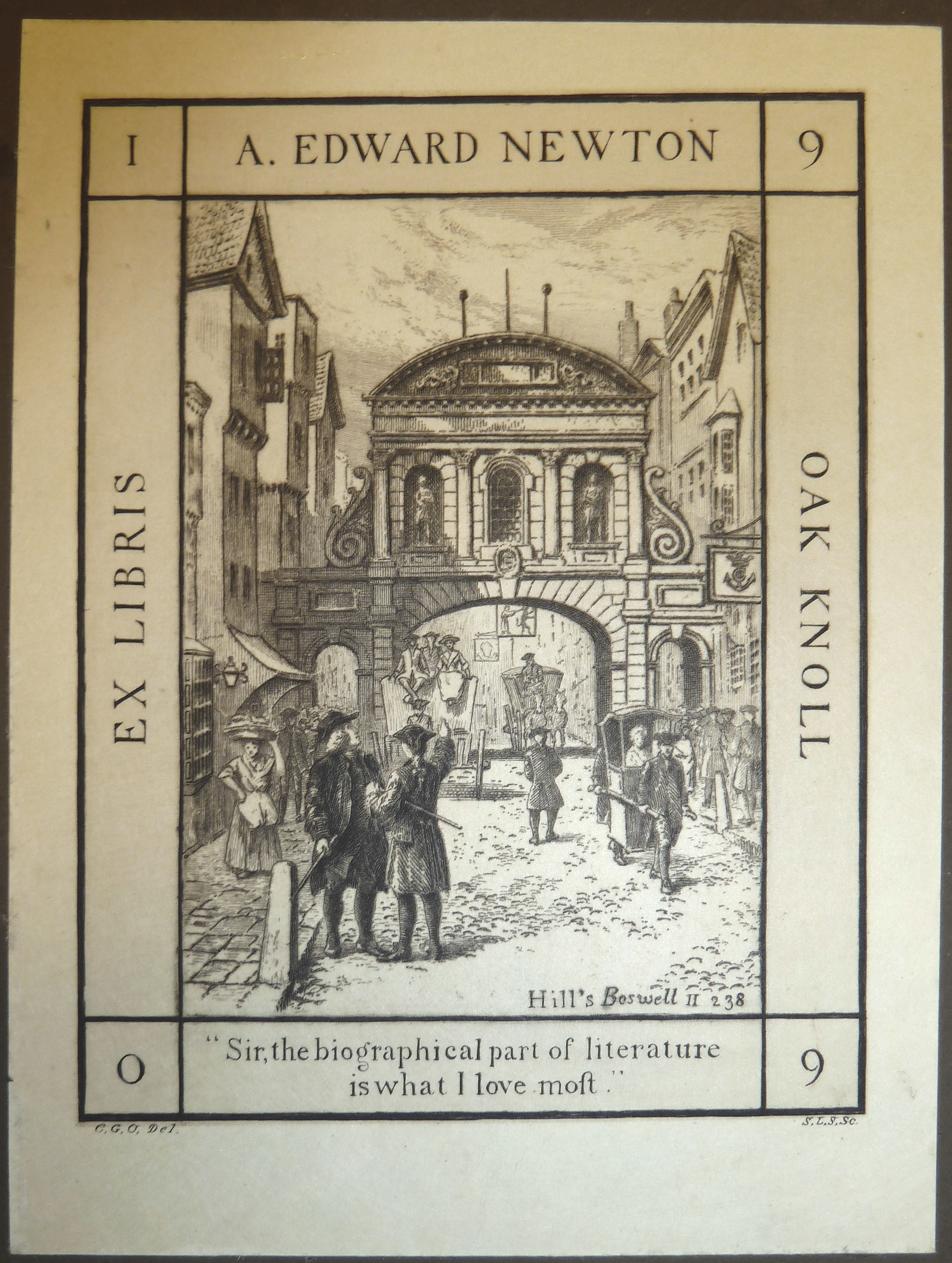
A. Edward Newton Bookplate

Newton was a resident of Daylesford, Pennsylvania and resided in the home called Oak Knoll. Newton's bookplate referred to his home Oak Knoll and depicted an image of the London Temple Bar. The publisher Oak Knoll Books is named after Oak Knoll.

== Selected writings ==
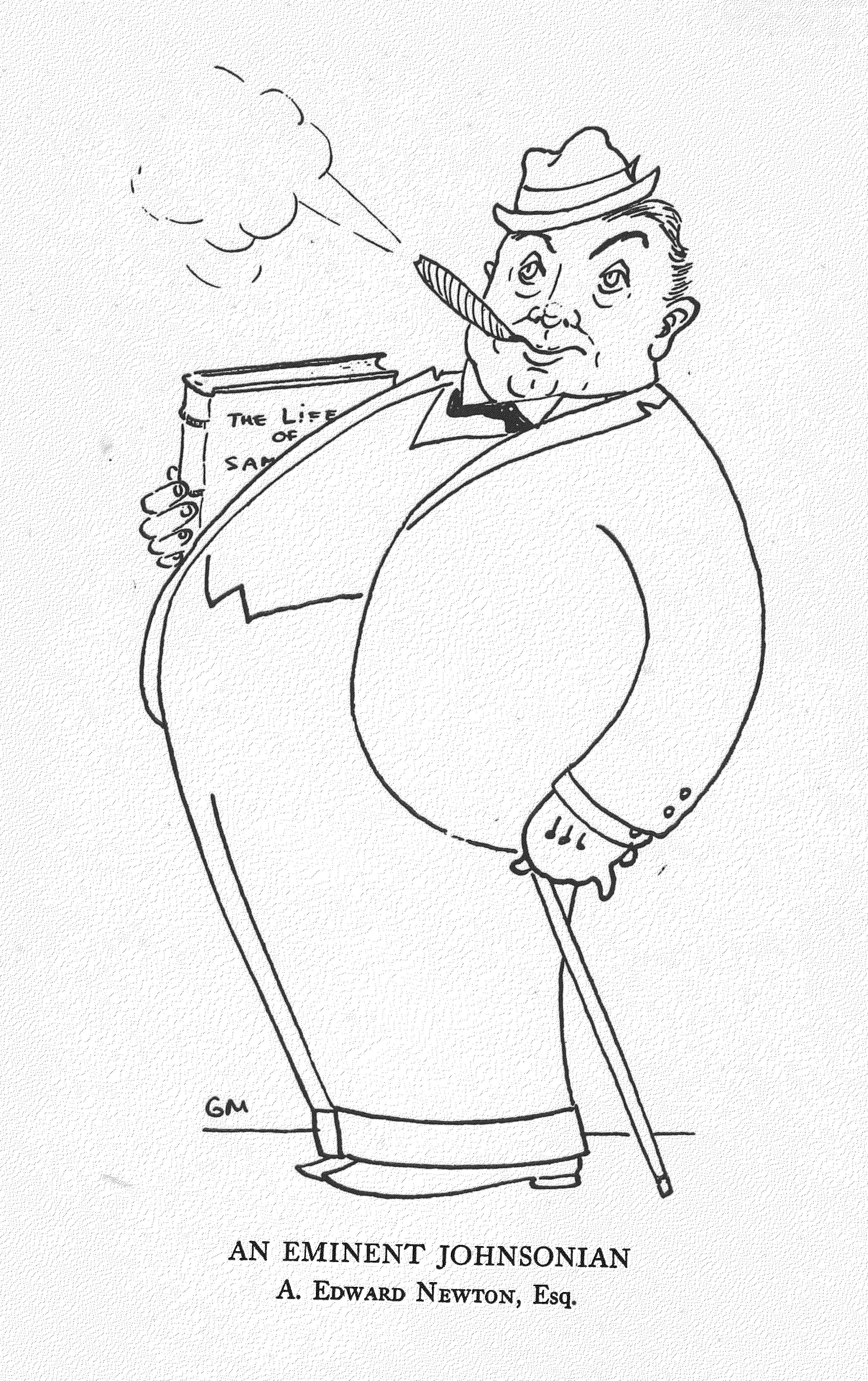
Caricature of A. Edward Newton by Gene Markey

- The Amenities of Book-Collecting and Kindred Affections (1918)
- A Magnificent Farce: and Other Diversions of a Book-collector (1921)
- This Book-Collecting Game (1928)
