= Richard Price Rummonds =

American author and publisher

Richard Price Rummonds (also known as Richard-Gabriel Price Rummonds), one of the foremost handpress printers of the late twentieth century, was also an author, publisher, typographer, and historian of printing. His two books on nineteenth-century printing, Printing on the Iron Handpress and Nineteenth-Century Printing Practices and the Iron Handpress, comprehensively describe the history, operation and merits of the iron handpress. Rummonds died in Bainbridge Island, Washington, on August 23, 2024 at the age of 93.

== Early life and education ==
Born on April 26, 1931, in Long Beach, California, Rummonds was raised in Sacramento, California. He attended Syracuse University in 1949–1950, in the School of Fine Arts, with the intention of majoring in set and costume design and the University of California at Berkeley intermittently between 1950 and 1954, where he majored in English and Creative Writing. During this period he was on the staff of Occident, the student literary magazine, of which he became the editor for the Spring 1954 issue.

== Printing career ==
Rummonds began printing in Quito, Ecuador in 1966, using the Plain Wrapper Press imprint. His first book was a selection of his own poems. The following year in Buenos Aires, Argentina, he printed a book of his short stories.

At a lecture in New York in November 1968, given by the Veronese printer Giovanni Mardersteig operator of the private press Officina Bodoni, Rummonds met Mardersteig’s son, Martino, who introduced Rummonds to the iron handpress. From 1969 on Rummonds printed all of his books on iron handpresses. The following year Rummonds moved his publishing venture and printing equipment to Verona, Italy, where he remained until 1982. During the spring of 1975, John V. Richardson Jr. apprenticed to Rummonds and carried plates to Pomodoro, before returning to the US to start a doctoral program at Indiana University. Alessandro Zanella joined Rummonds at the Plain Wrapper Press in 1976, eventually becoming a partner in 1978.

During this period in Verona he printed one of the greatest of twentieth-century fine-press publications: Siete Poemas Sajones / Seven Saxon Poems by Jorge Luis Borges with impressions by Arnaldo Pomodoro. Anthony Rota, the London antiquarian bookseller, was referring to this book when he wrote “It is seldom that editorial, typographical, and practical printing skills are as evenly matched and as successfully combined as they are in the fortunate case of Mr. Richard-Gabriel Rummonds.”

Among his other publications are Three Poems of Passion by C. P. Cavafy with intaglio prints by Ger van Dijck; Will and Testament: A Fragment of Biography by Anthony Burgess with screenprints by Joe Tilson; Prima Che Tu Dica “Pronto”/Before You Say “Hello” by Italo Calvino with woodcuts by Antonio Frasconi; Atlantic Crossing by John Cheever; and Journeys in Sunlight by Dana Gioia with etchings by Fulvio Testa.

== Teaching experience ==
Between 1977 and 1996, Rummonds taught in the Graduate School of Library Service at the University of Alabama in Tuscaloosa, Alabama. He was the founding director of the MFA in the Book Arts Program. Subsequently, he offered workshops on printing on iron handpresses throughout the world as well as giving numerous lectures on fine printing.

== Exhibitions ==
There were two major retrospective exhibitions of his work: the first in 1981 at the New York Public Library, about which Edwin McDowell in The New York Times, wrote “[NYPL] is featuring what is considered to be one of its most beautiful exhibitions ever.” The second was in 1999 at the Biblioteca di Via Senato in Milan, Italy.

== Publications ==
=== Books by Rummonds ===
- Rummonds, Richard. Eight Parting Poems. Quito, Ecuador: Plain Wrapper Press, 1966.
- Rummonds, Richard. 1945–1965: An Evaluation of Two Decades of Self-Deception. Buenos Aires, Argentina, Plain Wrapper Press, 1967.
- [Rummonds,] Gabriel. The Ill-Timed Lover. Verona, Italy: Plain Wrapper Press, 1972.
- Fletcher, Cora C. [nom de plume of Richard Rummonds]. The Emperor's Lion. Verona, Italy: Plain Wrapper Press, 1976.
- Rummonds, Gabriel. Seven Aspects of Solitude. Cottondale, AL: Ex Ophidia, 1988.
- Rummonds, Richard-Gabriel. Problem Solving and Printing on the Cast-Iron Handpress. Rochester, NY: Rochester Institute of Technology, 1991.
- Rummonds, Richard-Gabriel. A Sampler of Leaves from Plain Wrapper Press and Ex Ophidia Books with a foreword by Decherd Turner. Austin, TX: Digital Letterpress, 1996.
- Rummonds, Richard-Gabriel. Printing on the Iron Handpress with a foreword by Harry Duncan. New Castle, DE: Oak Knoll Press and London: The British Library, 1998.
- Rummonds, Richard-Gabriel. Nineteen-Printing Practices and the Iron Handpress with a foreword by Stephen O. Saxe. New Castle, DE: Oak Knoll Press and London: The British Library, 2004.
- Rummonds, Richard-Gabriel. Fantasies & Hard Knocks: My Life as a Printer Port Townsend, WA: Ex Ophidia Press, 2015.

=== Short fiction by Rummonds since 1950 ===
- “The Green Lift” (under the nom de plume Denise More) in Occident, University of California at Berkeley, Fall 1950, pp. 49–55.
- “The Little Boy in the Bell Glass” in Occident, Spring 1951, pp. 41–44.
- “Mrs. Bebe Bear and the Announcing Angel’s Egg” in Occident, University of California at Berkeley, Spring 1953, pp. 14–15.
- “The Emperor’s Lion” (under the nom de plume Cora C. Fletcher) in Occident, University of California at Berkeley, Spring 1954, pp. 2–4.
- “The Woman with Her Mouth Open” by Luigi Santucci (translated from the Italian by Gabriel Rummonds). Reprinted from the Plain Wrapper Press edition in Boulevard: Journal of Contemporary Writing, Vol. 2, no. 3 (Fall 1987), pp 1–18.

== Books and articles about Rummonds ==
- Smyth, Elaine. Plain Wrapper Press, 1966–1988: An Illustrated Bibliography of the Work of Richard-Gabriel Rummonds with a foreword by Decherd Turner. Austin, TX: Thomas W. Taylor, 1993.
- Un Tipografo fra Due Culture: Richard-Gabriel Rummonds, a catalog for an exhibition at the Biblioteca di Via Senato. Milan, Italy: Electa, 1999.
- Jones, Jim. “The Printer of the Plain Wrapper Press Becomes a Memoirist” The Journal of the Book Club of Washington. Volume 14, Number 2. Seattle: The Book Club of Washington, 2014.
