= Onassis Stegi =

Cultural center in Greece

Coordinates: 37.9579°N 23.7192°E

Onassis Stegi logo.

Onassis Stegi (Greek: Στέγη Ιδρύματος Ωνάση), formerly known as the Onassis Cultural Center (Greek: Στέγη Γραμμάτων και Τεχνών του Ιδρύματος Ωνάση), is a cultural venue in Athens, Greece, owned by the Onassis Foundation which was established by Aristotle Onassis. Afroditi Panagiotakou is the Artistic Director of the Onassis Foundation.

== Architecture ==
The Onassis Stegi is located on Syngrou Avenue and occupies a total area of 18,000 square meters. Its construction began in 2004 on a privately owned three-acre parcel of land funded by the Onassis Foundation. It was designed by the French architecture firm, Architecture-Studio, which was selected through a competitive process. It consists of a complex that includes two main halls, with seating capacities of 900 and 200 seats. Various events are held in the halls, including theater and dance performances, concerts, film screenings, lectures, and conferences. The building also has an exhibition space and a restaurant.

== Opening ==
The building's opening ceremony took place on December 7, 2010, in the presence of the President of the Hellenic Republic, Karolos Papoulias and other dignitaries. The first production presented on the Main Stage of the Onassis Stegi, directed by Michael Marmarinos, was inspired by Bertolt Brecht’s poem "Questions from a Worker Who Reads." and it was a tribute to the construction workers who built the cultural center. The venue officially opened to the public on December 11, 2010, presenting a variety of concerts and theater performances.

== Activity ==
Onassis Stegi supports contemporary culture, presenting works in collaboration with artists from Greece, host performances by established artists, invest in the integration of works with advanced technologies, and support newcomer artists from various fields through scholarships and awards. Moreover, it hosts discussions about human rights, democracy, social justice, and the climate crisis which are open to the public. Over the years, various artists and authors from Greece and abroad have collaborated with Onassis Stegi including notable actresses, choreographers, writers, directors, musicians, artists, and more. It is estimated that approximately 300,000 people visit its premises annually. In addition, events under Onassis Stegi are organized in the wider metropolitan area of Athens.

During the COVID-19 pandemic in Greece, Onassis Stegi made its performance archive accessible on YouTube for free.

The Onassis Foundation opens Six Rings, a two-story concept store in Athens open to the public combining fashion, culture and emerging talents coexist with established names in contemporary design, including workshops and mentoring programs.

Onassis AiR is an international artistic research and residency program of the Onassis Foundation in Athens.

The online radio station of Onassis Foundation Stegi Radio broadcasts 24 hours a day, 7 days a week.

=== Performing arts and concerts ===
The Onassis Stegi has presented several theater, dance, and music performances, such as Can We Talk About This? by DV8 (2011), Refuse the Hour by William Kentridge (2012), Aristophanes’ The Birds by Nikos Karathanos, The Great Tamer by Dimitris Papaioannou and Akram Khan’s Xenos. Music concerts are also held there.

=== Αrtworks at public space ===
The Onassis Stegi, in collaboration with the Municipality of Athens, has presented a series of artworks by Greek artists, in various city sites, including Avdi Square in Metaxourgeio, Patision Street, Omonia Square and Neos Kosmos.

In 2021, Onassis Stegi organized an exhibition at Pedion Areos in Athens called You and AI. It was an open-air group exhibition dedicated to the presence and impact of artificial intelligence in humans' everyday lives. The following year, Stegi organized another exhibition at Pedion Areos, displaying digital art Plásmata: Bodies, Dreams, and Data, presenting 25 works by Greek and foreign artists. In 2023, Plásmata II was held in Ioannina.

=== Collaborations ===
Onassis Stegi participates in co-productions in Greece and abroad by inviting foreign artists and also by supporting the promotion of Greek culture worldwide. Among the institutions and theaters with which the Onassis Stegi has collaborated through the years are Emilia Romagna Teatro (Italy), Münchner Kammerspiele (Germany), Théâtre de la Ville (Paris, France), Kampnagel (Germany), Théâtre de Liège (Belgium), Almeida Theatre (UK), Internationaal Theater Amsterdam (The Netherlands), Théâtre de Vidy, and Teatro della Pergola.

== Political-Social Stance ==
Apart from its cultural dimension, Onassis Stegi takes a public stand regarding several social and political issues, including the trial of the Golden Dawn neo-Nazi political party, the court proceedings for the murder of LGBTQI+ activist Zak Kostopoulos, the anniversary of the Alexandros Grigoropoulos murder etc. Further on, Olympic champion Sofia Bekatorou made her sexual abuse known for the first time through a Onassis Stegi seminar that addressed gender violence, marking the beginning of the Greek #MeToo movement. Moreover Stegi created the documentary Tack, about the sexual abuse cases of Bekatorou and Amalia Proveleggiou. It was released on November 25, 2024, during the International Day for the Elimination of Violence Against Women.

Stegi was the first cultural organization in Greece to conduct "blind" recruitment interviews to eliminate stereotypes.

== Gallery ==
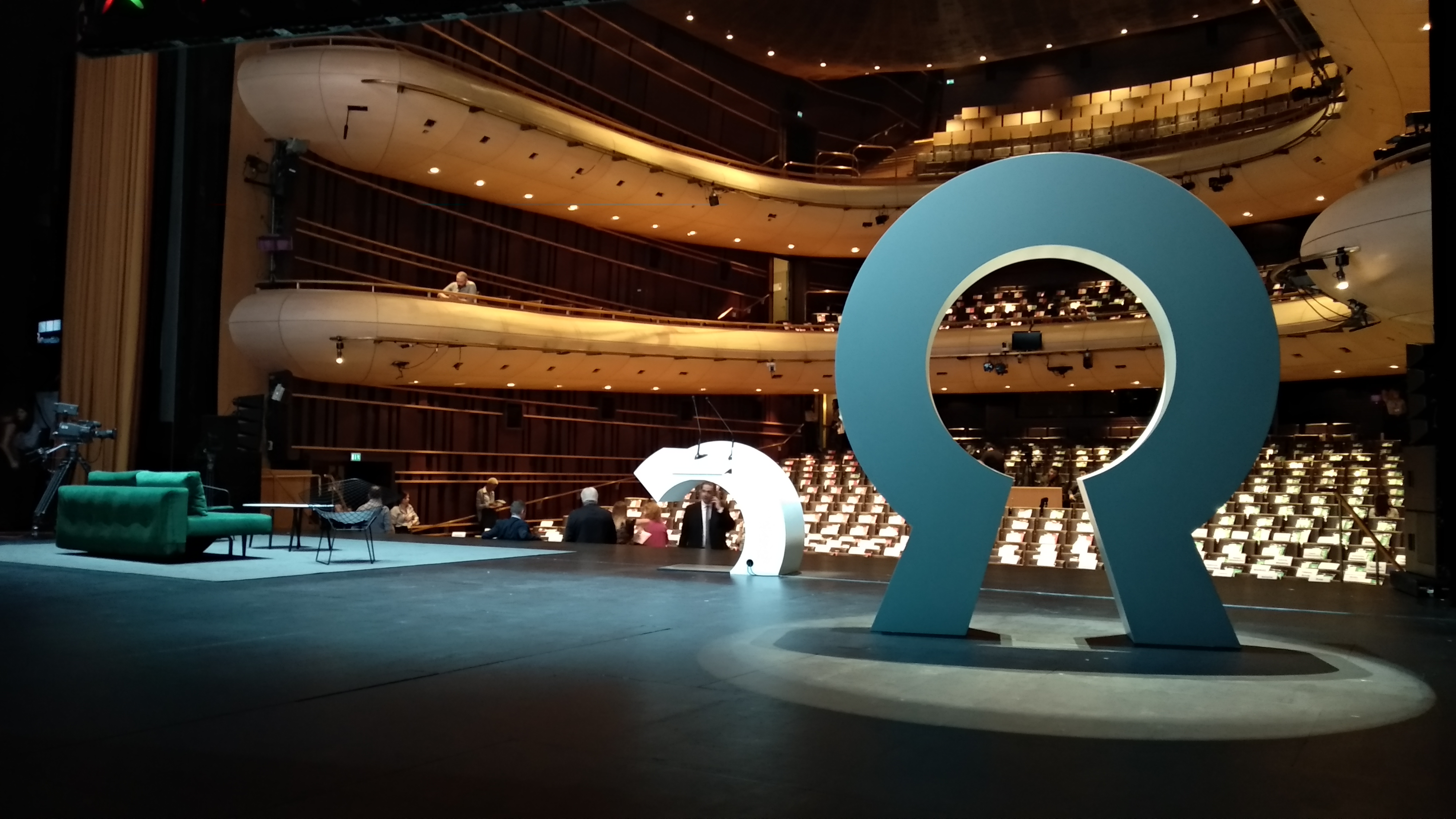

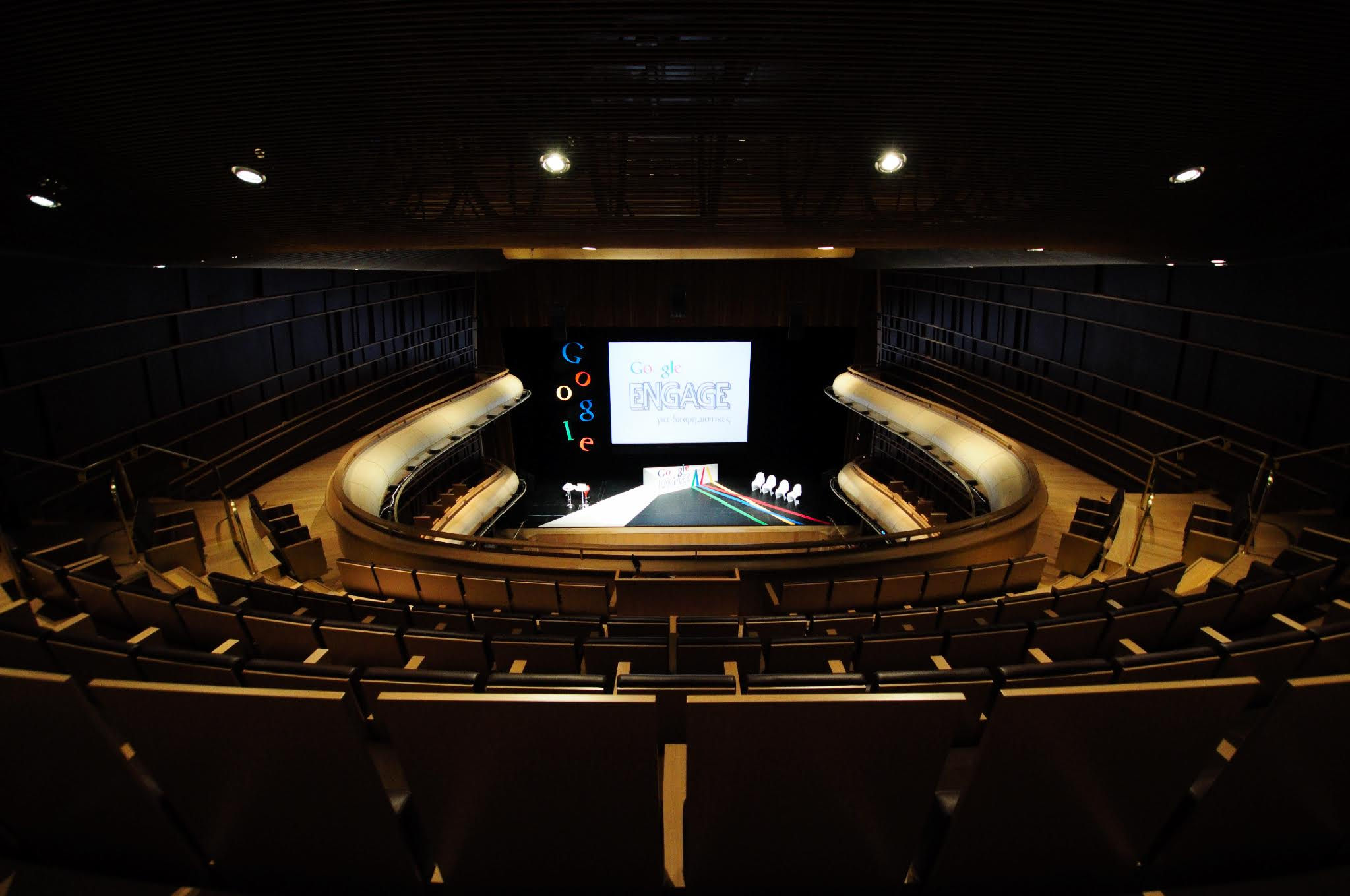

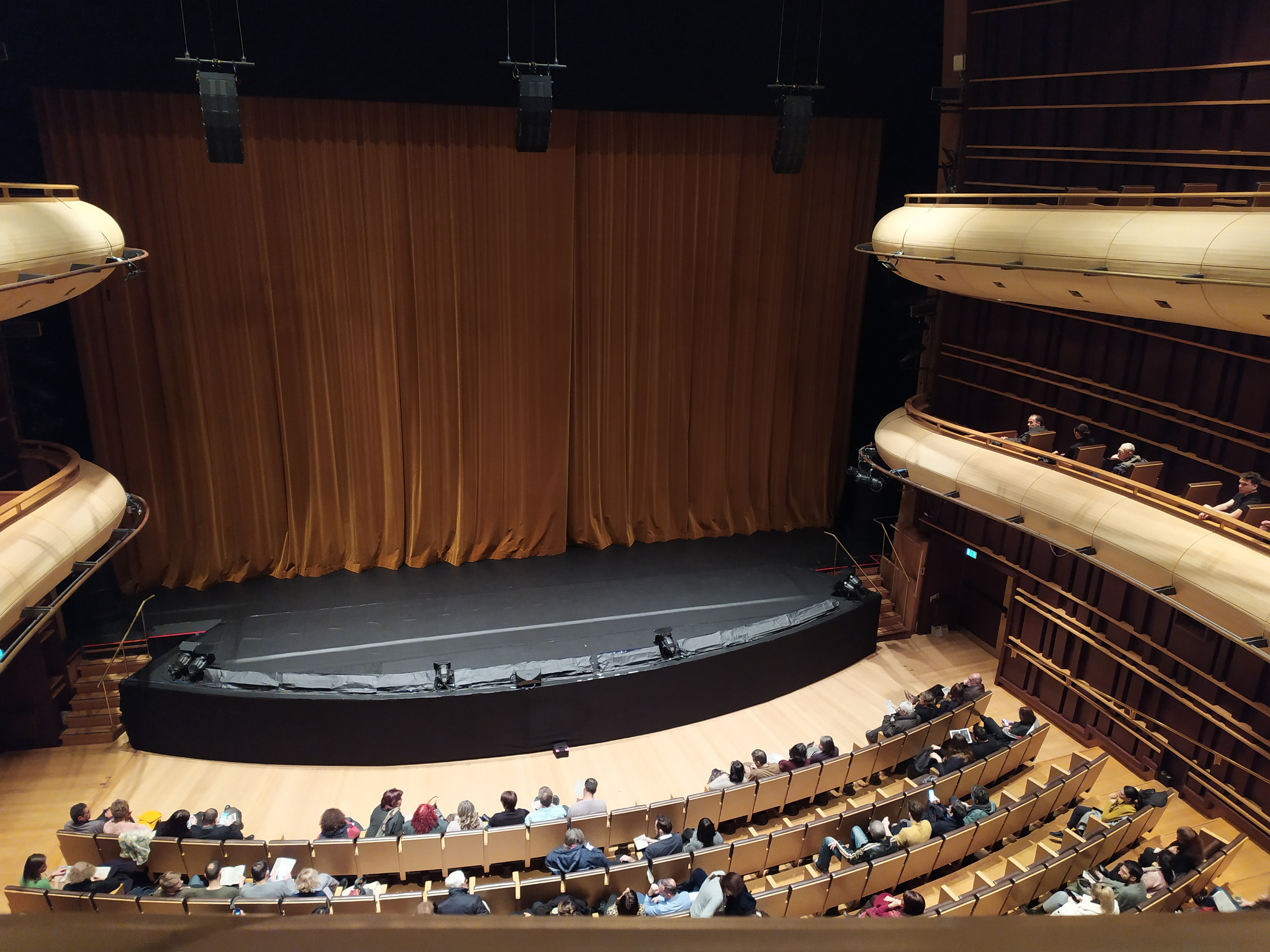

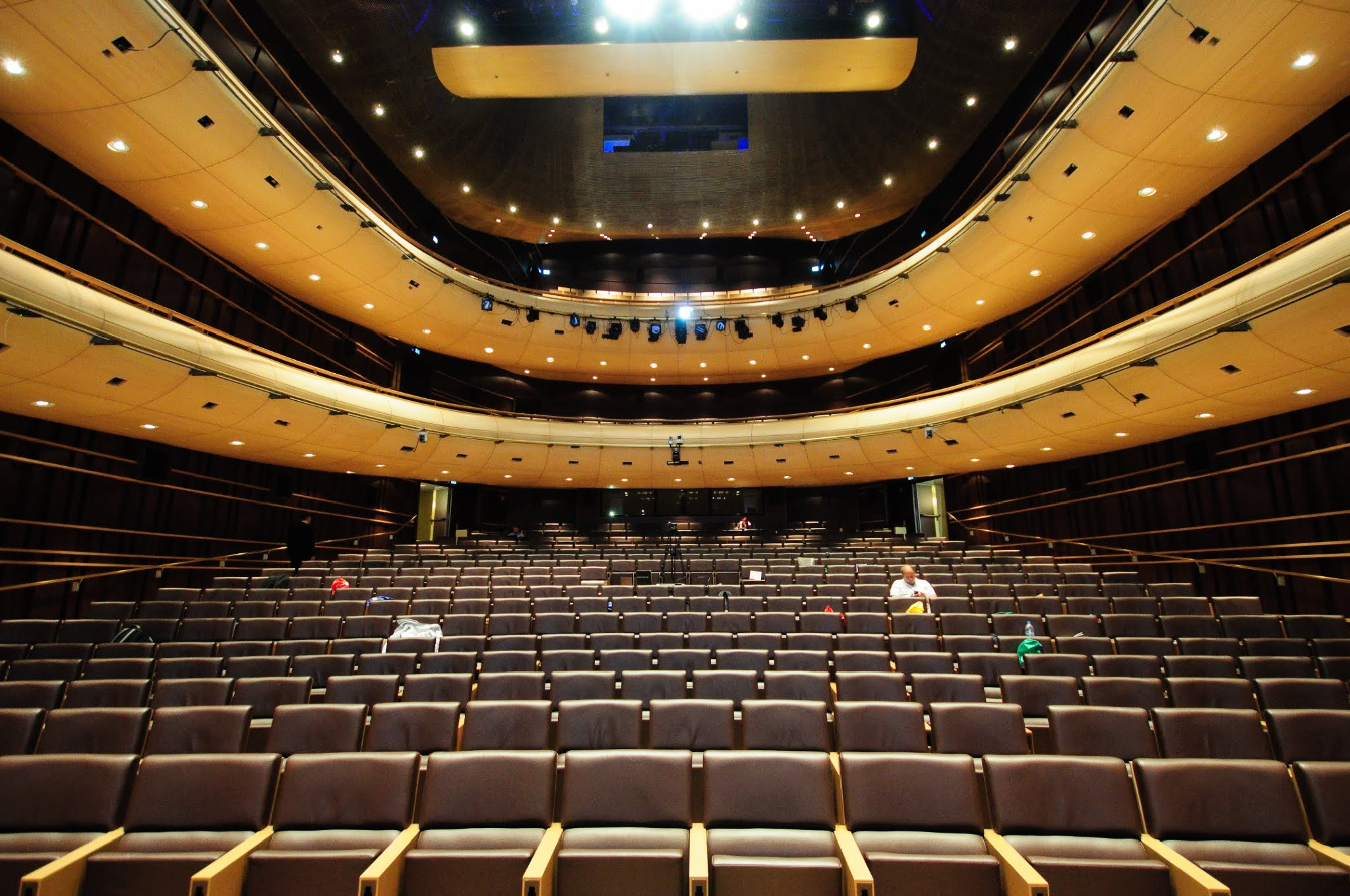

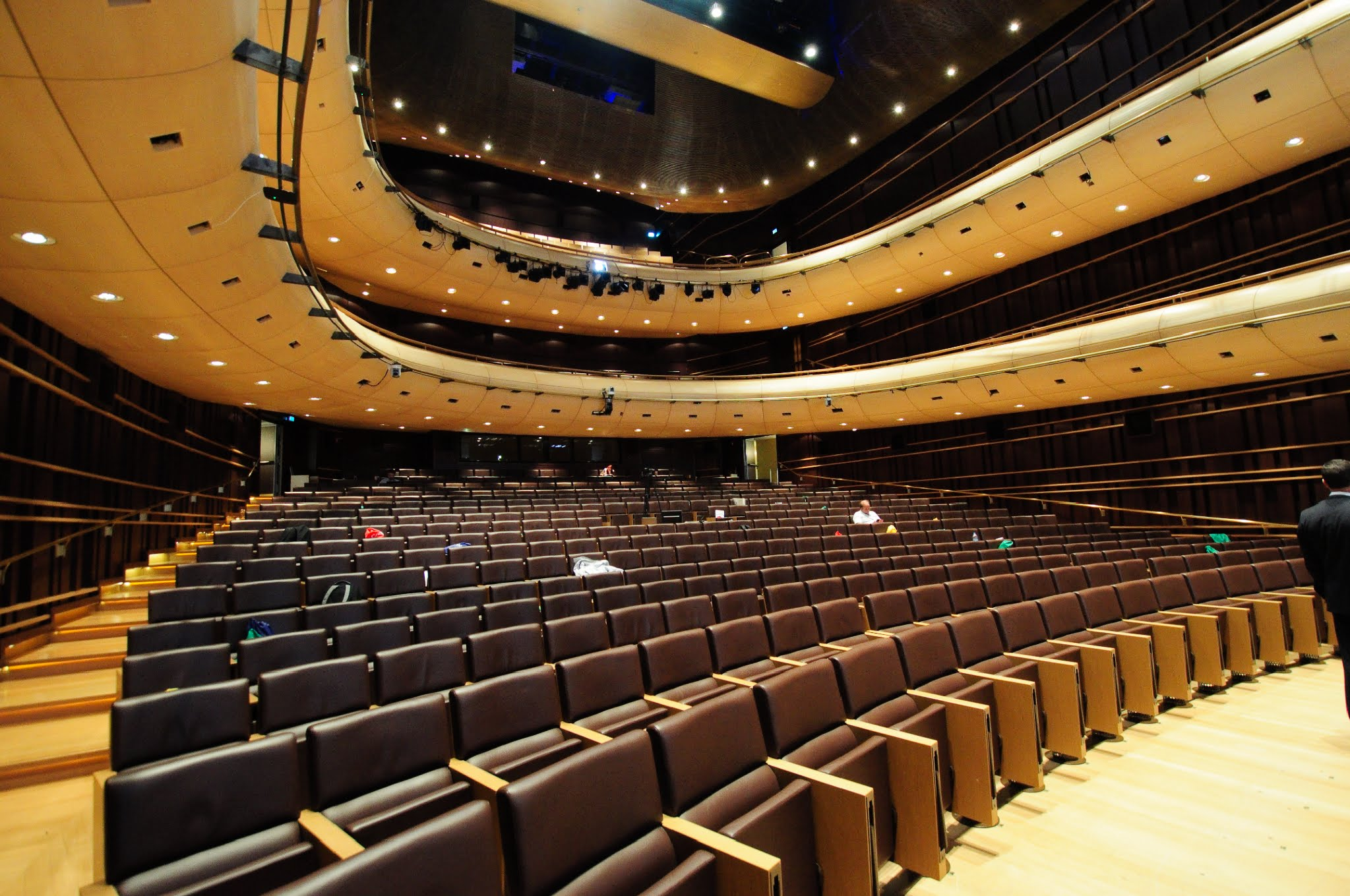

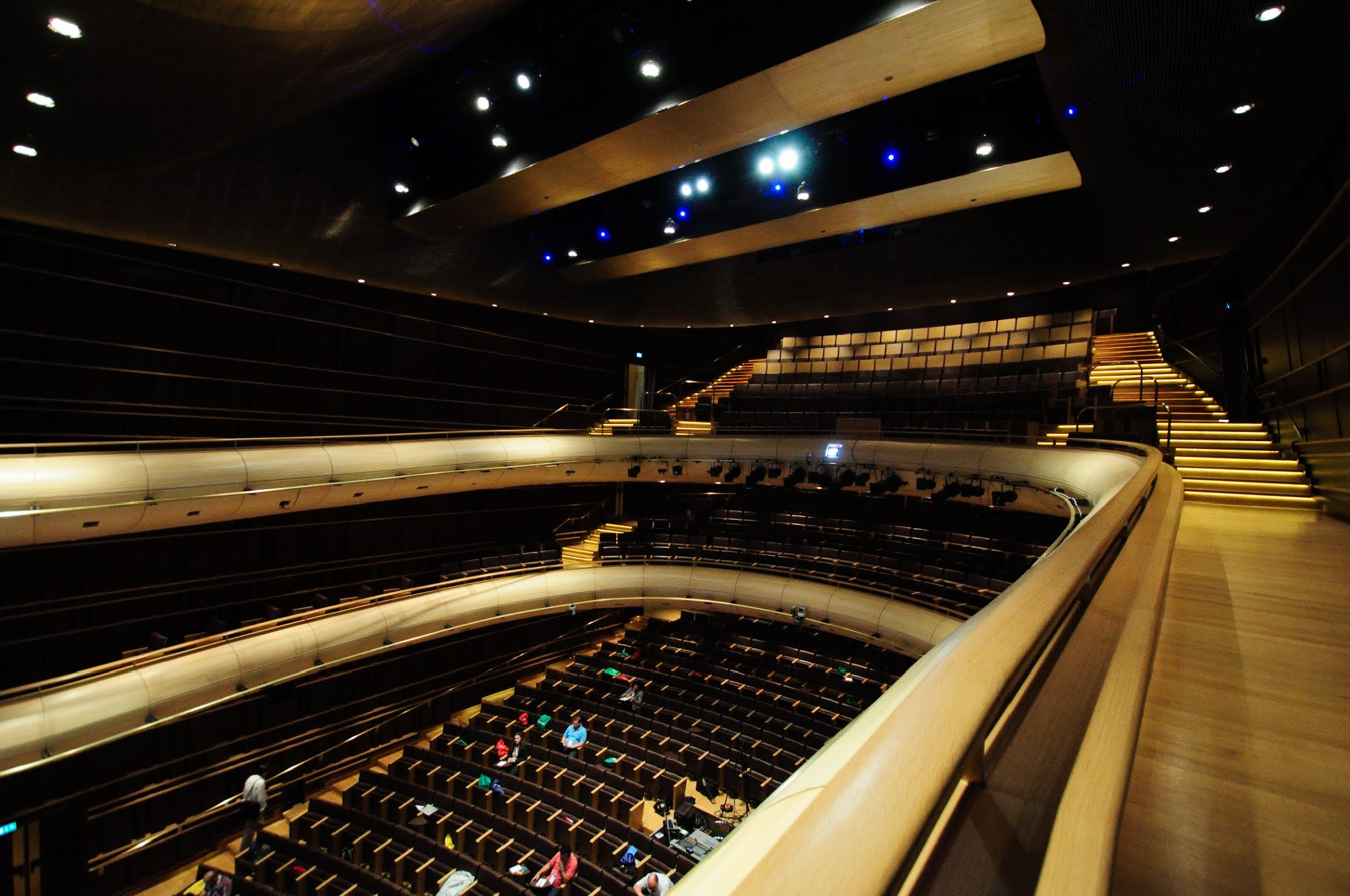
