= St. Paul's Bibliographies =

St. Paul's Bibliographies was a publishing company founded by Robert S. Cross (1925–2011) in 1979 in Winchester, England that specialized in bibliographical works and book history more generally. In the 1980s, the firm co-published in the US with Omnigraphics of Detroit. In 1992 the firm began co-publishing with Oak Knoll Press, and in 1993 Oak Knoll took over US distribution. In 1997 St. Paul's Bibliographies was purchased by Oak Knoll Press who continued many of its series under its own publishing imprint. Oak Knoll continued to issue publications under the St. Paul's Bibliographies imprint until 2015.

St. Paul's Bibliographies published a wide variety of books, many of their publications were issued in the context of several series including the Winchester Bibliographies of Twentieth-Century Writers, the Publishing Pathways Series, and the Print Network Series.

== Important series and titles ==
=== Winchester Bibliographies of Twentieth-Century Writers ===
- Ezra Pound: A Bibliography, by Donald Gallup, 1983
- A Bibliography of the Writings of Robert Graves, Fred H. Higginson and William Proctor, 1987
- H.E. Bates: A Bibliographical study by Peter Eads, 1990.
- Eric Gill: a Bibliography, 1991.
- Leonard Woolf: A Bibliography, by Leila Luedeking and Michael Edmonds. 1992.
- W.H. Davies: A Bibliography, by Sylvia Harlow, 1993.
- Anthony Powell, A Bibliography. by George Lilley with a foreword by Anthony Powell, 1993.
- Elspeth Huxley, A Bibliography, by Robert Cross and Michael Perkin, 1996.
- Julian Symons, A Bibliography, by John J. Walsdorf, 1996.
- George Orwell: A Bibliography, by Gillian Fenwick, 1998
- Vita Sackville-West: A Bibliography, By Robertt Cross and Ann Ravenscroft-Hulme, 1999
- Arthur Ransome: A Bibliography, by Wayne G, Hammond, 2000
- Kay Boyle: A Bibliography, by M. Clark Chambers. 2002

=== Publishing Pathways Series ===
Published papers from the annual Book Trade History Conference edited by Myers, Robin, Michael Harris and Giles Mandelbrote. St. Paul's Bibliographies published this series in the UK between 1988 and 2000, Earlier editions in the series were published by Oxford Polytechnic Press and later volumes in the series were published by the British Library.

- Pioneers in bibliography, 1988.
- Fakes and frauds: varieties of deception in print & manuscript, 1989
- Spreading the word: the distribution networks of print 1550–1850, 1990
- Property of a gentleman: the formation, organisation and dispersal of the private library 1620–1920,1991.
- Censorship & the control of print: in England and France 1600–1910, 1992
- Serials and their readers, 1620–1914, 1993.
- A millennium of the book: production, design & illustration in manuscript & print, 900–1900, 1994.
- A genius for letters: booksellers and bookselling from the 16th to the 20th century, 1995.
- Antiquaries, book collectors, and the circles of learning, 1996.
- The book trade & its customers, 1450-1900 : historical essays for Robin Myers, 1997.
- Medicine, mortality, and the book trade, 1998.
- The human face of the book trade: print culture and its creators, 1999.
- Journeys through the market: travel, travellers and the book trade, 1999.

=== Print Network Series ===
Collected papers from the annual British Book Trade History Seminar Series, later renamed the Print Networks conference series. The lecture series was founded by Peter Isaac and the published papers were edited by Peter Isaac and Barry McKay. After 2000 the series was published by Oak Knoll Press.

- Images & Texts: their production and distribution in the 18th and 19th centuries, 1997.
- The reach of print:making, selling, and using books, 1998.
- The human face of the book trade: print culture and its creators, 1999.
- The Might Engine: the printing press and its impact, 2000.

=== References ===
- https://www.oakknoll.com/okpstpauls.php
