= Oak Knoll Books and Press =

American bookseller and publisher

Oak Knoll is a bookseller and publisher based in New Castle, Delaware, United States. Oak Knoll includes Oak Knoll Books which specializes in the sale of rare and antiquarian books and Oak Knoll Press which is a publisher and distributor of in-print titles. Both divisions specialize in "books about books" on topics such as printing history, bibliography, and book arts. Oak Knoll has also been the sponsor of the book arts festival Oak Knoll Fest.

== About ==
Oak Knoll in New Castle, DE

Oak Knoll Books was founded in 1976 in Newark, Delaware by Robert D. (Bob) Fleck Jr. (1947–2016). He founded Oak Knoll Press in 1978. Both parts of Oak Knoll specialize in books "about book collecting, book selling, bibliography, libraries, publishing, private press printing, fine printing, bookbinding, book design, book illustration, calligraphy, graphic arts, marbling, papermaking, printing, typography and type specimens plus books about the history of these fields."

Robert Fleck was a collector of works by A. Edward Newton a popular writer of books about book collecting in the 1920s. Oak Knoll was named after Newton's Daylesford, PA home. Newton's bookplate became the inspiration for many of the early Oak Knoll Books catalogs covers and became a symbol for Oak Knoll Books. The motto on Newton's bookplate also became a motto for the business "Sir, the biographical part of literature is what I love most." a quote from James Boswell.

Oak Knoll has had a variety of locations, it first opened in Newark, DE in 1976 and later it moved to New Castle, DE. In New Castle, it has been located at 212 Delaware Street and 414 Delaware Street. In August 1998, it moved to the New Castle Opera House at 310 Delaware Street where it operates today. After the passing of Robert D. Fleck Jr. in 2016, his widow, Mildred Fleck, became owner, and his son Rob Fleck, III, became Director.

Oak Knoll is a member of several professional organizations, including the Antiquarian Booksellers' Association of America, the International League of Antiquarian Booksellers, and the Association of American Publishers. In addition to the catalogs and publications related to the various parts of the firm for a time the business also published a general newsletter called Oak Leaves.

== Oak Knoll Books ==
Currently, Oak Knoll Books has an inventory of about 29,000 titles. It publishes regular catalogs devoted to antiquarian books. Directors of the Antiquarian department have included Andrew Armacost (1994–2004) and Rob Fleck, III (2008-). Like many antiquarian booksellers the firm used a unique price code to mark its books and record their source and price paid.

Catalogs have historically been devoted to books about books and bibliography although some catalogs have been devoted to special topics or collections. Some notable antiquarian book catalogs have included:

- Catalog 8, A. Edward Newton, A Collection of his Works.
- Catalogs 10, 11, 14, 17, 19, and 22, Alida Roochvarg Collection of Books about Books
- Catalog 69, History of Bookbinding
- Catalog 86, A. Edward Newton, A Collection of his Works
- Catalog 122, Paper History and Technique, with an introduction by Paul S. Koda
- Catalogs 177, 179 and 181, History & Technique of Printing from the collection of Norman Blaustein
- Catalog 196, Biblio-fiction
- Catalog 200, Bibliography and Reference Books
- Catalog 208, The Americana Reference Library of Robert G. Hayman
- Catalog 214, The History of the Book in Great Britain
- Catalog 219, William Morris and his Kelmscott Press
- Catalogs 223 and 225 The Typographic Book (223 was issued in partnership with Heritage Book Shop)
- Catalog 229, Contemporary Private Press & Artists' Books 1980-2000 (issued in 2001 with Priscilla Juvelis, Inc., cover designed by Michael Russem)
- Catalog 246, Bookbinding, History & Technique largely from the Collections of Phiroze Randeria & Alfred Brazier
- Catalogs 254, 257, 258, From the Reference Library of H.P. Kraus
- Catalog 255 Fine Printing & Private Press in 20th Century North America
- Catalogs 266, 267, 268, Works from Questor Rare Books

== Oak Knoll Press ==
Oak Knoll Press
- Parent company: Oak Knoll Books and Press
- Founded: 1978
- Founder: Bob Fleck
- Country of origin: United States
- Headquarters location: New Castle, Delaware
- Publication types: Books
- Fiction genres: books about books
- Official website: www.oakknoll.com/oak-knoll-press.php

Oak Knoll Press was founded in 1978 and has served as a publisher of original works, has reprinted out of print classics, and has served as a distributor for other publisher's works in the fields of book history and bibliography. Publishing directors of Oak Knoll Press have included Paul Wakeman (1988–1996), John von Hoelle (1996–2006), Mark Parker Miller (started 2006) and later Matthew Young. A history and bibliography of Oak Knoll Press was published in 2008.

The first publication of the Press was a reprint of Bigmore and Wyman's A Bibliography of Printing issued in partnership with the Holland Press. In 1991 Oak Knoll Press started co-publishing with the British Library and for many years worked closely with their Director of publications David Way. Some important publications that came out of this partnership were:

- Tidcombe, Marianne, The Doves Bindery. 1991.
- Pearson, David. Provenance Research in Book History, 1994.
- Tidcombe, Marianne. Women Bookbinders, 1996
- Steinberg, Sigfrid Henry. Five Hundred Years of Printing, 1996.
- Rummonds, Richard-Gabriel. Printing on the Iron Handpress, with a foreword by Harry Duncan, 1998.
- Rummonds, Richard-Gabriel. Nineteen-Printing Practices and the Iron Handpress, with a foreword by Stephen O. Saxe, 2004.
- Middleton, Bernard, A History of English Craft Bookbinding Technique, 2006.

In 1992 the Oak Knoll Press began co-publishing with St. Paul's Bibliographies and in 1993 Oak Knoll took over US distribution. In 1997 St. Paul's Bibliographies was purchased by Oak Knoll Press who continued many of its series under its own publishing imprint. Oak Knoll continued to issue publications under the St. Paul's Bibliographies imprint until 2015. In 2000, the Press entered into a partnership with Konstantinos Staikos and published several of his works related to libraries and their history. Notable books published by Oak Knoll have included:

- Carter, John. ABC for Book Collectors
- Gaskell, Phillip. A New Introduction to Bibliography, 1995
- McKerrow, Ronald B. An Introduction to Bibliography for Literary Students, 1994.
- Bowers, Feredson. Principles of Bibliographical Description, 1994.

In 2000 the press formed a partnership with Konstantinos Staikos which led to a number of publications related to Greek publishing history and the history of libraries. Notable works were The Great Libraries (2000), the five volume History of Libraries in Western Civilization (2004–2013) and in 2006, Staikos authored a special essay, "The Mirror of the Library," which was issued in a special limited edition for the 30th anniversary of Oak Knoll Press.

In addition to publishing, Oak Knoll Press distributes publications issued by organizations such as the American Antiquarian Society, the Center for Book Arts, the Bibliographical Society of America, the Bibliographical Society (London), the Codex Foundation, the Grolier Club, the John Carter Brown Library, the Library of Congress, and the Center for the Book.

== Oak Knoll Fest ==
Oak Knoll has sponsored a festival devoted to the book arts and fine printing held in New Castle, Delaware. Started in 1994, it brings together letterpress printers and book artists, and encourages the artists themselves to represent their work to the public. Held the first weekend in October the festival has typically included: two days of the fine press bookfair, an Oak Knoll bookshop sale, and lectures on Saturday and Sunday mornings. The festival started as an annual event and became biennial in 2010. Oak Knoll Fest XXI, originally scheduled for October 2020, was rescheduled for October 2021 due to the COVID-19 pandemic.

Speakers have included a variety of press proprietors, dealers, collectors, and librarians, and have included: Carolee Campbell of the Ninja Press, Jan and Crispin Elstead of the Barbarian Press, Colin Franklin, Carol Grossman, Jerry Kelly, Simon Lawrence of the Fleece Press, Ian Mortimer of I.M. Imprimit, Graham Moss of the Incline Press, Henry Morris of the Bird & Bull Press, Barry Moser, Frances and Nicolas McDowall of the Old Stile Press, Nicholas and Mary Parry of the Tern Press, Robin Price, John Randle of the Whittington Press, Gabrielle Rummonds, Gaylord Schanalec of Midnight Paper Sales, Clair Van Vliet of the Janus Press.

Poster portfolios with letterpress broadsides printed by the exhibiting presses were produced for a number of the events:

- Oak Knoll Fest [I]1994 : the poster collection. 10 broadsides, printed by 10 separate presses, limited to 50 copies.
- Oak Knoll Fest [II] 1995 : the poster collection. 17 broadsides, limited to 50 sets.
- Oak Knoll Fest X 2003, 35 broadsides. limited to only 125 sets of which 94 are for sale.
- Oak Knoll Fest XX Portfolio, 2018. Limited to 80 numbered copies, of which 53 were available for sale.

Oak Knoll Books would issue occasional catalogs of fine press books exhibited at the annual fair, these included: Oak Knoll fest 1995: A Day of Book Arts. The Fine Press Book Association (FPBA) was formed at Oak Knoll Fest in 1996, and many of its meetings have been held in conjunction with the Fest.
