= Marianne Mantell =

American audiobook executive (1929–2023)

- Born: Marianne Roney; November 23, 1929; Berlin, Germany
- Died: January 22, 2023 (aged 93); Princeton, New Jersey, U.S.
- Occupations: Writer, audiobook executive
- Spouse: Harold Mantell (m. 1956)
- Children: 3

Marianne Mantell (née Roney; November 23, 1929 – January 22, 2023) was an American writer and audiobook executive, who founded Caedmon Audio together with Barbara Holdridge.

== Early life ==
Mantell was born in Berlin on November 23, 1929 to a Jewish family – her father Max Roney was an Austrian mechanical engineer, and her mother Serena a Hungarian-born bookkeeper. The family fled Nazi Germany in the late 1930s, settling first in London, then in New York since 1941.

In New York, Mantell graduated from the High School of Music & Art and then from Hunter College with a degree in Greek.

== Career ==
As a freelance writer, Mantell composed liner notes and translated opera librettos. After she failed to persuade records companies to publish poetry recordings, she founded her own recording company, Caedmon (named after the medieval poet) in 1952, together with her college classmate Holdridge.

Caedmon became a successful venture because Mantell and Holdridge managed to convince leading writers and poets, beginning with Dylan Thomas, to record their works for them. It specialized in contemporary literature and poetry recordings, becoming the first major audiobook label and the period's only women-owned records company. Their first album, which sold 400,000 copies during the 1950s, was inducted into the National Recording Registry in 2008.

In the early 1970s, Mantell and Holdridge sold Caedmon to D.C. Heath (now part of HarperAudio). Mantell then started a documentary film distribution company together with her husband.

== Personal life and death ==
Marianne Roney married the PR executive and documentary filmmaker Harold Mantell in 1956. The couple had a daughter, Eva, and three sons, Stephen (died 2009), Michael, and David (died 2011).

Marianne Mantell died after a fall in Princeton, New Jersey on January 22, 2023, at the age of 93.
