= Exact Editions =

Online publisher

- Founder: Adam Hodgkin, Daryl Rayner, Tim Bruce
- Headquarters: London, United Kingdom
- Website: exacteditions.com

Exact Editions is an integrated content management platform for magazine and book publishers. It was launched in 2005 by Adam Hodgkin, Daryl Rayner and Tim Bruce. The platform expanded from a web-based subscription service into developing branded iOS apps for Apple’s Newsstand. These use the freemium model, offering subscriptions via an in-app purchase. They allow users to sync issues for offline use, share app content via social media and email, and bookmark pages to return to.

The platform offers subscriptions to individuals and to institutions, as well as several titles in French and Spanish.

In 2009, the company launched an Android app called ‘Exactly’, which offers access to all titles. In 2012, they began offering publishers the additional option to offer apps on the Kindle Fire through the Amazon Appstore.

In 2012, Exact Editions launched its first complete digital archive for Gramophone magazine, offering subscribers access to 90 years' worth of back issues (1,000 issues in total). Since then, Dazed & Confused's 20-year archive and The Wire's 30-year archive have also been released.

In 2021, Exact Editions also began offering the then 27-year archive of Magma, the London-based poetry magazine, dating back to 1994. They now also have those of other poetry journals, such as The Poetry Review and Modern Poetry in Translation.

Moving further, Exact Editions expanded its partnership with several companies and made way for collaboration with others, including Kelsey Media, New Welsh Review, a publication from 1840 (The Tablet), the Royal Society of Biology's The Biologist, the British Museum for a thirty-year archive of their membership magazine, Filmmaker, Autocar, Warners Group Publications' German military history title Iron Cross, The Times Literary Supplement, and Mousse, the contemporary art magazine. Overall, the titles span a variety of subjects (news, music, technology, sport) and varying frequencies of publication (weekly, monthly, quarterly).

With sustainability being an idea behind Exact Editions, they proposed to move beyond an online archive of magazines to house "environment-friendly" online collections to allow convenience for prize-program jurors. They materialised the same by showcasing the Independent Publishers Guild books for publishers at the 2023 London Book Fair.
