= Alexander S. Onassis Foundation =

Greek nonprofit philanthropic organization

Onassis Foundation
- Ίδρυμα Ωνάση

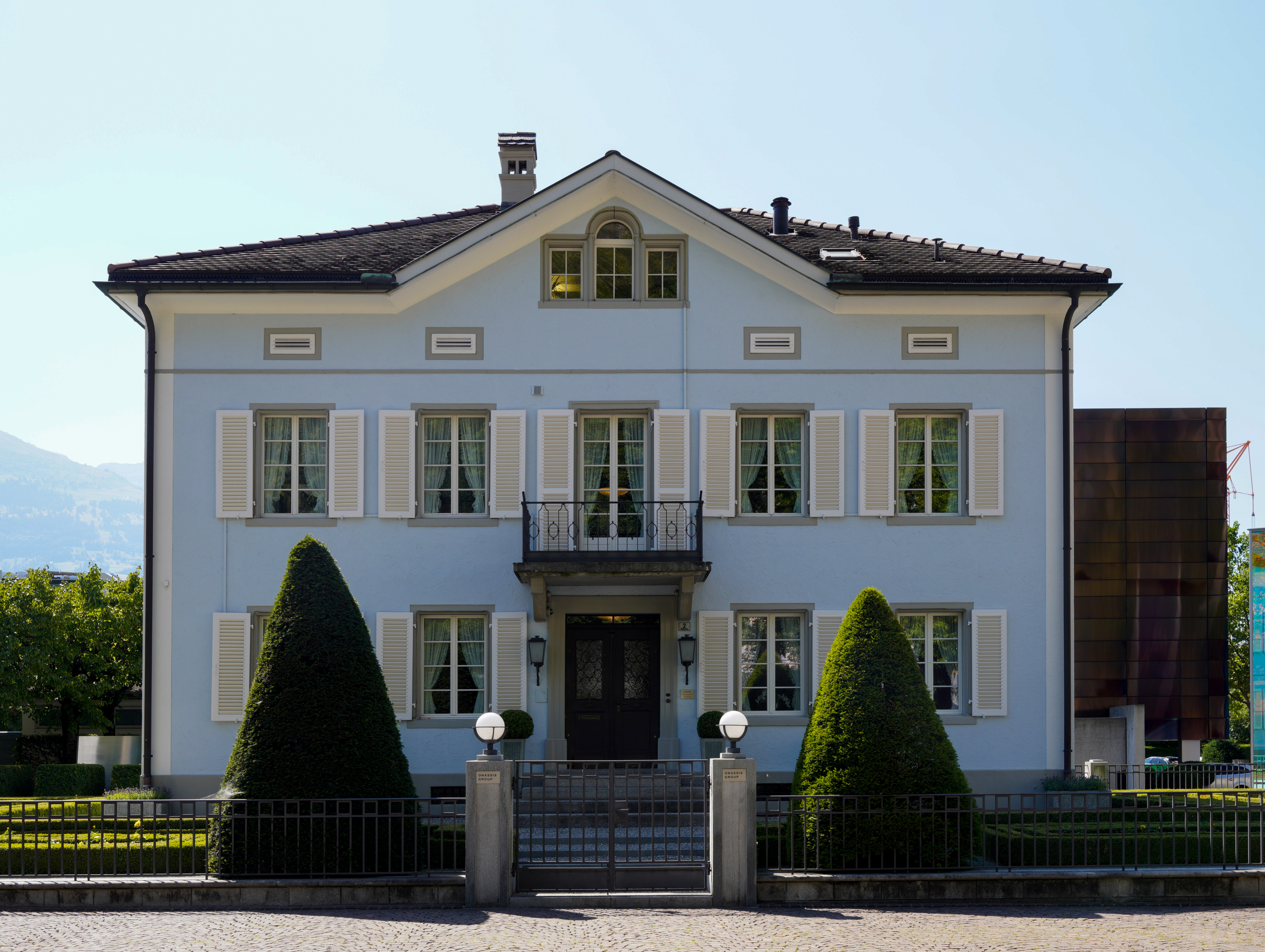
- Onassis house in Vaduz, Liechtenstein
- Formation: 1975; 51 years ago
- Founder: Aristotle Onassis
- Type: Private foundation
- Purpose: Philanthropy
- Headquarters: Vaduz, Liechtenstein
- Region served: International
- Secretary General: Anthony S. Papadimitriou
- Affiliations: Ministry of Education, Religious Affairs and Sports
- Website: https://www.onassis.org

The Alexander S. Onassis Foundation (Greek: Κοινωφελές Ίδρυμα Αλέξανδρος Σ. Ωνάσης), commonly known as Onassis Foundation (Greek: Ίδρυμα Ωνάση) is a private foundation headquartered in Vaduz, Liechtenstein. It was established by Aristotle Onassis in his will in Liechtenstein in order to honour the memory of his son Alexander, who died at age 24 in an airplane crash in Athens in 1973.

== History ==
Aristotle Onassis died in 1975, and had directed in his will that half of his estate should be transferred upon his death to a foundation to be established in his son's name. In 1975, the executors of the estate accordingly established a pair of foundations, incorporated in Vaduz, Liechtenstein: the Business Foundation, which acts as a holding company for the underlying business interests (notably in maritime transport and real estate), and the Alexander S. Onassis Public Benefit Foundation, which is the sole beneficiary of the Business Foundation.

The executors and original members of the Board of Directors, appointed in 1975 by Aristotle Onassis in his will, were his executives and business associates, including Nikos Kokkinis, Michael Dologlou, Stelios Papadimitriou, Paul Ioannidis, Apostolos Zambelas and Creon Brown. In time, other persons were added, such as Theodoros Gavriilidis.

The public benefit foundation is based in Vaduz. Aristotle's daughter, Christina Onassis, served as the first president of the foundation until her death in 1988. She was succeeded by Stelios Papadimitriou, Aristotle Onassis' lawyer, who died in 2005. Anthony S. Papadimitriou, the latter's son, serves as the current president and chair of the board of directors.

The foundation is one of the largest in Europe, using its assets to create scholarship and prize programs, build the $75 million Onassis Cardiac Surgery Center in Athens (designed by London-based hospital architect Llewelyn Davies), endow Greek studies chairs at universities, and support other projects. All activities of the Alexander S. Onassis Public Benefit Foundation, from the time of its establishment to the present, are funded exclusively by the profits of the Business Foundation, which engages mainly in shipping and real estate investments.

== Activities ==
=== Culture ===
The Foundation aims at promoting Greek culture and civilization throughout the world and in Greece. The first international affiliate Onassis Foundation, now known as OnassisUSA, was established in New York City to disseminate information about Hellenic civilization throughout North and South America.

The Onassis Stegi (former Onassis Cultural Center), Foundation's venue, was built in Athens in 2004 and opened in December 2010. Onassis Stegi's artistic programming addresses issues of democracy, social and environmental justice, racial and gender equality, and LGBTI+ rights.

Onassis AiR is an artistic research and residency program launched in 2019 and based in Athens. It is open to artists and researchers from around the world and promotes international collaboration. Artists and other participants create and interact on equal terms, without strict timelines, according to Onassis Foundation's philosophy that the conditions necessary for the creation must be ensured. Since 2019 the program has included over 200 members.

The Foundation's US presence (Onassis USA) is in the Olympic Tower on Fifth Avenue, which was built in 1976 and combines offices, shops and luxury apartments. It is also home to the Onassis Cultural Center, which has been open intermittently for exhibits and other programming, but as of 2018 is no longer regularly open to the public. From 2020 to 2022, the Onassis USA also maintained operations through its branch in Los Angeles (Onassis LA, aka OLA House) under Paul Holdengräber, mainly during COVID-19 pandemic.

The Foundation undertook the establishment of the Onassis Library for Hellenic and Roman Art at The Metropolitan Museum of Art in New York, the renovation and equipment of the libraries of the National Archaeological Museum, the Byzantine & Christian Museum and the Benaki Museum in Athens, the architectural preservation and restoration of sites and buildings around the world (such as C. P. Cavafy's House in Alexandria, Egypt), as well as other endeavors centered on arts and culture, including projects in the public space, like open-air exhibitions (at first in Athens and later in Ioannina), creation or restoration of cultural spaces and a series of large-scale artworks by Greek artists mainly in Athens Metropolitan Area. Also, in 2020 Onassis Foundation undertook the costs of the new lighting design and construction and also other works in the Acropolis archaeological site.

The Onassis Foundation opens Six Rings, a two-story concept store in Athens open to the public combining fashion, culture and emerging talents coexist with established names in contemporary design, including workshops and mentoring programs Artists-in-Residence.

Onassis AiR (Artists-in-Residence) is an international artistic research and residency program of the Onassis Foundation.

The Onassis Foundation opens the Onassis Ready, a multipurpose venue and creative hub open for hire for creation, rehearsals, and other artistic or professional activities.

=== Health ===
In the field of health, the Foundation donated the Onassis Cardiac Surgery Centre (OCSC) to the Greek state in 1992. Nearby, the Onassis National Transplant Centre (ONTC), funded by the Foundation, was also delivered to the Greek state in October 2025. Together with the Onassis Children's Unit, specializing in pediatric cardiology, cardiac surgery and pediatric transplantation, they form the new unified and fully digitized Onassis Hospital.

In 2018, Onassis Foundation reconstructed the Melanoma and Skin Cancer Center at the Andreas Syngros Hospital in Athens. Moreover, the Foundation provided financial support to organisations such as ELPIDA and the Hellenic Society for the Protection and Rehabilitation of Disabled Children (ELEPAP). In 2020, it implemented donations related to the response to the COVID-19 pandemic in Greece.

=== Education ===
In 1978, the Onassis Foundation launched scholarships for studies in Greece and abroad. Nowadays emphasis is given on fields such as robotics, artificial intelligence, biotechnology, and bio-innovation. The same year (1978) the Foundation established international awards, which were handed out to individuals and organizations in the fields of culture, social achievement and the environment. Since 2008 the awards were redesigned and expanded as the Onassis International Prize for Shipping, Trade, and Finance in partnership with Bayes Business School, University of London, and the City of London.

Since 2010, the Onassis Foundation has implemented a series of educational programs for children, adolescents, schools, adults, and teachers, including creative music courses, digital applications, seminars, mixed dance lessons for people with and without disabilities etc. Moreover, the Foundation has been organizing nationwide workshops and various educational activities for children with either motor difficulties or autism spectrum disorder (ASD). Also the Foundation supports educational institutions (like universities, colleges and schools) in about 40 countries.

Public Onassis Schools (junior and senior high schools) locate in areas facing social and economic challenges operate under the supervision and overseen of the Ministry of Education, in close collaboration with the Alexander S. Onassis Foundation through its donation starting totaling 160 million euros. The curriculum resembles that of Model Schools. Attendance is entirely free of charge. Students entering the first year of junior or senior high school will take written admission exams (tests) of knowledge and skills, similar to the process for Model Schools. At least 40-60% of the students attending the Public Onassis Schools will be from the municipal district in which the school is located. Teaching and administrative staff salaries will be covered by the Ministry of Education.

== See also ==
- Onassis Stegi
- Olympic Tower
- Onassio Cardiac Surgery Centre
- The Hellenic Library of the Onassis Foundation
