= George S. Livanos =

Greek shipowner

- Born: 1935 (age 90–91)
- Spouse: Lita Voivoda
- Children: 5
- Parents: Stavros Livanos (father); Arietta Zafirakis (mother)

George Stavros Livanos (Greek: Γέωργιος Σ. Λιβανός; born 1935) is a Greek ship-owner.

== Life ==
George S. Livanos is the son of the founder of the Livanos shipping empire Stavros Livanos and Arietta Zafirakis, the younger brother of Eugenia and Tina Livanos and a cousin of George P. Livanos. Eugenia married Stavros Niarchos, while Tina married both Aristotle Onassis and her sister's widower Niarchos.

The Livanos family, originating from Kardamyla in the Aegean island of Chios, after centuries of professional activity of its members as sailors and captains, first became ship-owners at the end of the 18th and the beginning of the 19th century, operating a fleet of sailing barques. The Massacre of Chios in 1822 caused the destruction of the family ship-owning business, which, however, was eventually revived in the course of the 19th century, with the purchase of the ship S/V Kaesar by Georgios M. Livanos in 1878.

George Livanos is the owner of a large fleet of ships, which he manages mainly through Sun Enterprises (focusing on tankers), S. Livanos Hellas and Alios Bulkers (focusing on bulk carriers). Several of his ships fly the Greek flag, while others sail under flags of convenience. His companies employ many Greek captains and sailors, especially from Chios, and he has made many donations to the island of Chios and to Greek seafarers' families.

Like his father Stavros, George Livanos traditionally maintained excellent relations with the governments and major petroleum companies of the Western world and especially the United States, which chartered his tankers, but also with governments of Communist countries such as the Soviet Union and China, which also often entered into agreements with him to transport cargo with his merchant fleet.

Livanos played a very important role in the 1970s in the economic development of South Korea and in particular the Hyundai shipyards, which became the largest in the world. Livanos came to an agreement with the then South Korean President, General Park Chung-hee (head of a military junta) to order ships to the Hyundai Heavy Industries before the shipyards were even completed. Livanos had appreciated the meticulous presentation made to him by the South Korean President, and the fact that the head of the Hyundai Group was closely linked to the South Korean government, so he would have full government support. When he placed the order, Livanos made an advance payment of 140 million krw. This advance payment was then used as proof of the actual order required to start financing the shipyards by a consortium of international banks.

Unlike his cousin George P. Livanos, who was a very active member of the Greek lobby in Washington and a regular interlocutor and associate of Greek Prime Minister Andreas Papandreou, George S. Livanos never developed a public presence. However, in the 1980s, in response to a call from Andreas Papandreou, he agreed to fly the Greek flag on several of his ships, instead of flags of convenience. He also had a close friendship with the former King of Greece, Constantine II.

He is the owner of a private Aegean island, Koronida, in the Argolic Gulf.

From his marriage to Lita Voivoda he had five children (Arietta, Marina, Eugenia, Stavros, Christina) and many grandchildren. His son Stavros has taken over the management of shipping companies.
