= Niarchos =

Niarchos may refer to:

- Philip Niarchos (born 1954), eldest son of the Greek shipping magnate Stavros Niarchos
- Spyros Niarchos (born 1955), second son of the Greek shipping magnate Stavros Niarchos
- Stavros Niarchos (1909–1996), Greek shipping tycoon
- Stavros Niarchos Foundation, established in 1996 to honor Greek shipping magnate Stavros Niarchos
- Stavros S Niarchos, a British brig-rigged tall ship owned and operated by the Tall Ships Youth Trust
- Victoria Niarchos (born 1960), member of the non-aristocratic branch of the Guinness beer clan
- Niarchos (spider), a genus of goblin spiders
