= Onassis =

Onassis may refer to:

== People with the name ==
- Aristotle Onassis (1906–1975), a Greek shipping magnate
  - Alexander Onassis (1948–1973), son of Aristotle Onassis
  - Christina Onassis (1950–1988), a Greek shipping magnate and daughter of Aristotle Onassis
    - Athina Onassis Roussel (born 1985), daughter of Christina Onassis
- Erick Onasis (born 1968), an American rapper also known as Erick Sermon
- Jacqueline Kennedy Onassis (1929–1994), the wife of U.S. President John F. Kennedy (later the wife of Aristotle Onassis)

== Other uses ==
- Onassis glasses, a style of oversized sunglasses popularized by Jacqueline Onassis
