= Château de la Croë =

Building in Antibes, France

Coordinates: 43.54605°N 7.13413°E

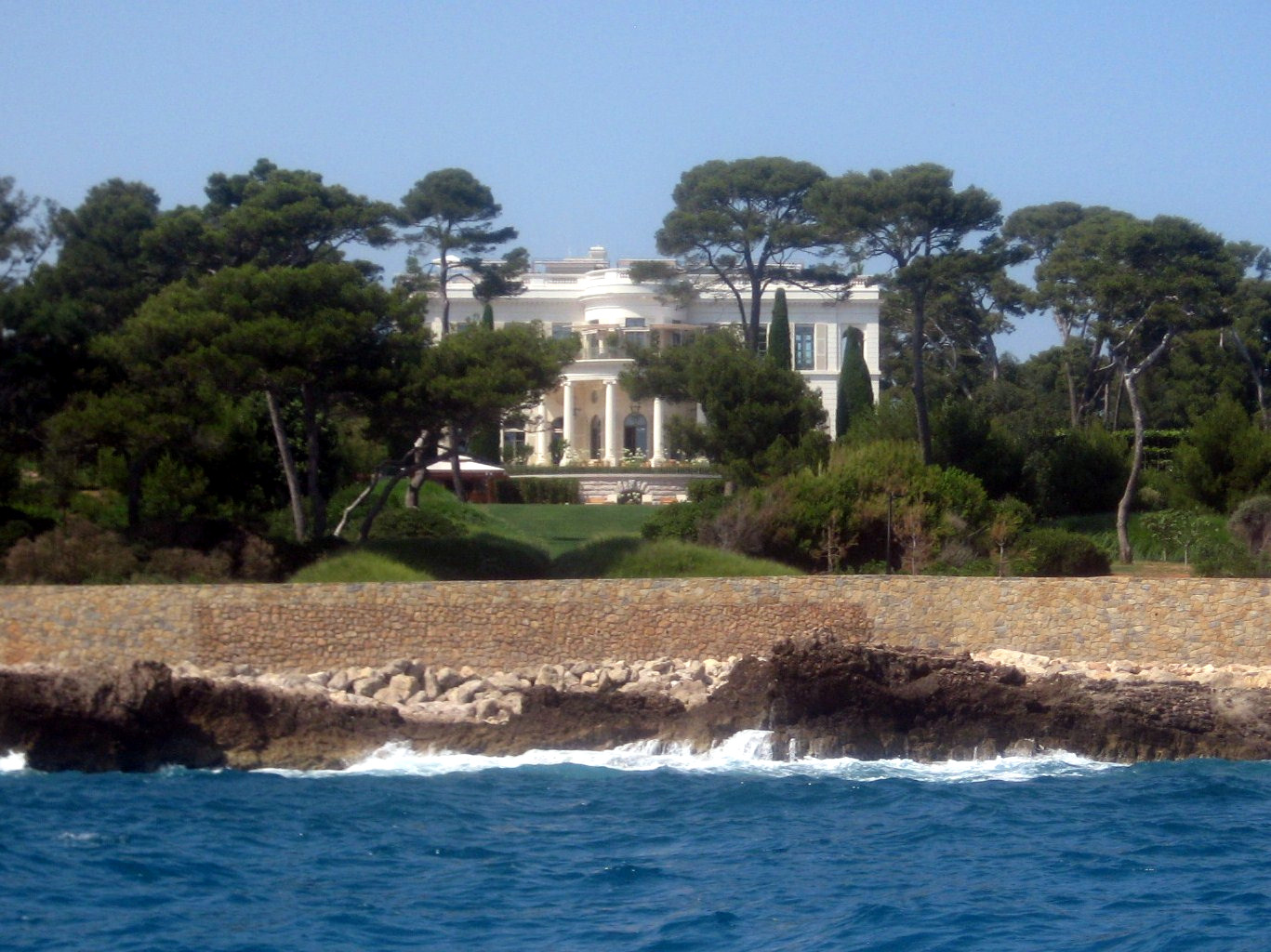
The Château de la Croë in 2011

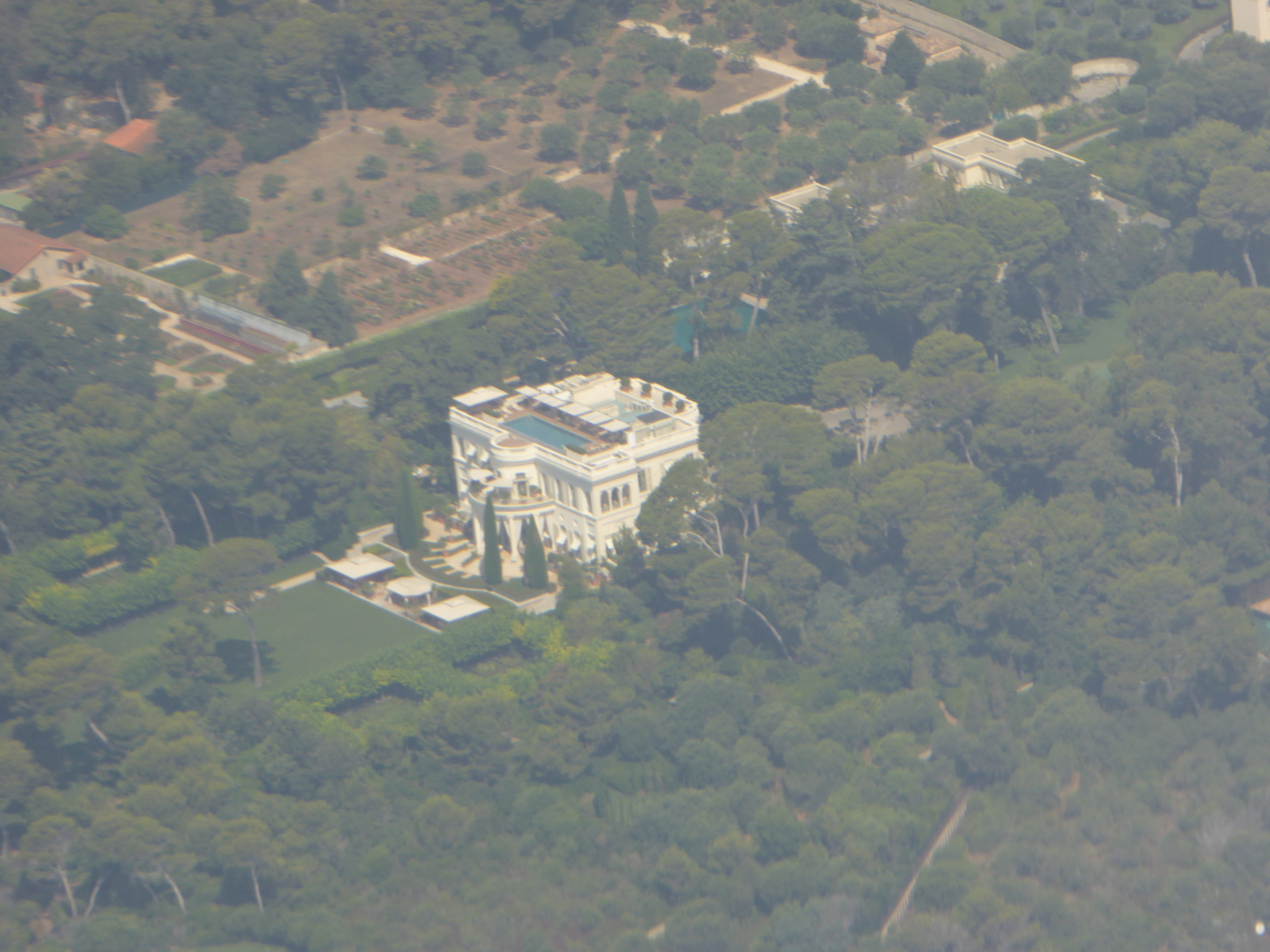
Overview of the villa and grounds

The Château de la Croë (French pronunciation: [ʃato d(ə) la kʁɔɛ]) is a large detached villa situated in eight hectares of grounds on the Cap d'Antibes peninsula of the French Riviera (Côte d'Azur), in the Alpes-Maritimes department of Southern France.

The classical-style château was designed by architect Armand-Albert Rateau and built in 1927 for Sir Pomeroy Burton, general manager of Associated Newspapers.

== Ownership ==
The Duke and Duchess of Windsor leased the château in May 1938, in addition to their Parisian mansion, after the Duke's abdication as King Edward VIII in 1936. When the Germans invaded France they departed for Spain on 19 June 1940.

The Windsors returned in 1946 to find that it had been used during the war as a billet for Italian and German troops. The building was in a poor state and there was abandoned military equipment on the building and in the garden. The Duchess of Windsor subsequently renovated the house, leading the author Rebecca West to comment that "There are not many women who can pick up the keys to a rented house, raddled by long submission to temporary inmates, and make it look as if a family of cheerful good taste had been living there for two or three centuries."

Winston and Clementine Churchill celebrated their fortieth wedding anniversary with the Windsors at the château in 1948.

Among the Windsors' guests were Deborah, Duchess of Devonshire and her husband, the 11th Duke of Devonshire. Deborah Devonshire later recalled that the Duke of Windsor wore full Highland dress at dinner, with a kilt and a dirk, and a Highland piper entertained the dinner guests, which Devonshire thought was "more suited to the misty glens than the Côte d'Azur in July." The Windsors' housekeeper later worked at Chatsworth House, home of the Devonshires. The housekeeper told Deborah Devonshire that all the staff employed at the Château de la Croë by the Windsors were blonde haired, however, in Edward Wessex’s 2015 documentary, “Whatever happened to the Windsors?”, there is film footage of staff with dark hair and dark skin filmed at the Château.

The Windsors left when their lease expired in the spring of 1949.

The Greek shipping magnate Aristotle Onassis owned the château from 1950 to 1957, selling it after his wife, Athina Livanos, found him in bed with her friend, the socialite Jeanne Rhinelander. The house was then acquired by Onassis's brother-in-law and business rival, Stavros Niarchos, who bought it for his wife, Eugenia Livanos, Athina's sister.

=== 21st century ===
The Château de la Croë has been owned by Russian businessman Roman Abramovich since 2001. Abramovich is believed to have spent £30 million restoring the château. In 2010, a lecture was given and a short film was shown at the house about Abramovich's restoration of the Château de la Croë. Before its restoration, the château had been damaged and occupied by squatters, with only the structure still intact. The permit for the renovation was granted in February 2004, and work took four years to complete. The work was completed two months ahead of the deadline, with all of the furniture and fittings individually made and designed for the house.

As part of the work, an approximately 15 metre-long swimming pool was built on the roof of the building, and a gym and cinema were installed in the basement. The grounds were landscaped by Peter Wirtz, the son of noted Belgian landscape designer Jacques Wirtz, and planted with Californian and Mediterranean species.

==== Château seized ====
As of April 2022, due to the ongoing invasion of Ukraine the château has been seized by the French government because of sanctions against Russian oligarchs.
