= Stavros G. Livanos =

Greek businessman

Stavros George Livanos (Greek: Σταύρος Λιβανός; 1887 or 1890 – May 28, 1963), was a Greek shipowner, native of the northern Aegean Sea island of Chios, and the founder of the Livanos shipping empire. He was also a rival as well as father-in-law to billionaire Greek shipping tycoons Aristotle Onassis and Stavros Niarchos.

== Early life ==
The Livanos family, originating from Kardamyla in the Aegean island of Chios, after centuries of professional activity of its members as sailors and captains, first became ship-owners at the end of the 18th and the beginning of the 19th century, operating a fleet of sailing barques. The Massacre of Chios in 1822 caused the destruction of the family ship-owning business, which, however, was eventually revived in the course of the 19th century, with the purchase of the ship S/V Kaesar by Georgios M. Livanos in 1878.

Stavros Livanos was born in Chios, then part of the Ottoman Empire, in 1887. The third of four sons of steamship owner George Livanos, he turned the outbreak of the First World War into opportunities. Even during the postwar demise of the shipping boom, Livanos managed to stay on top by investing only with cash instead of credit. He was notoriously tight with his money, a claim that the late Stavros Niarchos remembered as accurate. Confirming his reputation for high cash-investment in his ships, Livanos once said, "I have no money. I have ships."

== Marriage and descendants ==
- In 1924, he married Arietta Zafirakis (1909–1986) and had three children.
  - Eugenia Livanos (1927-1970), married Stavros Niarchos in 1947.
    - Philip Niarchos (born 1954), billionaire art collector. Married Victoria Christina Guinness.
      - Stavros Niarchos III (born 1985). In 2019, he married Dasha Zhukova, in a civil ceremony in Paris.
        - Philip Stavros Niarchos (born 2021)
        - Victoria Niarchos (born 2023)
        - Alexander Niarchos (born 2024)
      - Eugenie Niarchos (born 1986), a jewellery designer.
      - Theodorakis Niarchos (born 1991)
      - Electra Niarchos (born 1995)
    - Spyros Stavros Niarchos (born 1955). He was married to Daphne Guinness.
      - Nicolas Stavros Niarchos (born 1989)
      - Alexis Spyros Niarchos (born 1991)
      - Ines Sophia Niarchos (born 1995)
    - Maria Isabella Niarchos (born 1959). Married firstly Alix Chevassus, and then Stephane Gouazé.
      - Artur Gouazé
      - Maia Gouazé
    - Constantin Niarchos (1962-1999). Married firstly Alessandra Borghese, of the Borghese family and then Sylvia Martins.
  - Athina Mary Livanos (1929–1974), married firstly Aristotle Onassis, secondly John Spencer-Churchill, 11th Duke of Marlborough and thirdly Stavros Niarchos (her former brother in law).
    - Alexander Onassis (1948-1973). Died in a plane crash.
    - Christina Onassis (1950-1988). Married firstly Joseph Bolker, secondly Alexandros Andreadis, thirdly Sergei Kauzov and finally Thierry Roussel.
      - Athina Onassis (born 1985), married Álvaro de Miranda Neto.
  - George S. Livanos (born 1935), married Lita Voivoda in 1966, in London.
    - Marina Livanos, married Andreas Martinos, heir to the ship management company Thenamaris.
      - Andreas-Ioannis Martinos
    - Stavros Livanos.
    - Arietta Livanos, married Giorgios Vardinoyannis.
    - Eugenie Livanos, married Nicholas Clive-Worms, heir to the Banque Worms fortune.
    - Christina Livanos

The Livanos family lived in London most of the time. It was in London during the First World War that Livanos built the foundation of his empire. Yet they also had a lavish villa, known as Bella Vista, on Chios.
