= Alexander Onassis =

Greek businessman and heir (1948–1973)

- Born: April 30, 1948; New York City, U.S.
- Died: January 23, 1973 (aged 24); Athens, Kingdom of Greece
- Cause of death: Injuries sustained in a plane crash
- Resting place: Skorpios, Ionian Islands, Greece
- Occupations: Businessman; President of Olympic Aviation
- Parents: Aristotle Onassis (father); Athina Livanos (mother)
- Relatives: Christina Onassis (sister); Athina Onassis (niece); Jacqueline Kennedy Onassis (stepmother)

Alexander Socrates Onassis (Greek: Αλέξανδρος Σωκράτης Ωνάσης; April 30, 1948 – January 23, 1973) was an American-born Greek businessman. He was the son of the Greek shipping magnate Aristotle Onassis and his first wife Tina Livanos. He and his sister Christina Onassis were upset by his father's marriage to Jacqueline Kennedy, and he was credited with attempting to improve the relationship between his father and his brother-in-law and business rival Stavros Niarchos, who in 1971 married Alexander's mother after her divorce from Aristotle Onassis.

Born in New York City, Onassis was not formally educated and worked for several years for his father at his headquarters in Monaco. The relationship between Onassis and his father experienced tensions as a result of Alexander's secret relationship with British model Fiona Campbell-Walter, former wife of Hans Heinrich, Baron Thyssen-Bornemisza de Kászon. He was later appointed the head of Olympic Aviation, a Greek regional airline owned by his father. Onassis died in hospital as a result of injuries sustained in an air crash at Hellinikon International Airport at the age of 24. The Alexander S. Onassis Foundation was established in his memory.

== Early life ==
Alexander Socrates Onassis was born on April 30, 1948, at the Columbia University Medical Center in Washington Heights, Manhattan in New York City. He was the elder child of the Greek shipping magnate Aristotle Onassis (1906 –1975) and his first wife, Athina Livanos (1929 –1974), herself a daughter of the Greek shipping magnate Stavros G. Livanos. Alexander was named after his father's uncle, who was hanged by a Turkish military tribunal during the burning of Smyrna in September 1922. Alexander's sister, Christina, was born in 1950.

Alexander had no formal schooling, but had been provided with a personal tutor and his own apartment from a young age. Alexander failed his exams at a Paris lycée at age 16, and began working for his father at his Monaco headquarters in 1965. Alexander earned a salary of $12,000 working for his father despite his father's great wealth. Alexander was not an enthusiastic employee. A fellow employee said that he seemed in no "great hurry to prove himself an Onassis." Onassis also described himself as never having spent a day not "intimidated by the old man's wealth." In the mid-1960s, Onassis began a relationship with the French model Odile Rodin, a woman several years his senior. Rodin was the widow of the Dominican playboy and diplomat Porfirio Rubirosa, and Rodin and Onassis lived together in Monaco.

== Family tensions ==
In October 1968, Aristotle Onassis married Jacqueline Kennedy, the widow of John F. Kennedy, the 35th President of the United States. Alexander and his sister Christina were greatly upset by the union. They had hoped that he might remarry their mother, which had seemed possible towards the end of their father's relationship with the Greek opera singer Maria Callas. Alexander said: "My father loved the names and Jackie loved the money." Despite never liking their stepmother, Alexander and his sister were friendly with her children, Caroline and John, and Alexander would occasionally let his stepbrother ride at the controls of his plane. Aristotle Onassis's friend, John W. Meyer, credited Alexander with persuading his father to stop publicly accusing his business rival and former brother-in-law, Stavros Niarchos, of involvement in the death of Niarchos's former wife, Alexander's aunt Eugenia Livano-Niarchos. Niarchos later married Alexander's mother, the sister of his former wife.

== Romantic relationships ==
Aristotle's second marriage exacerbated the tensions already inherent in his relationship with his son. He also disapproved of Alexander's secret relationship with Fiona von Thyssen (née Campbell Walter), a British fashion model some 16 years his senior and the former wife of industrialist Baron Hans Heinrich Thyssen-Bornemisza. Alexander had first met Thyssen when he was 12, and as an 18-year-old had surprised his mother by inviting her to a dinner party, as she was one of his mother's friends.

Following the dinner party, Alexander and Thyssen went to a disco, where she punched a fellow dancer in the face (who then fell to the floor) after he suggested that she was only with Alexander because of his father's wealth. Alexander wanted to have a committed relationship with Thyssen from their first meeting, which she initially resisted, but the deep relationship which eventually developed between the pair was resisted by Alexander's mother, who constantly sought to sabotage it. Alexander's father also sought to undermine his son's relationship by buying him a $2 million villa outside Athens, a gesture that Thyssen felt was an attempt to mold her into just another "Alexander object ... to be manipulated, brutalised and treated on any level and on any terms he chooses." Thyssen only accepted gifts from Alexander if they were paid from the money he had earned from working.

== Death ==
Alexander had taken his first flying lesson in 1967 and had accrued 1,500 flying hours by the time of his death. Possessing a professional pilot's license, he was appointed the President of Olympic Aviation, a regional Greek subsidiary of his father's Olympic Airways, in 1971. Onassis' poor eyesight meant that he could not hold an air transport certificate, but could possess a commercial pilot certificate, allowing him to fly light planes and air taxis for emergency medical cases.

Alexander died on January 23, 1973, at the age of 24 from injuries sustained the previous day when his personal Piaggio P.136L-2 amphibious airplane, in which he was a passenger, crashed at Hellinikon International Airport in Athens. Alexander was instructing a potential new pilot of the plane, Donald McCusker, at the time of the crash, in his role as President of Olympic Aviation. Alexander and McCusker were accompanied by Donald McGregor, Onassis's regular pilot, who was recovering from an eye infection. A few seconds after takeoff from runway 33, the plane's right wing dropped and stayed down, and the plane crashed shortly after losing control in a flight lasting no more than 15 seconds. McCusker and the other pilot both suffered serious injuries in the crash. The trio had planned to practice amphibious landings between the Saronic Gulf islands of Aegina and Poros after takeoff.

The day after the crash, Alexander's father and stepmother arrived from New York at the hospital where Alexander was being treated. The couple were accompanied by an American neurosurgeon. Alexander's mother arrived from Switzerland with her husband, Stavros Niarchos. Aristotle had also flown the renowned English neurosurgeon Alan Richardson from London to Athens, but Richardson later told Onassis that Alexander had no chance of surviving his injuries. Aristotle Onassis considered having his son's body cryogenically frozen with the Life Extension Society, but was persuaded against it, and he was embalmed by Desmond Henley. Alexander Onassis was buried next to the chapel on his father's private Ionian island of Skorpios.

Reports into the crash by the Greek Air Force and an independent investigator hired by Onassis, the Englishman Alan Hunter, concluded that it had occurred as a result of the reversing of the aileron connecting cables during the installation of a new control column. This conclusion was disputed by McGregor, who believed that the wake turbulence from an Air France Boeing 727 that had taken off before them had caused the crash.

Less than a month after Alexander's death, McCusker had manslaughter proceedings initiated against him by the public prosecutor of Athens in connection with the crash. Six people were also charged over Onassis's death in January 1974, with their indictment indicating that faulty controls had been fitted to his plane.

In December 1974, in a paid advertisement, Aristotle Onassis announced his offering of a $1,000,000 reward (equivalent to $6.528 million in 2025) for proof that his son's death had been as a result of "deliberate action" as opposed to the cause of negligence, the conclusion reached by the official inquiry. All charges relating to the crash were later dropped, and McCusker was awarded $800,000 in 1978 by Olympic Airways, three years after Aristotle Onassis's death. Onassis had refused to believe that his son's death was an accident, believing it was due to the machinations of the United States Central Intelligence Agency (CIA) and the leader of the Greek military junta, Georgios Papadopoulos.

Alexander's death had a profound effect on his father, who never fully recovered from the loss of his son. Aristotle Onassis sought to sell Olympic Airways after his son's death, and died two years later in March 1975. Onassis was buried alongside his son on Skorpios.

== Alexander S. Onassis Foundation ==
Aristotle Onassis's will established a charitable foundation in memory of his son, the Alexander S. Onassis Public Benefit Foundation, based in the tax haven of Vaduz in Liechtenstein, and headquartered in Athens. The foundation received 45% of his fortune, with the remainder left to Alexander's sister, Christina. The foundation consists of two parts; a business foundation which runs various businesses including shipping, and a public benefit foundation which is the sole recipient of the business foundation. The public benefit foundation funds the worldwide promotion of Greek culture, funds the Onassis International Prizes for achievement in various fields, and the funding of scholarships for Greek university students.
