= Elena Ford =

American businesswoman

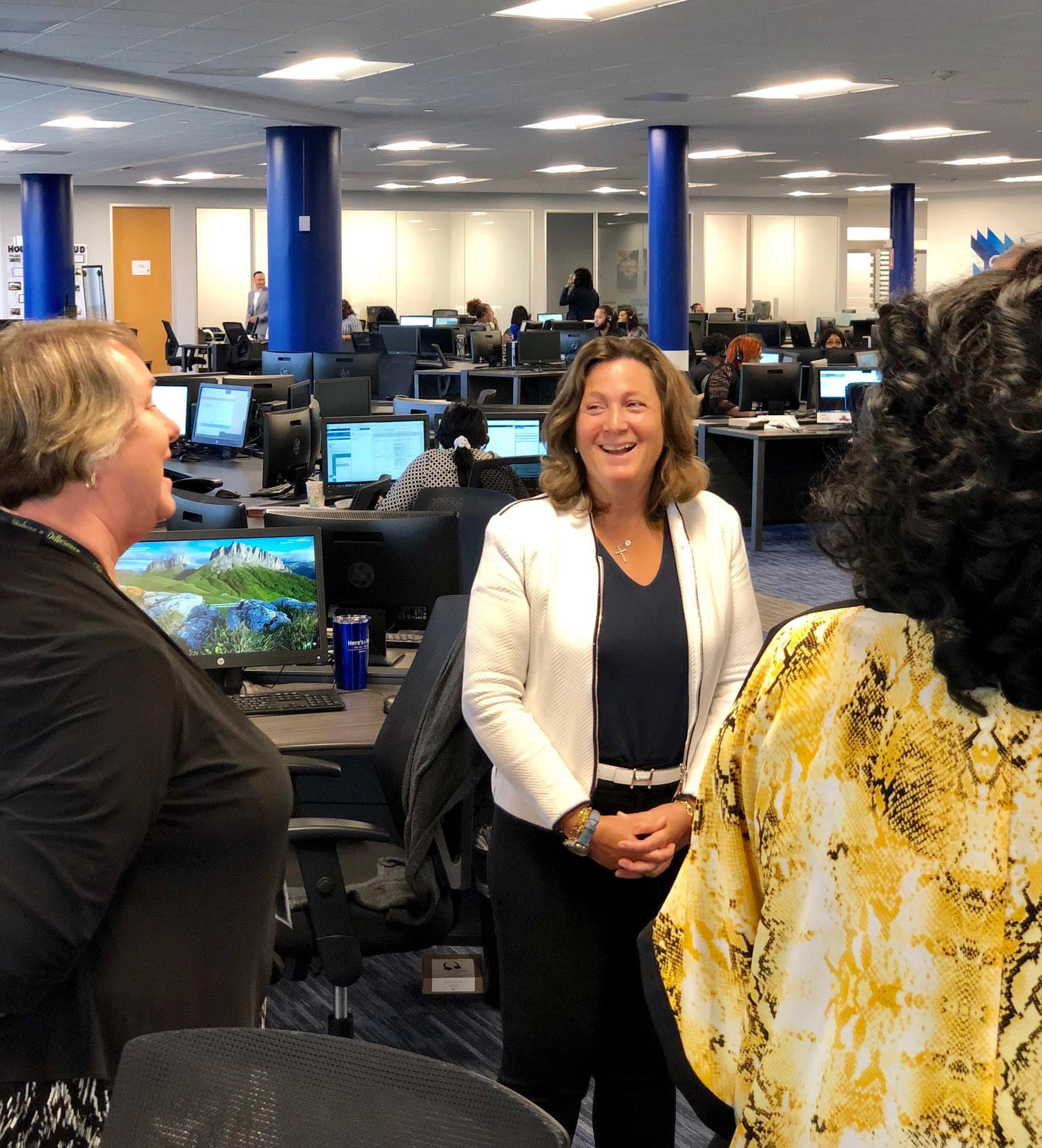
- Elena Ford at the Houston Call Center
- Born: Elena Anne Ford-Niarchos; May 25, 1966 (age 60); New York City, New York, U.S.
- Other name: Elena Ford-Niarchos
- Education: New York University
- Occupations: Chief Customer Experience Officer, Ford Motor Company
- Spouses: Stanley Jozef Olender (m. 1991; div. 1996); Joseph Daniel Rippolone (m. 1996; div. 2008); Mitchell Seldin (m. 2022)
- Children: 4
- Parents: Stavros Spyros Niarchos (father); Charlotte McDonnell Ford (mother)
- Relatives: Henry Ford II (grandfather); Philip Niarchos (half-brother); Spyros Niarchos (half-brother)
- Family: Ford

Elena Anne Ford-Niarchos (born May 25, 1966) is an American businesswoman. She is the Chief Customer Experience Officer at Ford Motor Company and the first woman in the Ford family to hold an executive position at the company.

== Early life and education ==
Ford was born May 25, 1966, in New York City, the only child of Charlotte McDonnell Ford (1941–2025), an heiress and socialite, and Stavros Niarchos, a Greek shipping magnate. Her parents were briefly married and ultimately divorced in 1967. Her mother married J. Anthony Forstmann in 1973 and later Edward Downe Jr., the founder and chairman of Downe Communications in 1986.

Elena is the great-great-granddaughter of company founder Henry Ford I, and granddaughter of longtime Ford Motor Company president Henry Ford II. Elena was close to her maternal grandfather, Henry Ford II, once referring to him as her best friend. Henry taught Elena to drive a stick shift in his F-100 Ford pick-up truck, insisting she learned to drive a manual and not an automatic.

Ford received a bachelor's degree in business from New York University.

== Career ==
Ford worked in advertising as a senior account executive at Wells, Rich Greene Advertising in New York City. In 1995, she joined Ford Motor Company as a marketing executive. She was later named the company's director of global marketing and was responsible for marketing, product management, and sales support activities. During this time, she marketed the company's development into mobility services.

In 2012, Elena was assigned to lead the global Dealer and Consumer Experience group. She was responsible for standardizing the way dealerships interact with customers around the world and oversaw global dealer strategy, planning, training and consumer experience.

In 2013, Elena became vice president, Customer Experience and Global Dealer, making her one of thirty-eight officers running the company and the first female Ford family member to hold an executive leadership position.

In October 2018, Elena Ford was announced as the company's first Chief Customer Experience Officer. In this role, she led the organization in improving customer experience for all Ford customers.

In 2019, she spearheaded the launch of a 500-person call center in Houston, Texas, providing support for Ford truck owners and dealers experiencing technical issues. She also launched Ford's “Own the Call” initiative.

== Personal life ==
In 1991, Ford married firstly to Stanley Jozef Olender (1959–2016), son of Jozef Olender and Zofia Olender (née Kozak), both Polish immigrants. He was the former owner of Stanley O's, a landscape and estate maintenance service, in Southampton, New York. They had one daughter:

- Charlotte Ford (later Ford-Parent)

On June 2, 1996, Ford married Joseph Daniel Rippolone, son of Robert William Rippolone (1927–2005) and Angela Rippolone (née Rizzo), both of Mastic Beach, New York and St. Petersburg, Florida. At the time of the marriage he was a plumber and mechanic who designed septic systems in Detroit. They had three children:

- Claire Ford-Rippolone
- Alessandro Ford-Rippolone
- Annabelle Ford-Rippolone

In 2008, Ford and Rippolone divorced by mutual agreement. Elena Ford married Mitchell Seldin on July 30, 2022.

== See also ==
- Ford family (Michigan)
