= Philip Niarchos =

Greek businessman (born 1954)

- Born: Φίλιππος Νιάρχος; 1952 (age 73–74); Athens, Greece
- Education: Collège Stanislas de Paris
- Known for: Co-president of Stavros Niarchos Foundation
- Spouse: Victoria Guinness (m. 1984, divorced)
- Children: 4
- Parent(s): Stavros Niarchos; Eugenia Livanos
- Relatives: Spyros Niarchos (brother); Elena Ford (half-sister); Dasha Zhukova (daughter-in-law)

Philip Niarchos (alternately: Phílippos or Philippe; Greek: Φίλιππος Νιάρχος) (born 1952) is a Greek billionaire, the eldest son of the Greek shipping magnate Stavros Niarchos and Eugenia Livanos, herself the elder daughter of Stavros Niarchos' business rival Stavros G. Livanos, the founder of the Livanos shipping empire.

== Inheritance and work ==
In 2008, Philip Niarchos was reported to be 54 years old when The Sunday Times estimated his net worth at GBP 850 million, approximately $1.687 billion US at the exchange rate of that time. He is a member of the board of trustees at the Museum of Modern Art in New York City and an international council member of London's Tate Gallery. He was educated at the Collège Stanislas de Paris and Institut Le Rosey in Switzerland.

Together with his younger brother, Spyros, Niarchos serves as co-president and member of the board of directors at the Stavros Niarchos Foundation. The foundation, one of the world's largest global private philanthropies, was established over 25 years ago and has awarded a total of $3.3 billion across 5,000 grants, focusing on global funding for physical and mental health. In 2022, the foundation announced a $15 million commitment for a youth mental health program in Greece collaborating with The Child Mind institute and The Greek Ministry of Health.

== Art collector ==
Niarchos owns his late father's art collection. The late Stavros Niarchos amassed one of the "most important collections of Impressionist and modern art in private hands." Among the collection's trophies are Pablo Picasso's self-portrait Yo, Picasso, which the father had bought in 1989 for $47,850,000.

Niarchos has made numerous additions to his father's art collection. He was suspected as being the anonymous buyer of Vincent van Gogh's "Self-Portrait", at a November 1998 Christie's auction; it sold for $71.5 million. He was revealed to be the anonymous buyer of Jean-Michel Basquiat's 1982 Self-Portrait, which closed at $3.3 million. In 1994, he purchased Andy Warhol's Red Marilyn, at Christie's for $3.63 million. Warhol's skull portraits are from Niarchos' CAT scan. Warhol completed these works in 1985, using silkscreens made from CAT-scan films of the skull of Philip Niarchos, who commissioned the artist to paint his portrait. Niarchos is mentioned throughout The Andy Warhol Diaries. Warhol shares details of the dysfunctional relationship Niarchos had with the divorced and widowed socialite Barbara (née Tanner) de Kwiatkowski. Her married name was Barbara Allen at the time of her relationship with Niarchos; now she is the widow of Henryk de Kwiatkowski.

== Marriage and family ==
In 1984, Niarchos married, for the third time, Victoria Christina Guinness (born 1960), daughter of Patrick Benjamin Guinness (of the banking branch of the Guinness family) and Dolores Guinness (1936–2012). Niarchos and Guinness have two sons and two daughters:

- Stavros Niarchos III (born 1985). (Note: Featured in The Fabulous Life of...) In October 2019, he married Dasha Zhukova in a civil ceremony in Paris.
- Eugenie Niarchos (born 1986), socialite and jewelry designer.
- Theodorakis 'Theo' Niarchos (born 1991). Since July 2018, he is in a relationship with Camille Rowe.
- Electra Niarchos (born 1995)

Niarchos was a first cousin, and step-brother, of the late heiress Christina Onassis whose mother Athina Livanos (1929–1974) was a younger sister of his own mother and later became his father's last wife. Niarchos is a first cousin once removed of Athina Onassis.
