= Christina Onassis =

Greek businesswoman, socialite, and heiress to the Onassis fortune (1950–1988)

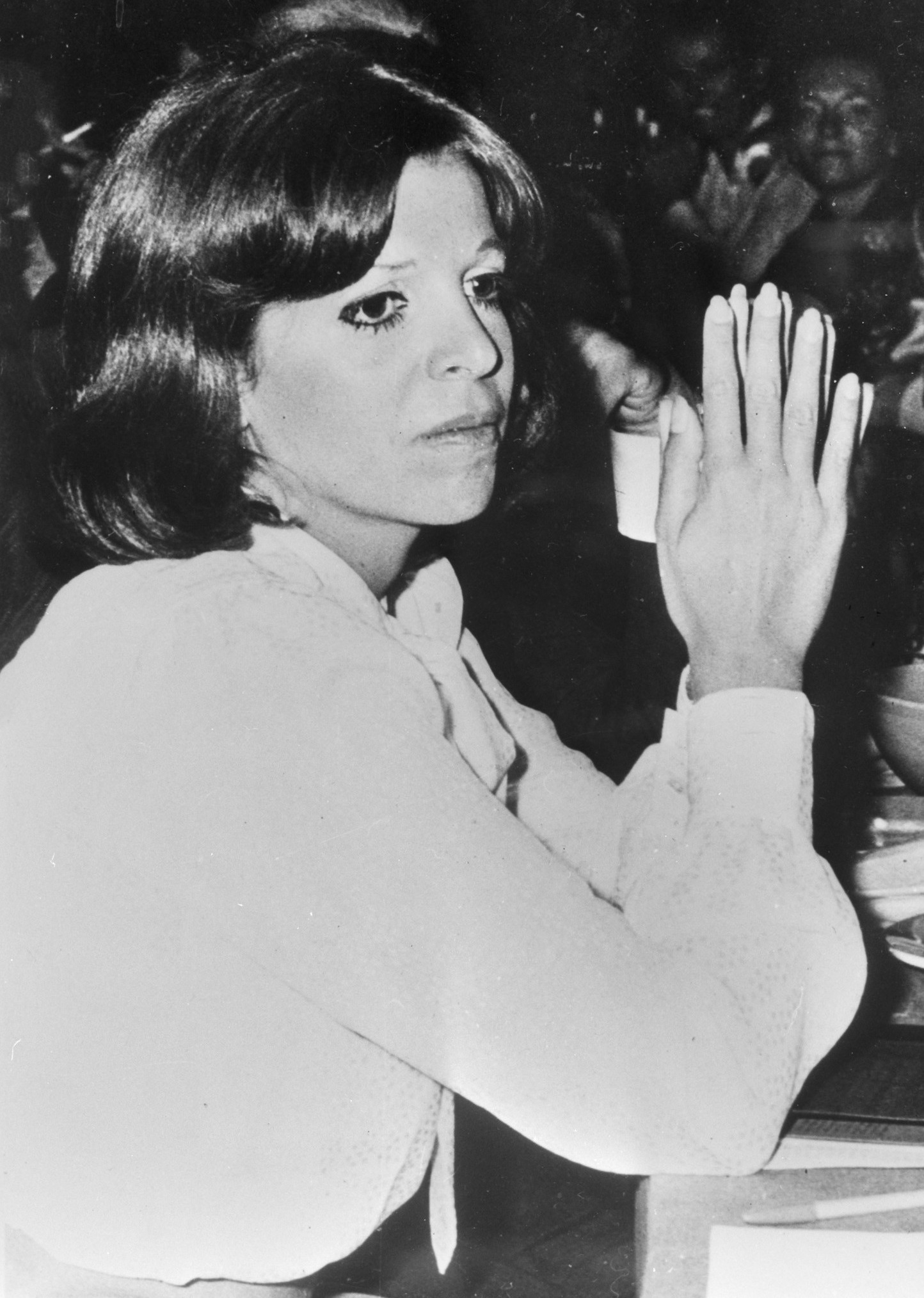
- Christina Onassis in 1978
- Born: 11 December 1950; Manhattan, New York, U.S.
- Died: 19 November 1988 (aged 37); Tortuguitas, Argentina
- Resting place: Island of Skorpios Cemetery
- Citizenship: Greece; Argentina
- Education: Queen's College, London
- Occupations: Shipping magnate, socialite, heiress
- Spouses: Joseph Bolker (m. 1971; div. 1972) Alexandros Andreadis (m. 1975; div. 1977) Sergei Kauzov (m. 1978; div. 1980) Thierry Roussel (m. 1984; div. 1987)
- Children: Athina Onassis
- Parent(s): Aristotle Onassis; Tina Onassis Niarchos
- Relatives: Alexander Onassis (brother)

Christina Onassis (Greek: Χριστίνα Ωνάση; 11 December 1950 – 19 November 1988) was a Greek-Argentine businesswoman, socialite and heiress to the Onassis fortune. She was the only daughter of Aristotle Onassis and Athina Mary "Tina" Livanos.

== Early life and family ==
Christina Onassis, the only daughter of the Greek shipping magnate Aristotle Onassis and his first wife, Tina Onassis Niarchos, was born in Lenox Hill, Manhattan at the LeRoy Sanitarium. Her maternal grandfather was Stavros G. Livanos, founder of the Livanos shipping empire. Onassis had an older brother, Alexander. She and Alexander were raised and educated in France, Greece, and England. She attended the Headington School in Oxford and Queen's College, London from 1968 to 1969.

Christina's parents divorced in 1960, precipitated by her father's affair with opera singer Maria Callas. He later married former US first lady Jacqueline Kennedy, widow of US president John F. Kennedy, in 1968. Christina's mother married in 1971 Stavros Niarchos, the widower of her sister and Christina's aunt Eugenia Livanos in 1971.

Within a 29-month period, Christina lost her entire immediate family. Her brother Alexander died in a plane crash in Athens in 1973 at 24, which devastated the family. Her mother died of a suspected drug overdose in 1974, leaving Christina her $77 million estate. Her father's health deteriorated after Alexander's death, and he died in March 1975. After her father's death, Christina renounced her U.S. citizenship and donated the American portion of her holdings in her father's company to the American Hospital of Paris (she held dual citizenship in Greece and Argentina throughout her life).

== Career ==
Upon Alexander's death, Aristotle Onassis began grooming his daughter to take over the family business. She was sent to New York City to work in his office. After Aristotle's death, she inherited 55% of his fortune, then estimated to be worth $500 million. The remaining 45% funded a foundation established in Alexander's memory, the Alexander S. Onassis Foundation. After a legal settlement, Jacqueline Onassis received $26 million from the estate. Christina was the focus of her father's attention until his death; he considered her his successor and trained her in the business operations of the Onassis business empire. She carried the mantle of the Onassis shipping empire, successfully running the business after her father's death.

Christina received considerable media attention for her lavish lifestyle, spending habits, and turbulent personal life. Her frequent battles with her weight and inability to find lasting love left her unhappy, despite her wealth. She frequently went on crash diets and would lose large amounts of weight, only to gain it back when she became depressed. Diagnosed with clinical depression at the age of 30, she was prescribed barbiturates, amphetamines, and sleeping pills, to which she developed an addiction. Onassis was reportedly hospitalized for overdosing on sleeping pills in the 1970s.

== Personal life ==
In a period of 16 years, Onassis married four times, each ending in divorce. She wed her first husband, real estate developer Joseph Bolker, at age 20 in 1971. Bolker was a divorced father of four, 27 years her senior. Onassis's father reportedly disapproved and pressured her to divorce him. The marriage ended after nine months.

Her second husband was Greek shipping and banking heir Alexander Andreadis, whom she married shortly after her father's death in 1975. They divorced after 14 months.

Onassis's third husband was Russian shipping agent Sergei Kauzov, whom she married in 1978. They divorced the following year.

Her fourth and final marriage was to French businessman Thierry Roussel in 1984. Onassis and Roussel had a daughter, Athina (named after Onassis' mother), in 1985. They divorced after Onassis discovered that Roussel had fathered a child with his long-time mistress, Swedish model Marianne "Gaby" Landhage, during the marriage.

== Death ==
On 19 November 1988, Christina's body was found by her maid in the bathtub of a mansion in Tortuguitas, outside of Buenos Aires, where she had been staying. An autopsy found no evidence of suicide, drug overdose or foul play, but found that Onassis had died of a heart attack caused by acute pulmonary edema. She was 37 years old. A private Greek Orthodox funeral was held for her on 20 November at a chapel on the Onassis-owned island of Skorpios, where she was buried in the Onassis family plot alongside her father and brother.

Onassis willed her fortune, worth an estimated $250 million (equivalent to $681 million in 2025), to her only child, Athina. Raised in Switzerland by her father, Thierry Roussel and his wife, Marianne "Gaby" Landhage, Athina gained control of half of the estate on her 18th birthday.

== References and sources ==
Sources

- Ioannidis, Paul (2015). Destiny Prevails: My Life with Aristotle, Alexander, Christina Onassis and her daughter, Athina. New York: Significance Press-paperback or kindle edition. ISBN 978-0990757474.
