= Bois-de-Vaux Cemetery =

Cemetery in Lausanne, Switzerland

Coordinates: 46°31′17″N 6°35′57″E

Bois-de-Vaux Cemetery Cimetière du Bois-de-Vaux
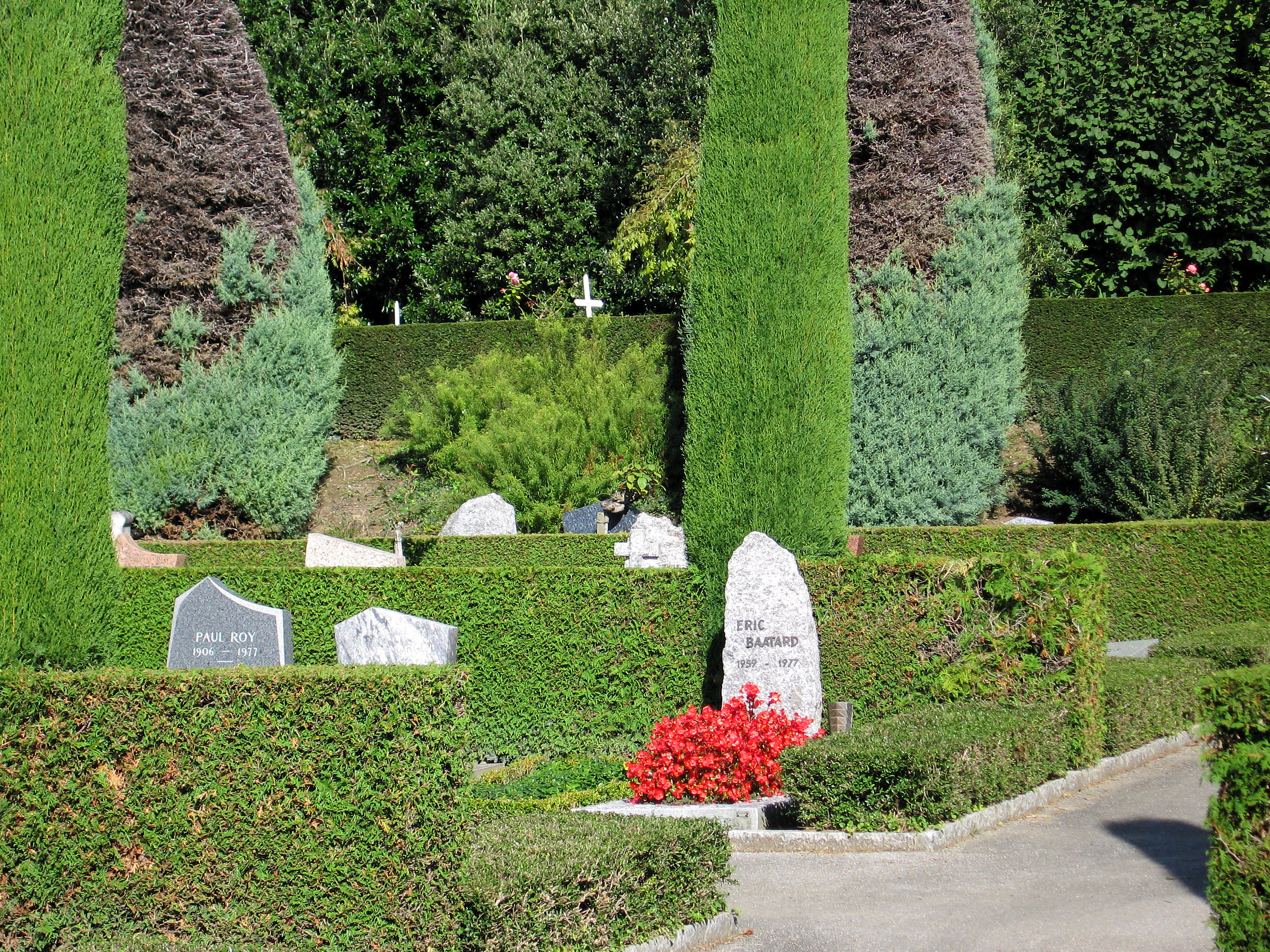
- Interactive map of Bois-de-Vaux Cemetery; Cimetière du Bois-de-Vaux

Details
- Established: 1922
- Location: Route de Chavannes, Lausanne, Canton of Vaud
- Country: Switzerland
- Size: 20 acres (8.1 ha)
- No. of interments: 26,000
- Website: Official website

The Bois-de-Vaux Cemetery (French: Cimetière du Bois-de-Vaux) is the principal burial ground of Lausanne in Switzerland.

Laid out by the architect Alphonse Laverrière between 1922 and 1951, the cemetery lies to the south of the town and has been designated as a cultural property of national importance (bien culturel suisse d'importance nationale).

== Description ==
There is a long central avenue lined with two rows of lime trees, banks stocked with flowering plants, ponds with fish and water lilies, many benches, and forty kilometres of hedges. Together with thousands of trees they provide homes for many different birds, while the other wildlife living in the hedges and undeveloped parts of the cemetery includes badgers, foxes, squirrels and hedgehogs. The cemetery has enough room for 26,000 plots.

When the city of Lausanne heard in 1929 that the American bishop Charles Brent had died in Lausanne and wished to be buried there, they offered a plot for his remains in the section of the Bois-de-Vaux cemetery reserved for distinguished foreigners.

== Notable graves ==
- Eugène Viollet-le-Duc (1814–1879), area 18, plot 101
- Charles Brent (1862–1929)
- Pierre de Coubertin (1863–1937), area 9, plots 153-154
- Alphonse Laverrière (1872-1954), area 1
- Eugenia Livanos-Niarchos (1927–1970)
- Coco Chanel (1883–1971), area 9, plot 129
- Tina Onassis Niarchos (1929–1974)
- Paul Robert (1910–1980), area 9, plot 127
- Gloria Guinness (1913–1980)
- Loel Guinness (1906–1988)
- Pierre Dudan (1916–1984)
- Stavros Niarchos (1909–1996)
- Han Suyin (1916-2012)

== Royal graves ==
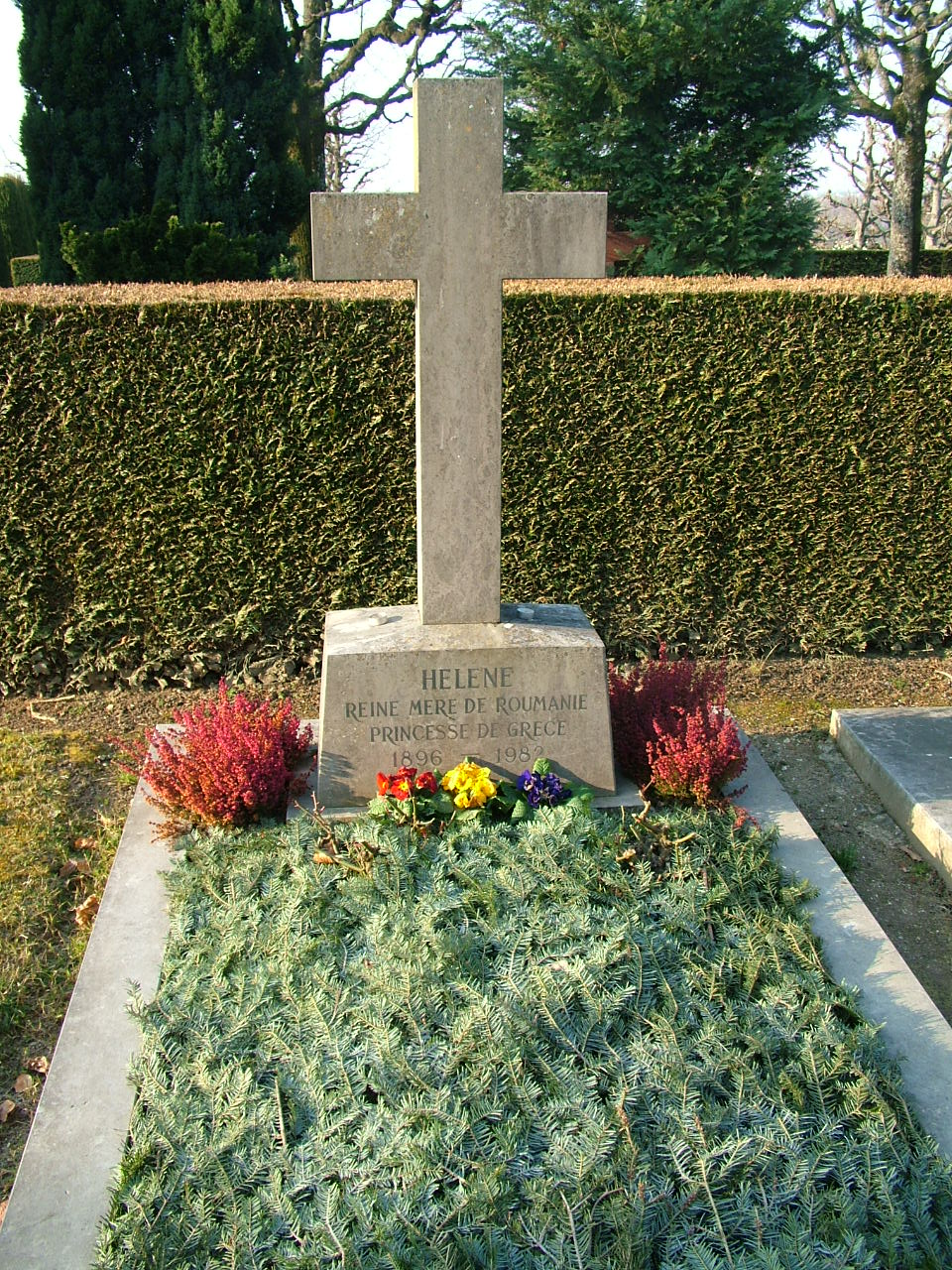
Former grave of Queen Mother Helen of Romania

Some members of the exiled Yugoslav royal family were initially buried here, but their remains were later moved to the mausoleum at Oplenac, Serbia, when allowed by the government in Belgrade:

- Prince Nicholas of Yugoslavia (1928–1954)
- Prince Paul of Yugoslavia (1893–1976), former Regent of Yugoslavia, father of Prince Nicholas
- Princess Olga of Greece and Denmark (1903–1997), mother of Prince Nicholas

Also, the Queen Mother of Romania, a first cousin and friend of Princess Olga, was buried in the cemetery in 1982, but in 2019 her remains were due to be moved to the Curtea de Argeș Cathedral in Romania:

- Princess Helen of Greece and Denmark (1896–1982)

== Gallery ==
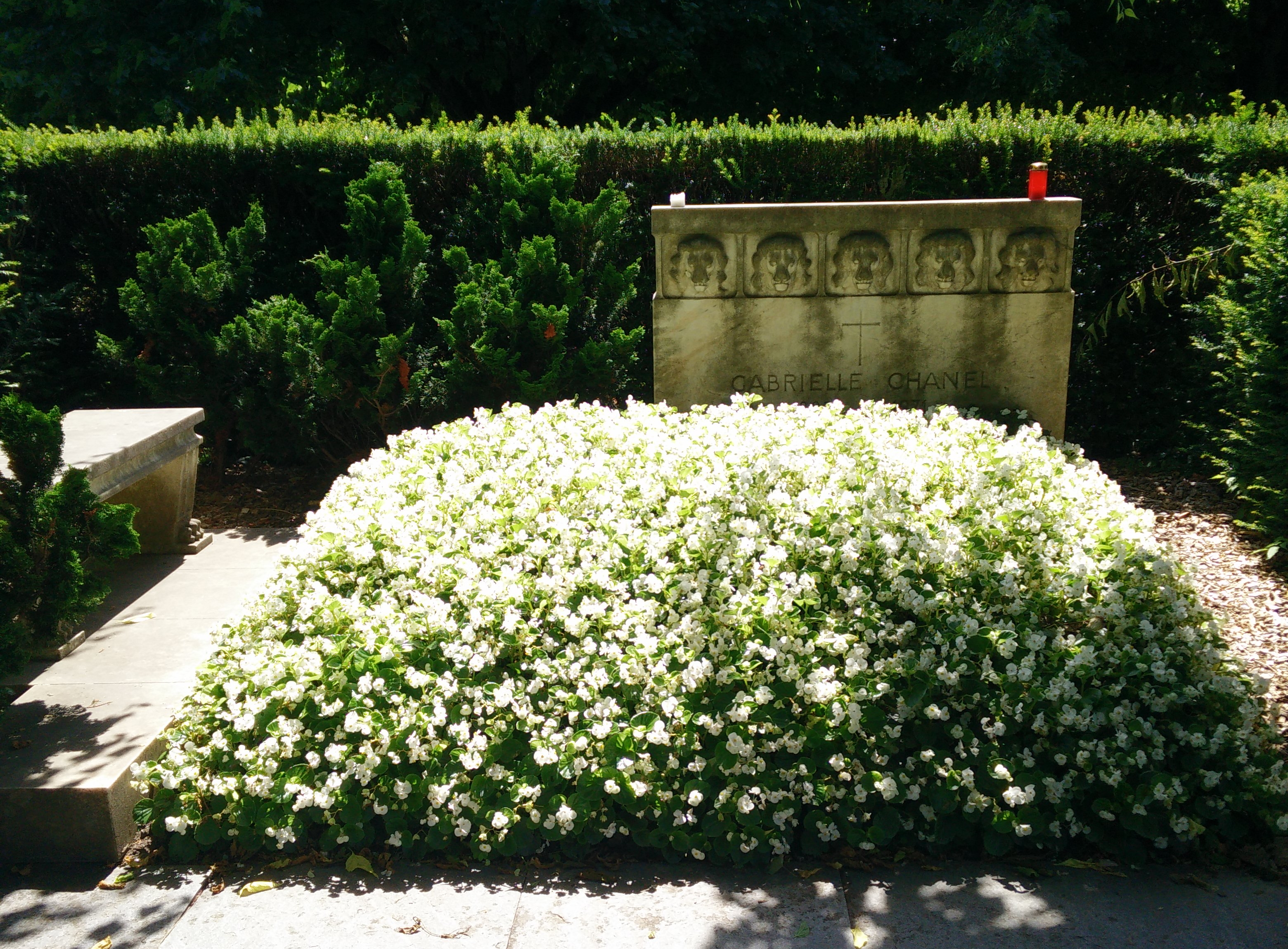
Grave of Gabrielle "Coco" Chanel

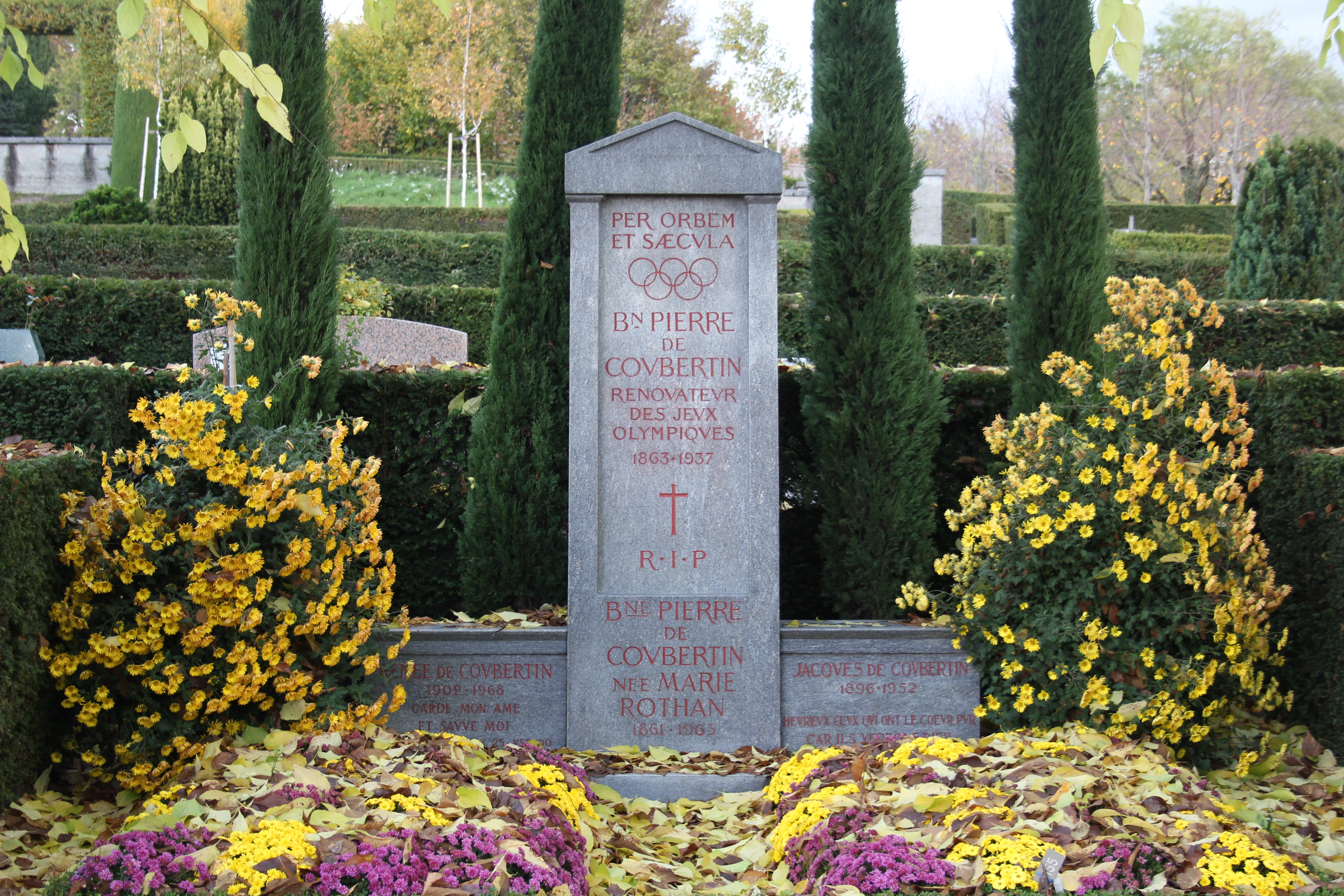
Grave of Baron Pierre de Coubertin

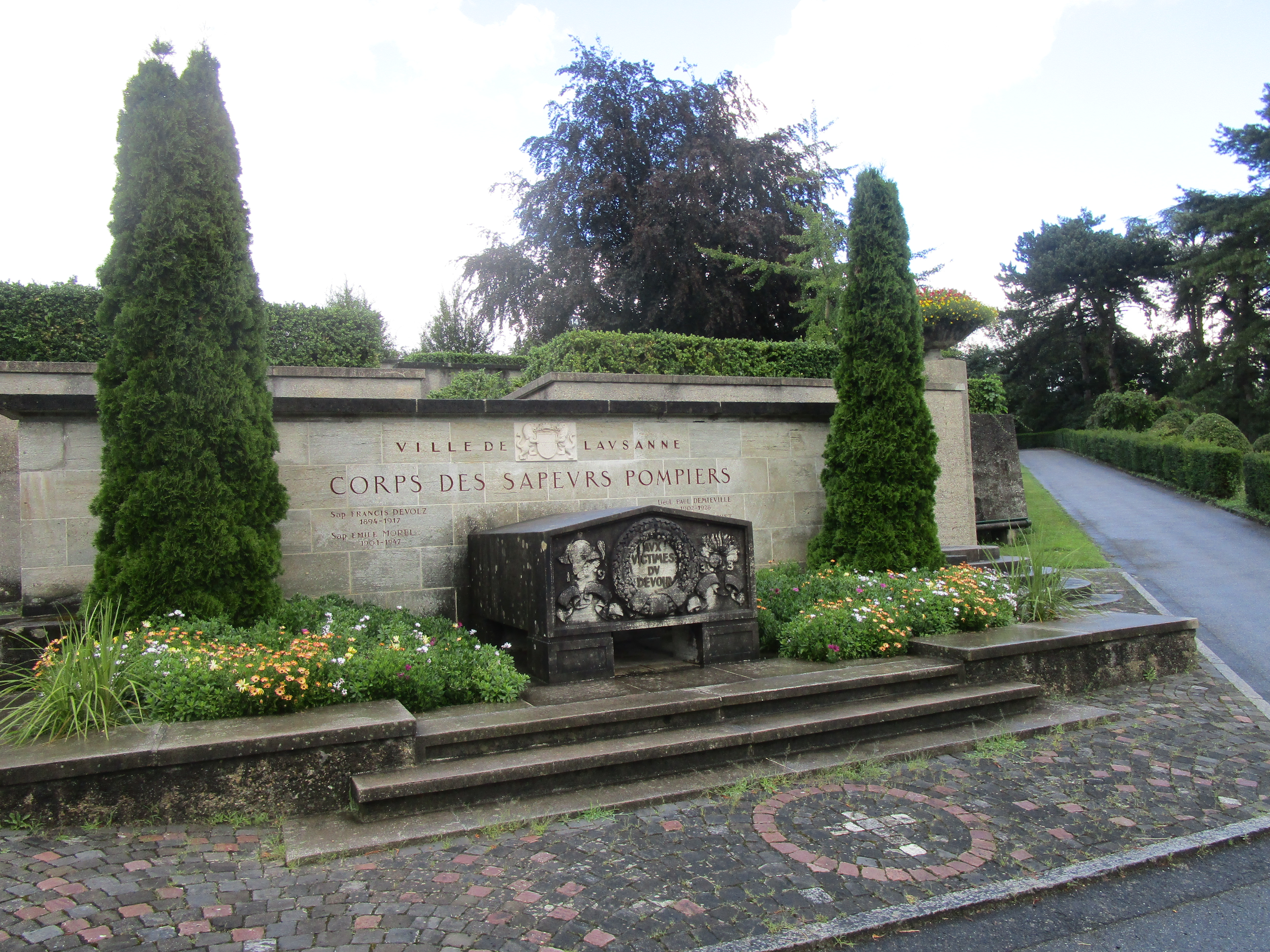
Firefighters' monument

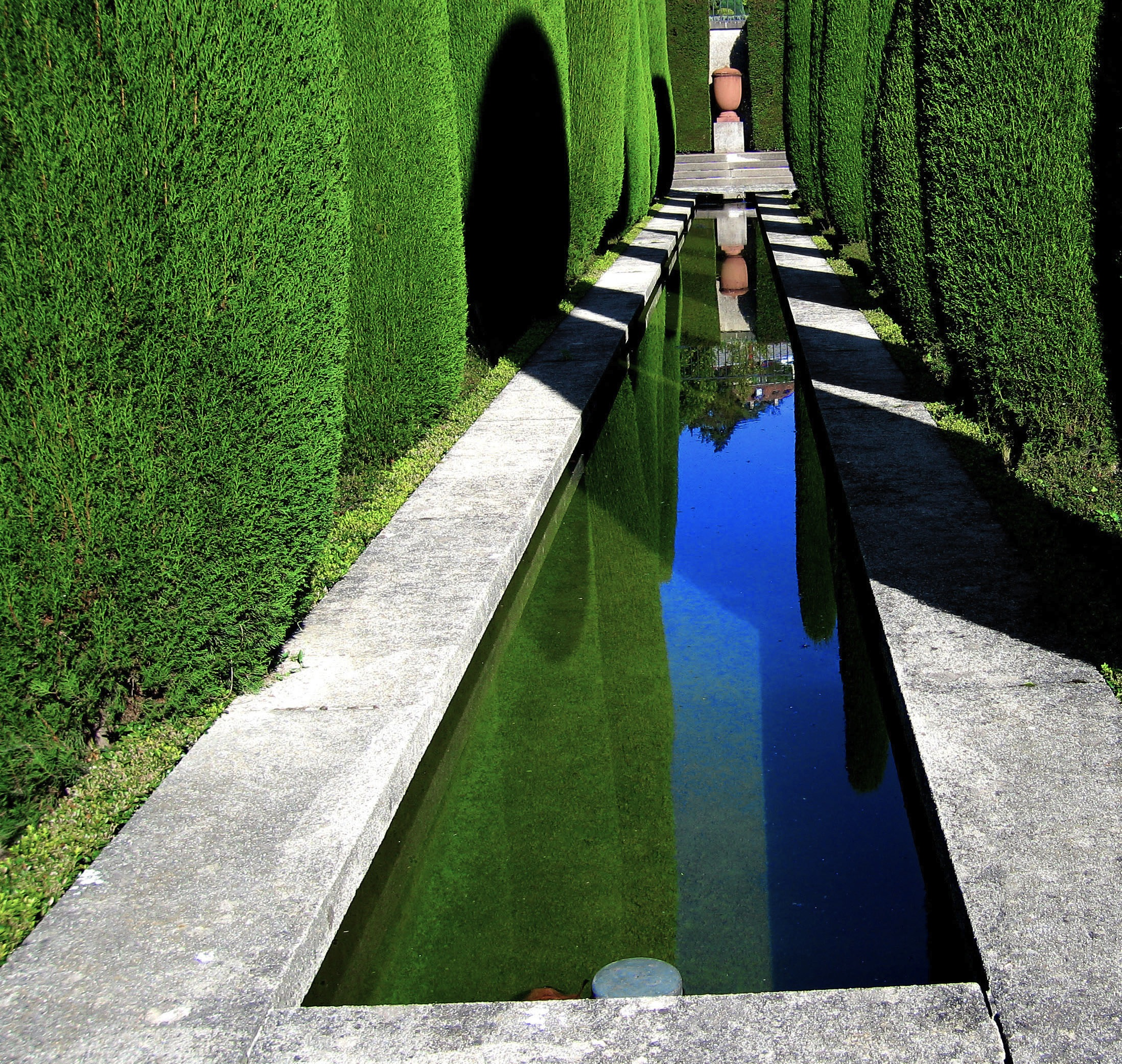
Water feature

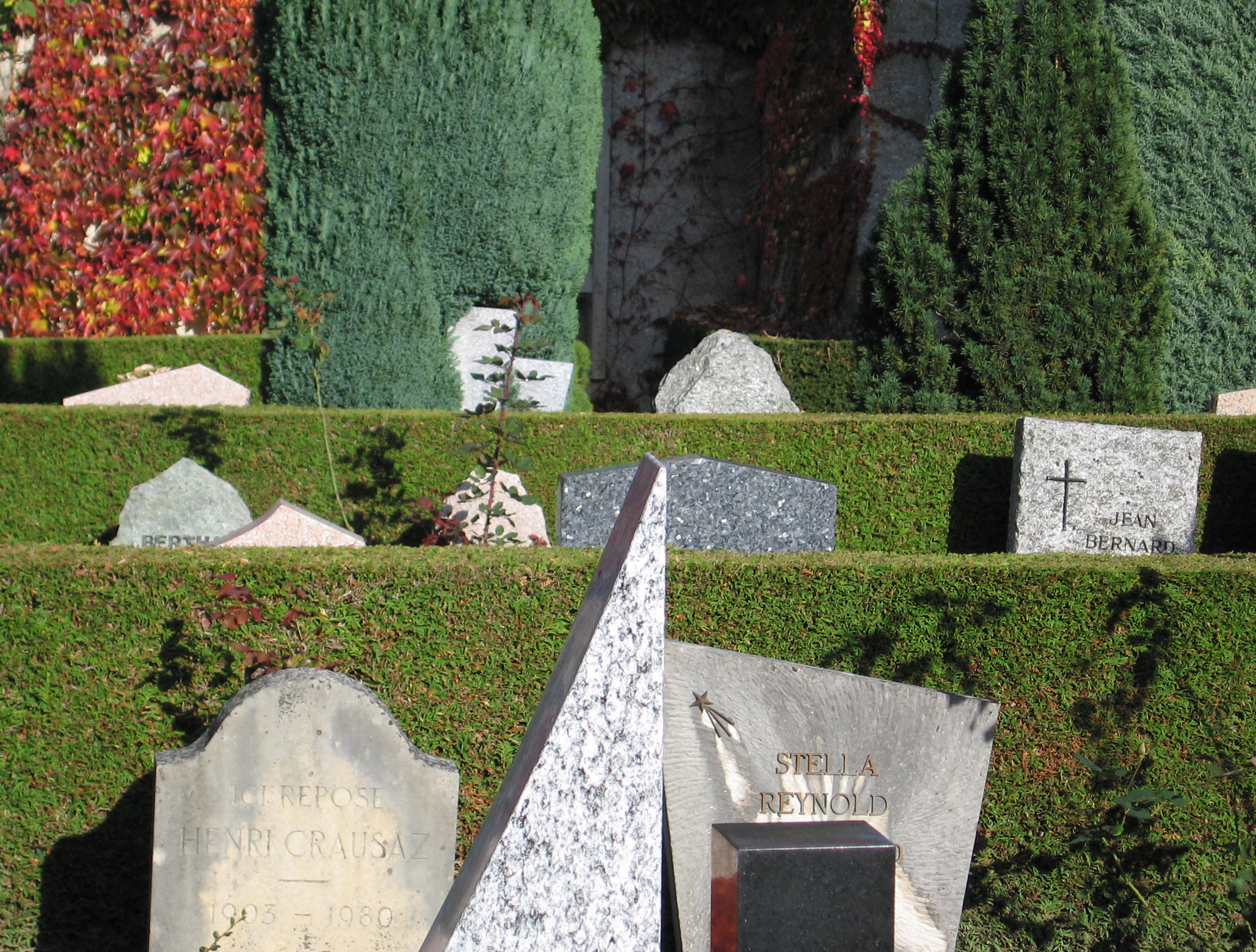
Arrangement of graves

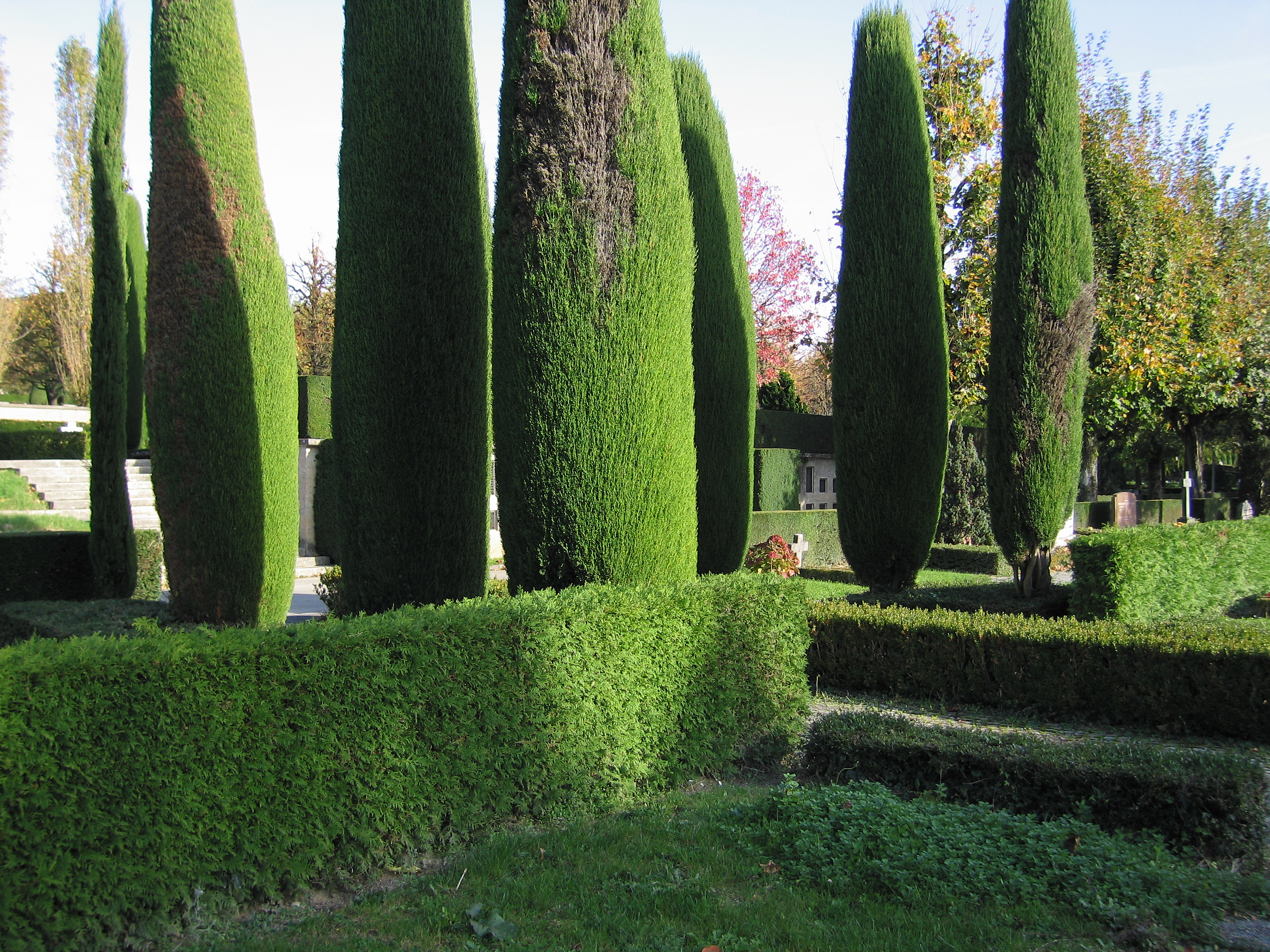
Trees
