= Stavros Niarchos Foundation =

Greek foundation

- Founded: 1996; 30 years ago
- Founder: Stavros Niarchos
- Type: Charitable
- Purpose: Arts and culture; Education; Health and sports; Social welfare
- Location(s): Athens, Greece; Monte Carlo, Monaco; New York City
- Region served: Global
- Method: Grants, funding
- Website: www.snf.org

The Stavros Niarchos Foundation (SNF) is a philanthropic organization established upon Stavros Niarchos' death in 1996. Niarchos was one of the world's largest transporters of oil and owned the largest supertanker fleet of his time. The Foundation has offices in Athens, New York, and Monaco, and provides grants in more than 130 countries. The Foundation is led by Andreas Dracopoulos, great-nephew of Stavros Niarchos, and his cousins Spyros and Philip Niarchos who serve as co-presidents.

== History ==
The Stavros Niarchos Foundation was established in 1996 following the death of Greek shipping magnate Stavros Niarchos, who fully endowed the foundation. The foundation's leadership is led by Andreas Dracopoulos, great-nephew of founder Stavros Niarchos, and his two cousins Spyros and Philip Niarchos who serve as co-presidents.

Following the Greek financial crisis, the SNF funded projects including mobile medical care stations, school meals, and homeless shelters. The SNF allocated $100 million in 2010 for initiatives addressing hunger and poverty in Greece. In 2012, the foundation provided donations focused on Greek youth unemployment programs.

The SNF donated to healthcare projects globally, including the construction of new hospitals in Komotini, Thessaloniki, and Sparta in Greece. The SNF built and transferred ownership of the Stavros Niarchos Foundation Cultural Center to the Greek government in 2017. The complex houses the Greek National Opera, the National Library of Greece, and the Stavros Niarchos Park.

The Foundation and the NGO Movement on the Ground funded The Barca Soccer FutbolNet programme which began July 2017. As of 2018, the SNF partially funded the Culture Pass program, which enabled cardholders from the New York Public Library, Brooklyn Public Library, and Queens Library to access 33 cultural institutions across the city without charge. SNF funded the Street Vendor Project in 2020, which provided meals to those lacking food security in New York City.

The SNF partnered with Rockefeller University in 2019 to create the Stavros Niarchos Foundation-David Rockefeller River Campus. In 2022, the SNF donated $75 million to Rockefeller University for the creation of an infectious disease institute. The SNF also donated $75 million to Columbia University for the creation of the SNF Center for Precision Psychiatry and Mental Health in April 2023.
