= Life Extension Society =

Defunct 1964 human cryonic preservation advocacy, revived in 1992

The Life Extension Society (LES) with its network of coordinators was the first cryonics organization in the world. It was founded by Evan Cooper in 1964 to promote cryonic suspension of people, and became the seed tree for cryonics societies throughout the US where local cryonics advocates would meet as a result of contact through the LES mailing list. The original LES ceased existence near the end of the 1960s, but an organization with the same name and similar objectives was incorporated in Maryland in 1992.

== History ==
In 1962, Cooper privately published a manuscript named Immortality: Physically, Scientifically, Now under his pseudonym, Nathan Duhring. The book is considered by Michael Darwin "a modest, almost apologetic one; the ideas it contains are the stuff of genius and the fabric of change, in it, he advocated that men need not be born only to die and that if they were frozen at or near the time of death they might yet have a chance to live again, whole and complete, forever." In the same year, but shortly after Cooper's book appeared, a Michigan college physics teacher, Robert Ettinger, privately published his book The Prospect of Immortality, that independently suggested the same idea. Ettinger came to be credited as the originator of cryonics, perhaps because his book was republished by Doubleday in 1964 on the recommendations of Isaac Asimov and Fred Pohl, and received more publicity. Ettinger also stayed with the movement longer. Nevertheless, the cryonics historian R. Michael Perry has written: “Evan Cooper deserves the principal credit for forming an organized cryonics movement.”

== See also ==
- Life extension
