= Daphne Guinness =

British socialite (born 1967)

The Honourable Daphne Guinness
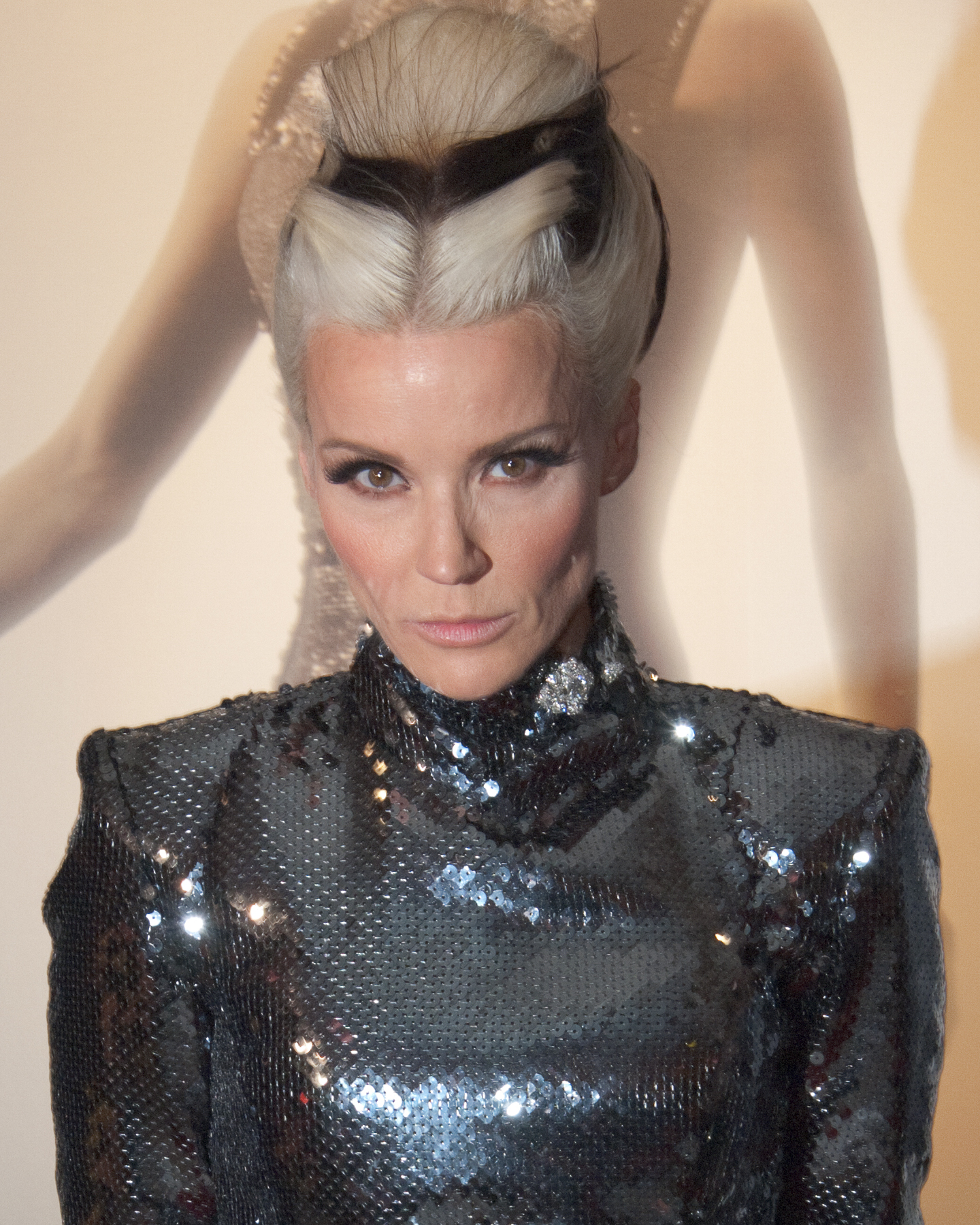
- Guinness in 2011
- Born: Daphne Diana Joan Susanna Guinness; 9 November 1967 (age 59); London, England
- Spouse: Spyros Niarchos (m. 1987; div. 1999)
- Partner: Bernard-Henri Lévy
- Children: 3
- Modelling information
- Height: 1.72 m (5 ft 8 in)
- Hair colour: Brown and platinum blonde
- Eye colour: Brown

Hon. Daphne Diana Joan Susanna Guinness (born 9 November 1967) is an English fashion designer, socialite, actress, film producer, and musician.

== Early life ==
Her father is Jonathan Guinness, 3rd Baron Moyne, the eldest son of Diana Mitford and Bryan Guinness. Her mother is Suzanne Lisney (died 2005), her father's second wife. Her brother is Hon. Sebastian Walter Denis Guinness (born 1964).

Diana Mitford was the daughter of David Freeman-Mitford, 2nd Baron Redesdale, the father of the Mitford sisters. Mitford divorced Guinness and married the leader of the British Union of Fascists, Sir Oswald Mosley, 6th Baronet of Ancoats. Daphne Guinness has said she did not know of Mosley's political affiliations, before she heard in 1980 on the BBC News that he had died.

As a child, Daphne Guinness grew up moving between the country houses owned by her family in England and Ireland, and a villa in Spain, where Salvador Dalí was a family friend. She later lived in New York with her half-sister, Catherine Guinness, who was working as a Personal Assistant to Andy Warhol.

== Fashion ==
Guinness has been a fashion model, a curator, and fashion writer. Christian Allaire of Vogue referred to her as a "street style icon, producer, musician, and muse of Alexander McQueen and Karl Lagerfeld". Guinness has been described as a "performance artist" by The New York Times for her use of and experimentation with fashion. She has appeared on the covers of multiple international editions of Vogue, Harper's Bazaar, Tatler, Zoo Magazine, and other fashion magazines.

Guinness has written numerous pieces on the topic of fashion, including columns published in Vogue, the Financial Times, The Times of London, and Harper's Bazaar. She also wrote the foreword to Alexander McQueen: Fashion Visionary, contributed to Dressed to Kill: Jazz Age Fashion, and co-authored Art/Fashion in the 21st Century. As a designer, Guinness has designed a collection of shirts with Comme des Garçons for Dover Street Market, and created an estimated 100 pieces for herself in 2010 with no intention of selling them. She designed Contra Mundum, an 18-carat white gold glove encrusted with diamonds, with British jeweler Shaun Leane and Alexander McQueen. The glove was worn in McQueen's shows, and was auctioned at Sotheby's in 2017.

She was named to the International Best Dressed List Hall of Fame in 1994. Guinness has styled photo shoots for photographers Steven Klein and David LaChappelle.

Following a divorce in 1999, Guinness became more involved in the avant-garde fashion movement, establishing relationships within the fashion industry. Guinness was a close friend of the late fashion designer Alexander McQueen and, according to Vogue, she "nurtured" his career.

In 2004, she was brought on as a fashion consultant for Gucci by François-Henri Pinault.

Following the 2007 death of magazine editor Isabella Blow, Guinness purchased Blow's entire fashion collection, months before it was scheduled to be auctioned by Christie's in 2010. In 2014, Guinness exhibited more than 100 pieces of Blow's collection at Somerset House.

In 2009, she created a scent named Daphne for Comme des Garçons. Guinness collaborated with NARS Cosmetics as the model for the fall 2010 campaign, which included an eyeshadow named after her. In 2011, she released a 21-product makeup line with MAC Cosmetics that included blushes, lipsticks and nail polishes.

She curated an exhibition at the Fashion Institute of Technology in 2011 that featured more than 100 contemporary pieces by various designers, including Alexander McQueen, Chanel, Valentino, and others, all from her personal couture collection. The exhibit also featured The Phenomenology of Body, a short film Guinness directed focused on costumes through the ages.

As a tribute to the deaths of Isabella Blow and Alexander McQueen, in 2011 Guinness dressed in public for the Met Gala in a Barneys window; she wore a feathered McQueen dress and other pieces from Blow's collection.

== Film ==
=== Producer ===
Guinness has produced and edited three short films:

- Cashback, a short film nominated for an Academy Award in 2004, was later made into a feature-length version. Guinness produced this film for the photographer Sean Ellis.

=== Acting ===
In 2011, Guinness starred in Joe Lally's film, The Murder of Jean Seberg.

At the end of 2011, photographers Markus Klinko and Indrani, Guinness, and stylist GK Reid produced The Legend of Lady White Snake, a film based on a Chinese legend, where Guinness played the central role of Lady White Snake. Bernard-Henri Lévy wrote her dialogue for the film.

In 2012, Guinness starred in Shakki, a science fiction short film directed by Julien Landais.

== Music ==
David Bowie encouraged Guinness to pursue music, introducing her to Tony Visconti, who had produced three of her albums as of August 2020.

=== Optimist in Black (2016) ===
After the deaths of her brother Jasper, mentor David Bowie, and friends Isabella Blow and Alexander McQueen, Guinness went to a studio in Ireland, intending to record a cover of the Bob Dylan song "Desolation Row". While there, she wrote and recorded original songs which became the basis for her first album, Optimist in Black. Optimist in Black was released on 27 May 2016, through private label Agent Anonyme/Absolute. The album was described by Kim Taylor Bennett of Vice magazine as "drama-pop with a gothic tinge" and by Matthew Schneier of The New York Times as having "a glam-rock-ish, slightly psychedelic flavor".

=== Daphne & the Golden Chord (2018) ===
In April 2018, Guinness released her second album, Daphne & the Golden Chord, also produced by Visconti. The album was recorded on analog tapes at British Grove Studios in a three-week session. The band included 58 instrumentalists including timpani, tambourine, and bassoon players. Will Hodgkinson of The Times described the album as "aristocratic glam fuelled by wit, character and a clear and abiding love of rock'n'roll".

=== Revelations (2020) ===
Guinness' third album, Revelations, was released in August 2020. Like her prior two albums, it was produced by Visconti. Thomas Barrie of British GQ said Revelations features "lusher, disco-inflected instrumentation, with flourishes arranged by Visconti in strings, and parts written for more experimental, obscure instruments like the theremin and ocarina". Guinness collaborated with David LaChapelle on a three-part film series also titled Revelations, which featured songs from the album and explored references to the Book of Revelation.

=== Sleep (2024) ===
Guinness released her fourth album, Sleep on June 21, 2024. The album was recorded at British Grove and Abbey Road studios. It was mixed by Ricky Damian, known for his work with Lady Gaga, Adele, Georgia Smith, Dua Lipa. Other collaborators on the album included Malcolm Doherty, Tony Visconti (who scored the album's strings), Guy Pratt and Rob Shirakbari. It also features a 34-piece string section.

The album's singles were also released as remixes, remixed by artists including Hercules & Love Affair and Joe Goddard.

Entertainment website Culture Fix listed Sleep as one of the best albums of 2024, describing it as "a sleek and sophisticated blend of gothic charm, art-pop allure, and esoteric creativity."

=== Music videos ===
Guinness' music career began with the release in 2013 and 2014 of several music videos for songs which would later be included in her first album. These early videos include "Fatal Flaw" (directed by Nick Knight) in 2013, and "Evening in Space", directed by LaChapelle, in 2014. Jessie Peterson of MTV News said the video took the "fashion world to space". It featured costumes from designers such as Iris van Herpen and Noritaka Tatehana.

Guinness also released music video versions for two songs that were on the 2018 Daphne & the Golden Chord album – "Talking to Yourself" and "Remember to Breathe".

Two music videos directed by LaChapelle were released in 2020 for "Hallucinations" and "Heaven", two of the songs on the Revelations album.

Guinness collaborated with Nick Knight again in 2023 on the video for "Hip Neck Spine", the first single to be taken from her fourth album "Sleep". The video for the follow up single, "Mishima" was directed by Paul Fryer. David LaChappelle directed the videos for two singles from the "Sleep" album - "Volcano"and "Time".

== Charity work ==
Guinness has walked in two of Naomi Campbell's Fashion for Relief shows to raise funds for disaster victims. In April 2008, she auctioned off part of her wardrobe, with the proceeds going to a British charity called Womankind Worldwide, which deals with issues such as domestic violence.

In June 2010, Guinness purchased at auction the entire wardrobe of Isabella Blow, her friend who died by suicide in 2007. The lot was purchased prior to an auction, which was arranged at Christie's. She later announced that she would be displaying the wardrobe at Central Saint Martins and online, as well as starting a foundation to help with mental illness. The official show, entitled "Isabella Blow: Fashion Galore," was displayed in November 2013 at Somerset House in London.

In February 2013, Guinness, along with Baroness Monica von Neumann and Lynn Ban, donated a collection of her shoes to the Museum at Fashion Institute of Technology's Shoe Obsession exhibit.

== Personal life ==
In 1987, Guinness married Spyros Niarchos, the second son of Stavros Niarchos.

Her $39 million settlement, obtained at the time of her 1999 divorce, was added to her Guinness inheritance.

The couple has three children:

- Nicolas Stavros Niarchos (born 1989)
- Alexis Spyros Niarchos (born 1991)
- Ines Sophia Niarchos (born 1995)

Guinness lives in London and Manhattan with her three children.

She has been romantically involved with French philosopher Bernard-Henri Lévy for a number of years. In the February 2011 issue of Harper's Bazaar, Guinness confirmed to journalist Derek Blasberg: "He is obviously the love of my life".
