= Spyros Niarchos =

Greek shipping heir

Spyros Stavros Niarchos (Greek: Σπύρος Νιάρχος; born 1955) is a Greek shipping magnate. He is the second son of Stavros Niarchos and Eugenia Livanos, and through his mother the grandson of Stavros G. Livanos.

== Biography ==
In 1955 Vickers Armstrongs Shipbuilders Ltd launched for Stavros Niarchos what was then the world's largest supertanker. The 30,708 GRT ship was named SS Spyros Niarchos after his son.

In 1987, while skiing in Switzerland, he met 19-year-old Daphne Guinness (artist, socialite and an heiress of the Guinness family) and they soon married. The marriage ended in divorce, with Guinness receiving a $39 million settlement in 1999.

The couple has three children:

- Nicolas Stavros Niarchos (born 1989)
- Alexis Spyros Niarchos (born 1991)
- Ines Sophia Niarchos (born 1995)

=== Relationships ===
In January 1999, Niarchos was a witness at the wedding of his best friend, Ernst August, Prince of Hanover. He is the godfather of Crown Prince Pavlos' youngest son, Aristides-Stavros. With his brother, Philip, Niarchos is co-president and member of the board of directors at the Stavros Niarchos Foundation.
