= Sylvia Martins =

Brazilian painter (born 1956)

Sylvia Martins (born 1956) is a Brazilian painter.

Born in Bagé, Martins studied at the Museum of Modern Art, Rio de Janeiro from 1973 to 1976. She then moved to New York, studying at the School of Visual Arts in 1978 and at the Art Students League of New York from 1979 to 1982. She has shown work in solo and group exhibits around the world. For many years, she dated Richard Gere, before marrying billionaire Constantine Niarchos in 1997. Her paintings are mainly abstract.
