= Aristotle Onassis =

Greek business magnate (1906–1975)

- Αριστοτέλης Ωνάσης
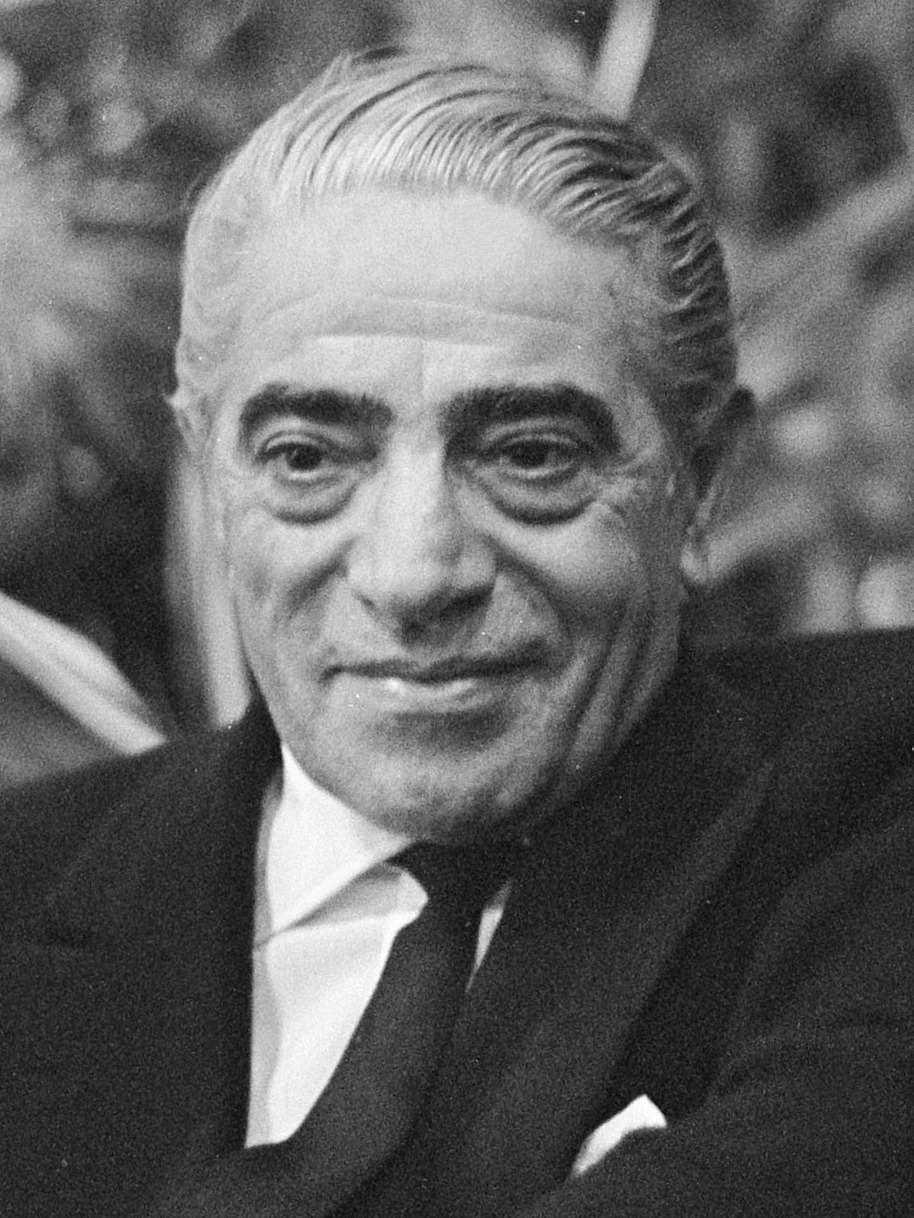
- Onassis in 1967
- Born: Aristotle Socrates Onassis; 20 January 1906; Smyrna, Ottoman Empire (now Izmir, Turkey)
- Died: 15 March 1975 (aged 69); Neuilly-sur-Seine, France
- Burial place: Skorpios Island, Greece
- Citizenship: Greece; Argentina
- Occupation: Businessman
- Organization: Onassis Foundation
- Spouses: Tina Livanos (m. 1946; div. 1960); Jacqueline Kennedy (m. 1968)
- Partner: Maria Callas (1959–1968)
- Children: Alexander; Christina
- Relatives: Athina Onassis (granddaughter)

Aristotle Socrates Onassis (/oʊˈnæsɪs/, US also /-ˈnɑː-/; Greek: Αριστοτέλης Ωνάσης, romanized: Aristotélis Onásis, pronounced [aristoˈtelis oˈnasis]; 20 January 1906 – 15 March 1975) was a Greek business magnate and shipping tycoon. He amassed the world's largest privately owned shipping fleet and was one of the world's richest and most famous men. He was married to Athina Mary Livanos, had a long-standing affair with opera singer Maria Callas, and in his final years was married to American former First Lady Jacqueline Kennedy.

Onassis was born in Smyrna in the Ottoman Empire to Greek parents and fled the city with his family to Greece in 1922 in the wake of the burning of Smyrna. He moved to Argentina in 1923 and established himself as a tobacco trader and later a shipping owner during the Second World War. Moving to Monaco, Onassis fought Prince Rainier III for economic control of the country through his ownership of SBM and its Monte Carlo Casino. In the mid-1950s, he sought to secure an oil shipping arrangement with Saudi Arabia and engaged in whaling expeditions. In the 1960s, Onassis attempted to establish a large investment contract—Project Omega—with the Greek military junta and sold Olympic Airways, which he had founded in 1957. He was greatly affected by the death of his son, Alexander, in 1973 and died two years later.

== Early life ==
=== Ottoman Empire ===
Aristotle Socrates Onassis was born in 1906 in Karataş, a suburb of the Ottoman port city of Smyrna (now İzmir, Turkey) in Anatolia to Greek parents, Socrates Onassis and Penelope Dologlou. One of his grandfathers, Hristos Konialidis, was a Cappadocian Greek who originated from Talas, Kayseri and migrated to Akhisar for trade in the 19th century. Aristotle had one sister, Artemis, and two half-sisters, Kalliroi and Merope, by his father's second marriage following Penelope's death (1912).

Socrates Onassis became a successful shipping entrepreneur and sent his children to prestigious schools. When Aristotle graduated from the local Evangelical Greek School at the age of 16, he spoke four languages: Greek (his native language), Turkish, Spanish, and English.

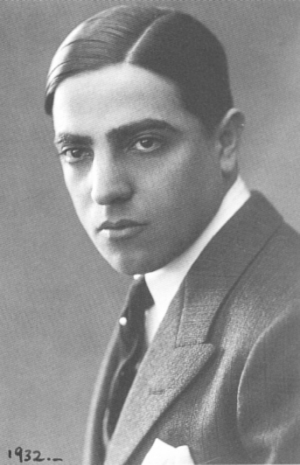
Onassis, 1932

Smyrna was invaded by Greece (1919–1922) in the aftermath of the Allied victory in World War I, but then Smyrna was recaptured by Turkey during the Greco-Turkish War (1919–22). The Onassis family's substantial property holdings were lost, causing them to become refugees fleeing to Greece after the Great Fire of Smyrna in 1922. During this period, Onassis lost three uncles, an aunt and her husband, Chrysostomos Konialidis and their daughter, who were burned to death in a church in Akhisar where 500 Christians were seeking shelter from the Great Fire of Smyrna. The Asia Minor catastrophe in 1922 was devastating for the Onassis family. His father was imprisoned and his business was transferred to Turkish ownership. The rest of the family fled to Greece where they had to stay in an outdoor refugee camp.

=== Argentina ===
In 1923, Onassis returned to Istanbul with $250 in his pocket. In August of that year, he arrived in Buenos Aires, Argentina, by Nansen passport, and got his first job as a telephone operator with the British United River Plate Telephone Company, while following studies in commerce and port-duty administration at Aduanas Argentinas. He later became an entrepreneur, creating an Argentine import-export company, going into business for himself, and making a fortune importing English-Turkish tobacco to Argentina. He reportedly told Maria Callas that he made his fortune in Buenos Aires by forming a shipping company used for trafficking heroin. He obtained Argentine citizenship in 1929. Eventually he established his first shipping trading company in Buenos Aires, Astilleros Onassis. After gaining his first fortune in Argentina, he expanded his shipping business worldwide and relocated to New York City, United States, where he built up his shipping business empire while keeping offices in Buenos Aires and Athens. His legacy in Buenos Aires was the creation of a shipping empire and a Hellenic Culture Fund providing youth scholarships and an academic international exchange program between Argentina, Greece, Monaco and the United States; the programs are funded and administered by the Onassis Foundation and were eventually under the managing direction of his daughter Christina Onassis.

== Business ==
=== Shipping ===
Onassis built up a fleet of freighters and tankers that eventually exceeded seventy vessels. Most of the fleet operated under flags of convenience where laws and regulations are looser than those of the owners' country. More austere regulations in countries such as the United States, which afforded higher wages and safety standards, allowed access to domestic routes with higher freight rates but at far greater running expense. As was then common practice in international shipping, Onassis's fleet had mostly Panamanian and Liberian flags and sailed tax-free while operating at low cost. This and his astute business sense helped Onassis earn handsome profits in the highly competitive shipping market. Onassis made large profits when the Big Oil companies like Mobil, Socony, and Texaco signed long-term contracts known as time charters at fixed prices before the stock market fell.

The high profitability of the Onassis fleet has been attributed in large part to his disregard for standards that normally govern international shipping. For example, after his Liberian-registered tanker SS Arrow ran aground and spilled oil into Chedabucto Bay, Nova Scotia in 1970, still the most significant oil spill off Canada's East Coast (about 25% of the amount spilled by the Exxon Valdez in Alaska in 1989), there was a Commission of Inquiry. Led by Patrick McTaggart-Cowan, executive director of the Science Council of Canada, the Commission found that the Arrow had been operating with almost none of its navigation equipment serviceable: "radar had ceased to function an hour before the ship struck; the echo sounder had not been in working condition for two months; and the gyrocompass... had a permanent error of three degrees west. The officer on watch at the time of the accident, the ship's third officer, "had no license" and none of the crew had any navigational skill except the master, "and there are even doubts about his ability."

=== Monaco ===
Onassis arrived in the Mediterranean principality of Monaco in 1953 and began to purchase the shares of Monaco's Société des bains de mer de Monaco (SBM) via the use of front companies in the tax haven of Panama, and took control of the organisation in the summer of that year. Onassis moved his headquarters into the Old Sporting Club on Monaco's Avenue d'Ostende shortly after taking control of the SBM. The SBM was a significant owner of property in Monaco: its assets included the Monte Carlo Casino, the Monaco Yacht Club, the Hôtel de Paris and a third of the country's acreage. Onassis's takeover of the SBM was initially welcomed by Monaco's ruler, Prince Rainier III, as the country required investment, but Onassis and Rainier's relationship had deteriorated by 1962 in the wake of the boycott of Monaco by the French President, Charles de Gaulle.

Onassis and Rainier had differing visions for Monaco. Onassis wished the country to remain a resort for an exclusive clientele, but Rainier wished to build hotels and attract a greater number of tourists. Monaco had become less attractive as a tax haven in the wake of France's actions, and Rainier urged Onassis to invest in the construction of hotels. Onassis was reluctant to invest in hotels without a guarantee from Rainier that no other competing hotel development would be permitted, but promised to build two hotels and an apartment block. Unwilling to give Onassis his guarantee, Rainier used his veto to cancel the entire hotel project, and publicly attacked SBM for their 'bad faith' on television, implicitly criticising Onassis. Rainier and Onassis remained at odds over the direction of the company for several years and in June 1966 Rainier approved a plan to create 600,000 new shares in SBM to be permanently held by the state, which reduced Onassis's stake from 52% to under a third. In the Supreme Court of Monaco the share creation was challenged by Onassis who claimed that it was unconstitutional, but the court found against him in March 1967. Following the ruling Onassis sold his holdings in SBM to the state of Monaco and left the country. According to Frank Brady in Onassis: An Extravagant Life, Onassis's words about the issue were: "We were gypped."

=== Saudi Arabia ===
During the oil boom of the 1950s Onassis was in final discussions with the King of Saudi Arabia for securing a tanker transport deal. Since the Arabian-American Oil Co. (currently, Saudi Arabian Oil Company, but still known as Aramco) had a monopoly on Saudi oil by a concession agreement, the US government was alarmed by the tanker deal. By 1954, a specific U.S. policy for Saudi Arabia, in addition to strengthening the US "special position," was to take "all appropriate measures to bring about the cancellation" of an agreement between the Saudi government and Onassis to transport Saudi oil on his tankers and "in any case, to make the agreement ineffective". [Doc. 128] The arrangement would have ended monopoly control of Saudi Arabia's oil by American oil companies, but was forestalled by the US government.

For this reason he became a target of the US government and in 1954, the FBI investigated Onassis for fraud against the U.S. government. He was charged with violating the citizenship provision of the shipping laws which require that all ships displaying the U.S. flag be owned by U.S. citizens. Onassis entered a guilty plea and paid $7 million.

It is alleged that Robert Maheu, a former FBI agent, worked for then US Vice President Richard Nixon on an operation aimed at ruining Onassis. Maheu helped the U.S. government sabotage a deal that had given Onassis a monopoly to transport Saudi oil. As part of his mission, Maheu was reportedly even allowed, if necessary, to kill Onassis. After a meeting with Maheu about Onassis, Nixon reportedly whispered, “And just remember, if it turns out we have to kill the bastard don’t do it on American soil.”

=== Whaling ===
Between 1950 and 1956, Onassis had success whaling off the west coast of South America. His first expedition made a net profit of US$4.5 million. International agreements limited the number, size and dates between which whales could be taken. The Onassis factory ship and its attendant catcher ships paid little attention to these restrictions. The Norwegian Whaling Gazette made accusations based on sailors' testimonials, such as one given by Bruno Schalaghecke, who worked on the factory ship Olympic Challenger: "Pieces of fresh meat from the 124 whales we killed yesterday still remains on the deck. Among them all, just one could be considered adult. All animals that pass within the range of the harpoon are killed in cold blood."

In 1954 the government of Peru claimed the Onassis fleet were whaling within 320 kilometres (200 mi) of the coast of Peru without permission and sent naval vessels to intercept them. Peruvian air force planes were also sent and dropped bombs that exploded near the factory ship. Most vessels in the fleet were captured by the Peruvian vessels and taken to Paita where they were interned.

The venture came to an end after the business was sold to Kyokuyo Hogei Kaisha Whaling Company, one of the biggest Japanese whaling companies, for $8.5 million. Norwegian authorities suspected the involvement of Hjalmar Schacht in Onassis's whaling enterprises. Schacht had previously been connected with Onassis's Saudi Arabian deals.

=== Olympic Airways ===
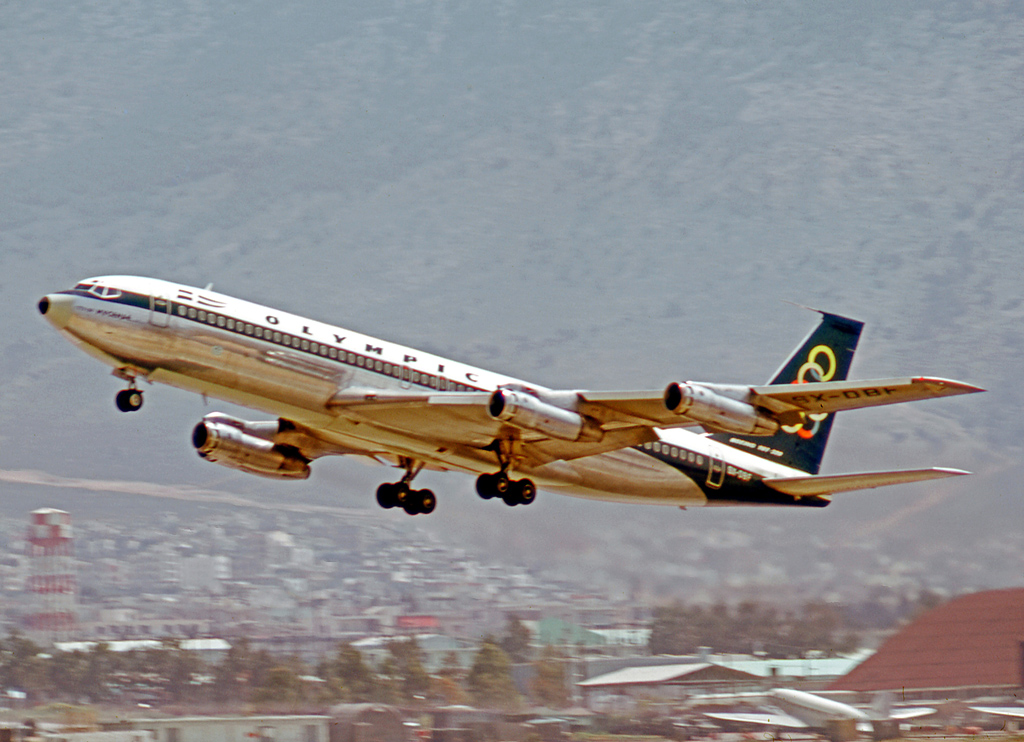
Olympic Airways Boeing 707, 1973

In 1956, Greek airlines in general faced economic difficulties, whereby companies like TAE were affected by strikes and cash shortage. The Greek government decided to give this and other companies to the private sector, and, on 30 July 1956, Onassis signed a contract granting him the operational rights to the Greek air transport industry. When Onassis heard during the negotiations that he would not be able to use the five Olympic rings in his logo due to copyright issues, he simply decided to add a sixth ring.

Operation effectively started in 1957, with one DC-4, two DC-6s, and 13 DC-3s. The following year saw 244,000 passengers transported. The agreement lasted until 10 December 1974, when a number of factors (namely, a series of strikes, shortage of passengers, fuel price increase, and a law from the new Greek government forbidding Olympic Airways to fire employees) led Onassis to terminate his contract.

Following this event, Paul Ioannidis, a high-ranking director from Olympic Airways, said the following of Onassis: "Deep down, [he] did not want to relinquish Olympic Airways. He found it flattering to own an airline. It was something in which he took deep pride. It was his accomplishment. He was married to the sea, but Olympic was his mistress. We used to say that he would spend all the money he made at sea with his mistress in the sky."

Onassis's time at the head of Olympic Airways is known as a golden era, due to investments he made in training and the acquisition of cutting-edge technology. For example, in 1959, he signed a deal with De Havilland to buy four Comet 4B jets. Onassis was also renowned for his attention to service quality, which led him to buy gold-plated utensils and candles for the dining service of the first-class section.

During 1974, the last year of Onassis's involvement with the company, Olympic Airways transported 2.5 million passengers and had a work force of 7,356 persons. At the time, his ownership of Olympic Airways distinguished Onassis as one of only two men in the world to own a private airline, the other being Howard Hughes of TWA.

=== Investments ===
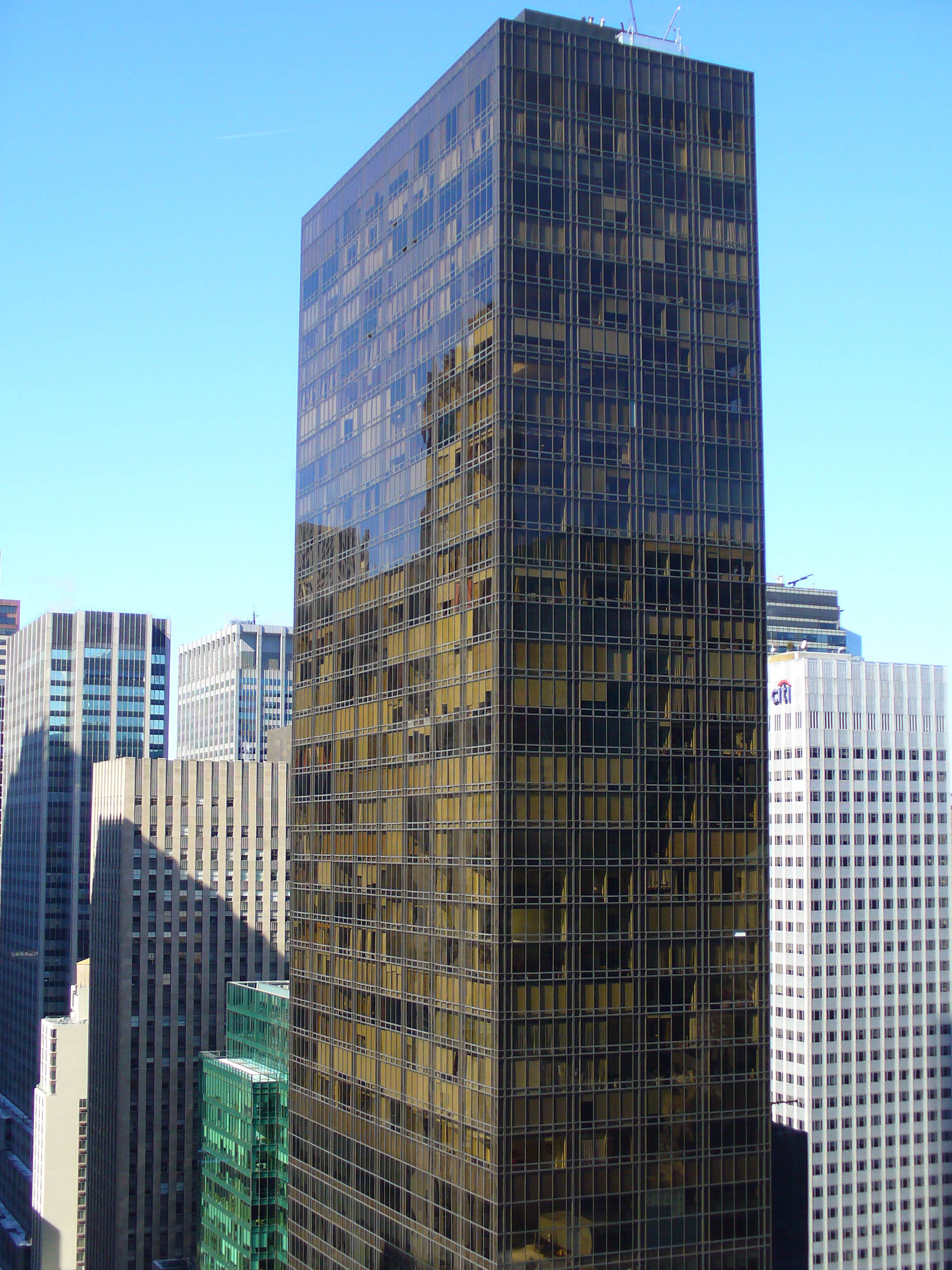
Onassis financed the construction of the Olympic Tower in New York City.

Onassis was involved in the privatization of the Greek national airline and founded the privatized Olympic Airways (today Olympic Air) in 1957. Stocks accounted for one-third of his capital, held in oil companies in the United States, the Middle East, and Venezuela. He also owned additional shares that secured his control of 95 multinational businesses in five continents. He owned gold-processing plants in Argentina and Uruguay and a large share in an airline in Latin America and $4 million worth of investments in Brazil. Also, he owned companies like Olympic Maritime and Olympic Tourist; a chemical company in Persia; apartments in Paris, London, Monte Carlo, Athens, and Acapulco; a castle in South France; the Olympic Tower (a 52-storey high-rise in Manhattan); another building in Sutton Place; Olympic Airways and Air Navigation; the island of Skorpios; the 325 ft (99.06 m) luxury yacht Christina O and, finally, deposit accounts and accounts in treasuries in 217 banks in the whole world.

=== Project Omega ===
In October 1968, amidst the Greek military junta and shortly after his marriage to Jacqueline Kennedy, Onassis announced the launch of Project Omega, a $400 million investment program that aimed to build considerable industrial infrastructure in Greece including an oil refinery and aluminum smelter. Onassis had cultivated Greek junta dictator Georgios Papadopoulos, for his assistance with the scheme, loaning Papadopoulos the use of his villa and buying dresses for his wife. The project was financially supported by the American bank First National City, and Onassis's American financial supporters eventually tired of the unfavourable terms demanded by him. The project was heavily criticized by people such as Helen Vlachos, a journalist from Athens. Another Greek Colonel, Nikolaos Makarezos, preferred a deal offered by Onassis's rival, Stavros Niarchos, and the project was eventually split between them. The failure was due partly to opposition from influential people within the military junta, such as Ioannis-Orlandos Rodinos, Deputy Minister of Economic Coordination, who opposed Onassis's offers in preference to Niarchos.

== Relationships and family ==
Onassis at age 64 in 1970

=== Athina Livanos ===
Onassis married Athina Mary "Tina" Livanos, daughter of shipping magnate Stavros G. Livanos and Arietta Zafirakis, on 28 December 1946. Livanos was 17 at the time of their marriage; Onassis was 40. Onassis and Livanos had two children, both born in New York City: a son, Alexander (1948–1973), and a daughter, Christina (1950–1988). Onassis named his legendary super-yacht, Christina O, after his daughter. To Onassis, his marriage to Athina was more than the fulfillment of his ambitions. He also felt that the marriage dealt a blow to his father-in-law and the old-money Greek traditionalists who held Onassis in very low esteem. The couple had been living separately, by the mid-1950s, with the beginning of the end of the marriage, according to Onassis' biographer, Peter Evans, coming after Livanos found Onassis in bed with a friend of hers at their home in Cap d'Antibes, the Château de la Croë. The house was then acquired by Onassis's brother-in-law and business rival Stavros Niarchos, who bought it for his wife, Eugenia Livanos, Athina's sister. Onassis and Livanos divorced in June 1960, during Onassis's well publicised affair with Maria Callas. Athina would later marry, in October 1971, her older sister Eugenia's widower Stavros Niarchos, who was her first husband Onassis's arch-rival.

=== Maria Callas ===
Onassis and legendary opera soprano Maria Callas carried on an affair, despite both being married. They met in 1957, during a party in Venice promoted by Elsa Maxwell. After this first encounter, Onassis commented to Spyros Skouras: "There [was] just a natural curiosity. After all, we were the most famous Greeks alive, in the world." Callas and Onassis both divorced their spouses but did not marry each other, although their relationship continued for many years.

=== Jacqueline Kennedy ===
Onassis was a friend of Jacqueline Kennedy, widow of U.S. President John F. Kennedy. They began a romance after John's death and the two married on 20 October 1968 on Onassis's private Greek island, Skorpios.

Before the marriage, an agreement was reached between Onassis and Ted Kennedy, Jacqueline's former brother-in-law. In the agreement, Jacqueline received a total US $3 million from Onassis, plus US $1 million for each of her two children, to compensate for the US $150,000 she would have otherwise received from the Kennedy family trust, which she lost by remarrying. Upon Onassis's death, she would also receive US $150,000 each year from his estate for the rest of her life.

During their marriage, the Onassises inhabited six residences: his apartment in Paris (88 Avenue Foch), her 15-room apartment at 1040 Fifth Avenue in New York City, her horse farm in New Jersey, his house in Athens, his house on Skorpios and his yacht Christina O.

== Death and legacy ==
Onassis died at the age of 69 on 15 March 1975 at the American Hospital of Paris in Neuilly-sur-Seine, France, of pneumonia following gall bladder surgery the previous month. The pneumonia was particularly exacerbated by the cortisone he was taking for his myasthenia gravis from which he had suffered in the last years of his life. Onassis is buried on his island of Skorpios in Greece, alongside his son, Alexander, and his sister, Artemis.

Onassis' will established a charitable foundation in memory of his son, the Alexander S. Onassis Public Benefit Foundation, which received 45% of Onassis's estate. The remainder of his estate was left to his daughter, Christina. Christina's share has since passed to her only child, Athina, at the time making Athina one of the wealthiest women in the world.

Jacqueline Onassis also received her share of the estate, settling for a reported $10 million ($26 million according to other sources), which was negotiated by her brother-in-law Ted Kennedy. This amount would reportedly grow to several hundred million under the financial stewardship of her companion, Maurice Tempelsman. After Aristotle's death, Christina had settled with Jacqueline for $25 million in exchange for her not contesting Onassis's will.

The Boeing 727 that transported Onassis's remains was later purchased for US$100,000 by an American electrical engineer and turned into an unconventional private residence in Hillsboro, Oregon.

== See also ==
- Onassis Foundation
- Greek shipping
- Stavros Niarchos
