= Tina Onassis Niarchos =

English-born socialite and shipping heiress

Tina Niarchos
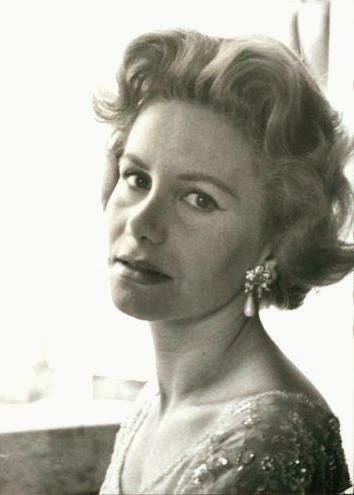
- Born: Athina Mary Livanos; 19 March 1929; Kensington, London, England
- Died: 10 October 1974 (aged 45); Paris, France
- Burial place: Bois-de-Vaux Cemetery, Lausanne, Switzerland
- Occupation: socialite
- Title: Marchioness of Blandford
- Spouses: Aristotle Onassis (m. 1946; div. 1960) John Spencer-Churchill, Marquess of Blandford (m. 1961; div. 1971) Stavros Niarchos (m. 1971)
- Children: Alexander Onassis; Christina Onassis
- Parents: Stavros G. Livanos; Arietta Zafirakis
- Relatives: Athina Onassis (granddaughter)

Athina Mary "Tina" Onassis Niarchos (née Livanos; Greek: Αθηνά "Τίνα" Λιβανού, pronounced [aθiˈna ˈtina livaˈnu]; 19 March 1929 – 10 October 1974) was an English-born Greek-French socialite and shipping heiress. She was second daughter of the Greek shipping magnate Stavros G. Livanos and Arietta Zafirakis. Niarchos was also the first wife of Aristotle Onassis, and later married her older sister Eugenia's widower and Greek shipping tycoon, Stavros Niarchos, who was her first husband Onassis's arch-rival. She was also an elder sister of George Stavros Livanos.

== Marriages and family ==
She was married three times. Her husbands were:

1. Aristotle Onassis (28 December 1946 – 1960); with him she had two children, Alexander Onassis (1948–1973) and Christina Onassis (1950–1988). She divorced him upon discovering that he was having an affair with the opera singer Maria Callas.
2. John Spencer-Churchill, Marquess of Blandford (23 October 1961 – March 1971), later 11th Duke of Marlborough.
3. Stavros Niarchos (21 October 1971 – 1974), her sister Eugenia's widower.

After her divorce from Aristotle Onassis, she resumed using her maiden name, Livanos, until her marriage to Spencer-Churchill.

Her son with Onassis, Alexander Onassis, died at the age of 24 on 23 January 1973, as a result of injuries sustained a day earlier during an airplane crash in Athens.

Athina Niarchos died on 10 October 1974 in the Hôtel de Chanaleilles, the Parisian mansion that she shared with her husband. Her death was officially ruled by pathologists as having resulted from an acute edema of the lung, but has also been attributed to her suffering a drug overdose. She was buried next to her sister at the Bois-de-Vaux Cemetery in Lausanne, Switzerland.

Her daughter, Christina Onassis, sued Stavros Niarchos, her mother's widower, for her mother's estimated US$250 million (in 1974 dollars) estate, claiming the marriage should be annulled by Greek law. Christina later withdrew the lawsuit and Niarchos returned all of his wife's money as well as her jewelry, artwork and other personal effects to Christina.

Her only living descendant is her namesake granddaughter, Athina Onassis, Christina's daughter.
