= Stavros Niarchos =

Greek businessman (1909–1996)

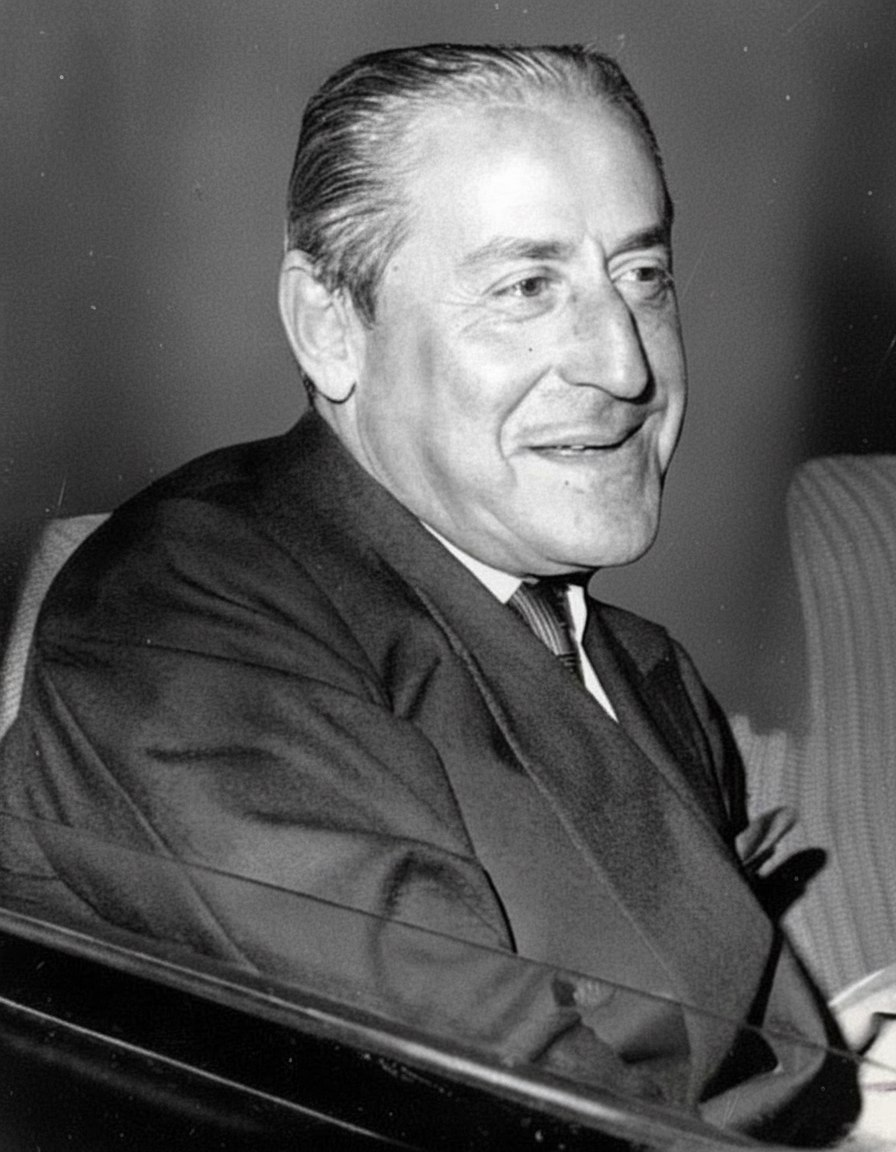
- Niarchos in 1967
- Born: Stavros Spyros Niarchos; 3 July 1909; Athens, Kingdom of Greece
- Died: 15 April 1996 (aged 86); Zürich, Switzerland
- Education: University of Athens
- Occupation: Shipping tycoon
- Spouses: Helen Sporides (m. 1930; div. 1931); Melpomene Capparis (m. 1939; div. 1947); Eugenia Livanos (m. 1947; div. 1965); Charlotte McDonnell Ford (m. 1965; div. 1967); Athina Mary Livanos (m. 1971; died 1974)
- Children: Maria; Philip; Spyros; Konstantin; Elena

Stavros Spyros Niarchos (Greek: Σταύρος Σπύρος Νιάρχος, pronounced [ˈstavros ˈspiros ˈɲarxos]; 3 July 1909 – 15 April 1996) was a Greek billionaire shipping tycoon. Starting in 1952, he had the world's biggest supertankers built for his fleet. Propelled by both the Suez Crisis and increasing demand for oil, he and rival Aristotle Onassis became giants in global petroleum shipping.

Niarchos was also a thoroughbred horse breeder and racer, several times the leading owner and number one on the French breed list.

== Early life ==
Niarchos was born in Athens to a wealthy family, the son of Spyros Niarchos and his wife, Eugenie Koumantaros, a rich heiress, both born in the village of Vamvakou in the Peloponnese.

His parents were naturalized United States citizens who had owned a department store in Buffalo, New York, before returning to Greece, three months prior to his birth. They returned to Buffalo for a brief time, and the young Stavros attended the Nardin Academy grammar school. They returned, permanently, to Greece, and Stavros studied in the city's best private school, before starting university. He studied law at the University of Athens, after which he went to work for his maternal uncles in the Koumantaros family's grain business. During this period, he became involved in shipping, by convincing his uncles their firm would be more profitable, if it owned its own ships.

== Shipping career ==
Niarchos was a naval officer in World War II, during which time part of the trade fleet he had developed with his uncle was destroyed. He used about two million dollars in insurance settlement to build a new fleet. His most famous asset was the yacht Atlantis, currently known as Issham al Baher, after having been gifted to King Fahd of Saudi Arabia.

He then founded Niarchos Ltd., an international shipping company that, at one time, operated more than 80 tankers worldwide. He and Aristotle Onassis were great shipping rivals. In 1952, high-capacity oil supertankers were built for the competing Niarchos and Onassis fleets, who both claimed to own the largest tanker in the world. In 1955, Vickers Armstrongs Shipbuilders Ltd launched the 30,708 GRT SS Spyros Niarchos. Then the world's largest supertanker, it was named after Niarchos' second son, Spyros, born earlier that year.

In 1956, the Suez Canal Crisis considerably increased the demand for the type of large-tonnage ships that Niarchos owned. Business flourished, and he became a billionaire.

== Personal life ==
=== Marriages ===
Niarchos was married five times:

- To Helen Sporides in 1930, a daughter of Admiral Constantine Sporides, lasted one year.
- To Melpomene Capparis in 1939, a widow of a Greek diplomat, whom he divorced in 1947.
- To Eugenia Livanos in 1947, a daughter of shipping magnate Stavros G. Livanos. They divorced in 1965; she died in 1970 at the age of 44, after an overdose of barbiturates. During this marriage he had an affair with Pamela Churchill (later Pamela Harriman).
- To Charlotte Ford in 1965, daughter of tycoon automaker Henry Ford II, in Mexico. Their daughter Elena Anne Ford was born six months later. When the marriage ended in divorce the following year Niarchos returned to his former wife, Eugenia. No remarriage was necessary, since the couple's 1965 Mexican divorce had not been recognised by Greek law.
- To Athina Mary Livanos, his third wife Eugenia's sister, in 1971. Then the Marchioness of Blandford, Athina had been the first wife of Aristotle Onassis. Her death in 1974 was either caused by an acute edema of the lung or a drug overdose.

From the late 1970s until his death, he was linked to Princess Firyal of Jordan. He was also said to be linked to Princess Maria Gabriella of Savoy.

=== Children ===
Niarchos had two daughters and three sons:

- By his third wife, Eugenia Livanos, whom he never divorced under Greek law:
  - Maria Isabella Niarchos, a breeder of thoroughbreds. Married to Stephane Gouazé. Mother of two children: Artur Gouazé and Maia Gouazé
  - Philip, art collector. Married in 1984 to his third wife Victoria Guinness (b. 1960), who is the younger daughter of Patrick Benjamin Guinness and Baroness Dolores von Fürstenberg-Herdringen. They had four children together: Stavros Niarchos (b. 1985, husband of Dasha Zhukova), Eugenie Niarchos (b. 1986), Theodorakis "Theo" Niarchos (b. 1991), Electra Niarchos (b. 1995).
  - Spyros (b. 1955) married 1987 (divorced 1999) the Hon. Daphne Guinness (b. 1967), daughter of Jonathan Guinness, 3rd Baron Moyne by his second wife Suzanne Lisney, and had three children: Nicolas Stavros Niarchos (b. 1989, husband of Malù dalla Piccola), Alexis Spyros Niarchos (b. 1991) and Ines Niarchos (b. 1995). Spyros is a good friend of Prince Ernst August of Hanover, and was best man at his wedding to Princess Caroline of Monaco.
  - Konstantin, or Constantine Niarchos (1962–1999); married firstly 1987 (divorced) Princess Alessandra Borghese, no issue; married secondly the Brazilian artist Sylvia Martins, no issue. He was the first Greek to scale Mount Everest. At his death of a massive cocaine overdose in 1999, The Independent (UK) reported he had been left one billion dollars as his share of his late father's estate.
- By his fourth wife; Charlotte Ford:
  - Elena Ford (b. 1966) married firstly 1991 (divorced) to Stanley Jozef Olender, married secondly 1996 (divorced) to Joseph Daniel Rippolone, married thirdly 2022 to Mitchell Seldin. With issue.

== Death ==
Niarchos died on 15 April 1996 in Zürich. He is buried in the family tomb in the Bois-de-Vaux Cemetery in Lausanne. His fortune was estimated to be worth $12 billion at the time of his death. He left 20% of his fortune to a charitable trust to be established in his name and the remainder to his three sons and daughter Maria, by his marriage to Greek shipping heiress, Eugenia Livanos, a nephew, and a great nephew. He notably excluded from his will Elena Ford, his daughter by his ex-wife, heiress and socialite Charlotte M. Ford. Elena sued the estate in both Swiss and Greek courts for her one-tenth share, estimated to be worth £700 million.

== Thoroughbred horse racing ==
Niarchos began investing in thoroughbred horse racing in the early 1950s and won his first stakes race with Pipe of Peace at the Middle Park Stakes. After leaving the business for roughly two decades, he came back in the 1970s and eventually put together a highly successful stable of racehorses that competed in France and the UK. He acquired the Haras de Fresnay-le-Buffard horse breeding farm in Neuvy-au-Houlme, France and Oak Tree Farm in Lexington, Kentucky, where, in 1984, he bred his most successful horse, Miesque. Niarchos was the leading owner in France twice (1983, 1984) and topped the breeders' list there three times (1989, 1993, 1994). His prize horses were all trained by François Boutin, whose skill was a vital element of Niarchos' success in the field.

After his death, in 1996, his daughter, Maria Niarchos-Gouazé, took charge of racing operations. She, too, was successful, winning France's most important race, the Prix de l'Arc de Triomphe, in 2004 with her colt Bago, and her filly, Divine Proportions, capturing the 2005 Prix de Diane by winning 9 out of her 10 races, until a serious tendon injury cut the horse's racing career short.

== See also ==
- Stavros Niarchos Foundation

== Bibliography ==
- Corlett, Ewan (1981). The Revolution in Merchant Shipping 1950–1980. The Ship. Series editor: Basil Greenhill. London: Her Majesty's Stationery Office on behalf of the National Maritime Museum. ISBN 0-11-290320-7.
- "Biggest Tanker". Time. 22 February 1954. Archived from the original on 14 May 2007.
- "An International Marriage". Time. 24 December 1965. Archived from the original on 14 May 2009.
- "Milestones". Time. 29 April 1996. Archived from the original on 15 February 2009.
