= Eugenia Livanos =

Greek socialite

Eugenia Livanos-Niarchos (née Livanos; Greek: Ευγενία Λιβανού, pronounced [evʝeˈnia livaˈnu]; 1927 – 4 May 1970) was a shipping heiress and the third wife of Greek shipping tycoon Stavros Niarchos.

She was the daughter of shipping magnate Stavros G. Livanos and his wife Arietta Zafirakis. Eugenia and Stavros Niarchos married in 1947. The couple had four children, Philip, Spyros, Konstantinos and Maria. Her younger sister was Athina Livanos, the first wife of Aristotle Onassis. Athina then married Stavros Niarchos, Eugenia's widower, in October 1971.

On 4 May 1970, Eugenia was found dead at home on the Niarchos family's private island Spetsopoula, having died from an overdose of barbiturates. An inquiry into the circumstances of her death exonerated her husband.

She is buried in the family tomb of the Niarchos family at the Bois-de-Vaux Cemetery in Lausanne, Switzerland.
