= Robert Cohen =

Robert Cohen may refer to:

- Robert Cohen (writer) (born 1963), Canadian comedy writer
- Robert Cohen (novelist) (born 1957), American novelist and short fiction writer
- Robert Cohen (playwright) (1938–2024), American university professor, theatre director, playwright, and drama critic
- Robert Cohen (boxer) (1930–2022), French boxer and bantamweight champion
- Robert Cohen (cellist) (born 1959), British cellist
- Robert B. Cohen (1925–2012), American businessman and founder of Hudson News
- Robert Donald Cohen (1933–2014), British physician
- Robert Waley Cohen (1877–1952), British industrialist and leader of Anglo-Jewry
- Robert Cohen (Germanist) (born 1941), film director from Switzerland
- Rob Cohen (born 1949), American film director, producer and writer (XXX and The Fast and the Furious)
- Bobby Cohen (born 1970), American film producer (The Cider House Rules and Memoirs of a Geisha)
- Robert J. Cohen (born 1948), American executive director
- Robert Stephan Cohen (born 1939), American divorce attorney
- Robert E. Cohen (born 1947), American chemical engineer
- Rob Cohen (record producer), American record producer

== See also ==
- Robert Cohn (fl. 1980s–2000s), Canadian businessman
- Cohen (surname)
