= 2009 Global Champions Tour =

Show jumping competition series

The 2009 Global Champions Tour was the 4th edition of the Global Champions Tour (GCT), an international show jumping competition series. The series was primarily held in Europe, with one event and the final hosted outside the continent. All competitions were endowed with at least €285,000. All GCT events were held as CSI 5*.

The competitions were held between May 2 and August 23 in 2009. The final was held in Doha, Qatar from November 11 to 15, 2009.

The champion of the Global Champions Tour Final of 2009 was Michel Robert of France on Kellemoi de Pepita.

== Competitions ==
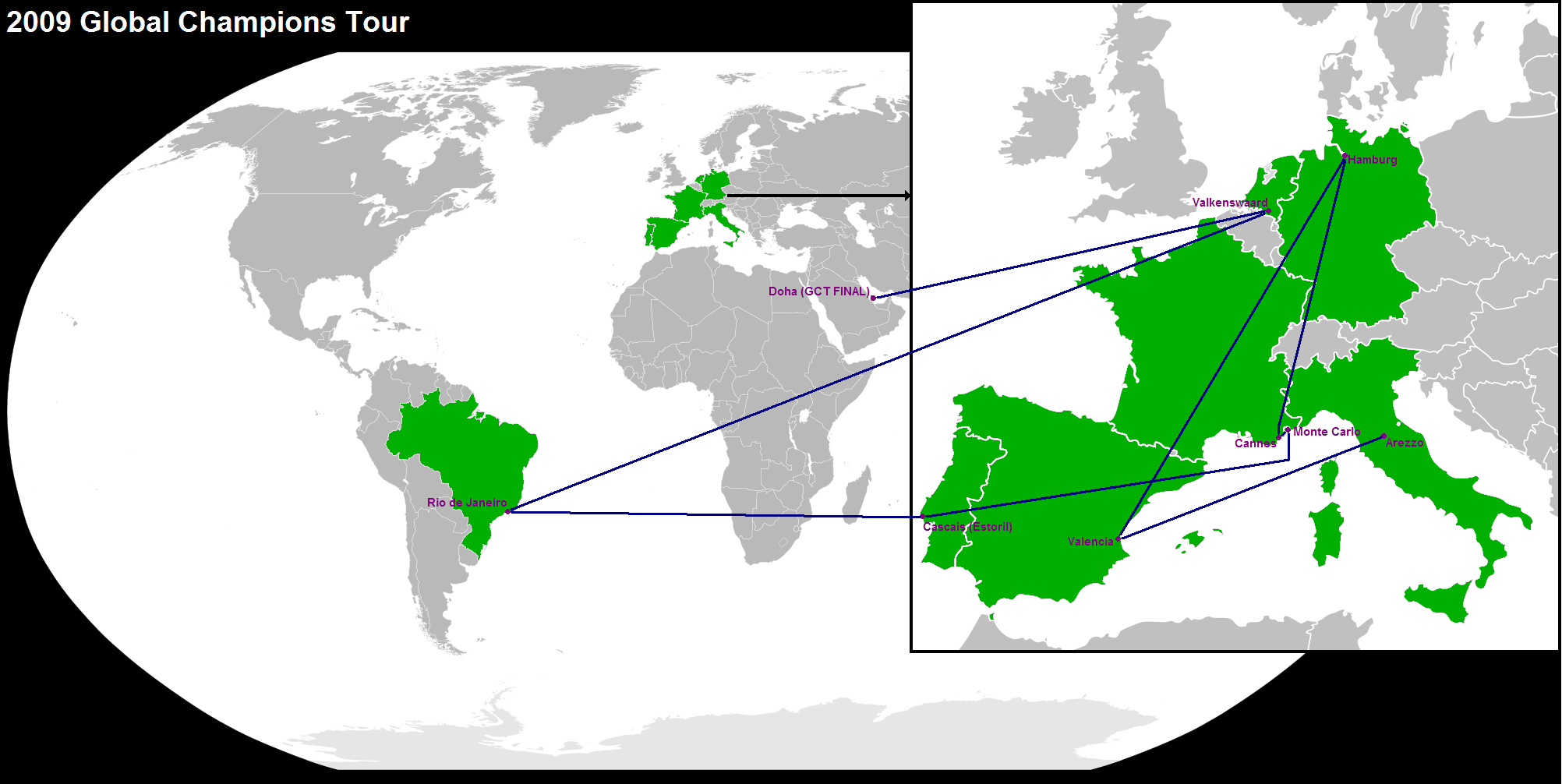
competitions of the 2009 Global Champions Tour

All competitions are held as competitions over two rounds against the clock, with one jump-off against the clock.

The placement of riders not qualified for the jump-off is based on the number of penalties in both rounds and the time in the second round. The placement of the riders, who are not qualified for the second round, is determined by the number of penalties and the time of the first round. Competitors not qualified for the second round are placed behind those who compete in it.

=== 1st Competition: Global Champions Tour of Italy ===
April 2, 2009 to April 5, 2009 - Arezzo, Italy
Competition: Saturday, April 4, 2009 - Start: 5:30 pm, prize money: 285 000 €

	Rider	Horse	Round 1		Round 2		Jump-off		scoring points
	Rider	Horse	Penalties	Time (s)	Penalties	Time (s)	Penalties	Time (s)	scoring points
1	(Germany) Marco Kutscher	Cash	0	-	0	-	0	34.55	20
2	(France) Michel Robert	Kellemoi de Pepita	0	-	0	-	0	35.04	18
3	(Brazil) Bernardo Alves	Chupa Chup	0	-	0	-	0	35.60	16

(Top 3 of 49 Competitors)

=== 2nd Competition: Global Champions Tour of Spain ===
May 8, 2009 to May 10, 2009 - Museo de las Ciencias Príncipe Felipe, Ciutat de les Arts i les Ciències, Valencia, Spain
Competition: Saturday, May 9, 2009 - Start: 4:00 pm, prize money: €285 000

	Rider	Horse	Round 1		Round 2		Jump-off		scoring points
	Rider	Horse	Penalties	Time (s)	Penalties	Time (s)	Penalties	Time (s)	scoring points
1	(United Kingdom) John Whitaker	Peppermill	0	-	0	72.55			20
2	(Sweden) Rolf-Göran Bengtsson	Ninja	0	-	1	74.46			18
3	(Australia) Edwina Alexander	Itot du Chateau	0	-	4	65.36			16

(Top 3 of 50 Competitors)

=== 3rd Competition: Global Champions Tour of Germany ===
May 21, 2009 to May 24, 2009 - Hamburg (German show jumping and dressage derby), Germany
Competition: Saturday, May 23, 2009 - Start: 1:30 pm, prize money: €285 000

	Rider	Horse	Round 1		Round 2		Jump-off		scoring points
	Rider	Horse	Penalties	Time (s)	Penalties	Time (s)	Penalties	Time (s)	scoring points
1	(Brazil) Bernardo Alves	Chupa Chup	0	-	0	-	0	51.05	20
2	(Germany) Carsten-Otto Nagel	Corradina	0	-	0	-	0	51.25	18
3	(France) Roger-Yves Bost	Ideal de la Loge	0	-	0	-	0	52.08	16

(Top 3 of 48 Competitors)

=== 4th Competition: Global Champions Tour of France ===
June 11, 2009 to June 13, 2009 - Cannes, France
Competition: Saturday, June 13, 2009 - Start: 6:00 pm, prize money: €285 000

	Rider	Horse	Round 1		Round 2		Jump-off		scoring points
	Rider	Horse	Penalties	Time (s)	Penalties	Time (s)	Penalties	Time (s)	scoring points
1	(France) Roger-Yves Bost	Ideal de la Loge	0	-	0	52.51			20
2	(Germany) Daniel Deußer	Aboyeur W	0	-	1	54.87			18
3	(United Kingdom) Ben Maher	Robin Hood W	0	-	1	56.37			16

(Top 3 of 44 Competitors)

=== 5th Competition: Global Champions Tour of Monaco ===
June 25, 2009 to June 27, 2009 - shore at the marina "Port Hercule", Monte Carlo, Monaco
Competition: Saturday, June 27, 2009 - Start: 6:00 pm, prize money: €285 000

	Rider	Horse	Round 1		Round 2		Jump-off		scoring points
	Rider	Horse	Penalties	Time (s)	Penalties	Time (s)	Penalties	Time (s)	scoring points
1	(United States) Richard Spooner	Cristallo	0	-	0	-	0	35.46	20
2	(Brazil) Alvaro de Miranda Neto	Picolien Zeldenrust	0	-	0	-	0	36.85	18
3	(Brazil) Rodrigo Pessoa	Let's Fly	0	-	0	-	0	37.20	16

(Top 3 of 45 competitors)

=== 6th Competition: Global Champions Tour of Portugal ===
July 9, 2009 to July 11, 2009 - Hipódromo Manuel Possolo, Cascais near Estoril, Portugal
Competition: Saturday, July 11, 2009 - Start: 7:00 pm, prize money: €400 000 (show jumping grand prix with the highest prize money in Europe)

	Rider	Horse	Round 1		Round 2		Jump-off		scoring points
	Rider	Horse	Penalties	Time (s)	Penalties	Time (s)	Penalties	Time (s)	scoring points
1	(Netherlands) Leopold van Asten	Santana B	0	-	0	-	0	44.06	20
2	(Switzerland) Clarissa Crotta	West Side van Meerputhoeve	0	-	0	-	4	40.95	18
3	(Portugal) Luciana Diniz	As-Taro	0	-	0	-	8	44.97	16

(Top 3 of 45 competitors)

=== 7th Competition: Global Champions Tour of Brasil ===
July 31, 2009 - August 2, 2009 - equestrian facility of the Sociedade Hípica Brasileira, Rio de Janeiro (Athina Onassis International Horse Show), Brazil
Competition: Saturday, August 1, 2009 - Start: 1:45 pm, prize money: €285 000

	Rider	Horse	Round 1		Round 2		Jump-off		scoring points
	Rider	Horse	Penalties	Time (s)	Penalties	Time (s)	Penalties	Time (s)	scoring points
1	(Italy) Gianni Govoni	Joyau d'Opal	0	-	0	-	0	36.15	20
2	(Canada) Eric Lamaze	Hickstead	0	-	0	-	0	36.51	18
3	(Germany) Marco Kutscher	Cornet Obolensky	0	-	0	-	0	37.40	16

(Top 3 of 42 Competitors)

=== 8th Competition: Global Champions Tour of the Netherlands ===
August 20, 2009 - August 23, 2009 - Valkenswaard, Netherlands
Competition: Saturday, August 22, 2009 - Start: 1:45 pm, prize money: €285 000

	Rider	Horse	Round 1		Round 2		Jump-off		scoring points
	Rider	Horse	Penalties	Time (s)	Penalties	Time (s)	Penalties	Time (s)	scoring points
1	(Australia) Edwina Alexander	Itot du Chateau	0	-	0	-	0	35.49	20
2	(Germany) Meredith Michaels-Beerbaum	Shutterfly	0	-	0	-	0	35.81	18
3	(France) Michel Robert	Kellemoi de Pepita	0	-	0	-	0	35.95	16

(Top 3 of 50 Competitors)

== Global Champions Tour Final ==
=== Overall standings (after 8 competitions) ===
	Rider	1st Competition	2nd Competition	3rd Competition	4th Competition	5th Competition	6th Competition	7th Competition	8th Competition	scoring points (Total)
1	(Australia) Edwina Alexander	10	16	(0)	(0)	9	0	10	20	65
2	(Germany) Meredith Michaels-Beerbaum	0	9	14	11	-	10	-	18	62
3	(Belgium) Patrick Mc Entee	4	10	11	12	12	12	-	(0)	61
4	(Germany) Marco Kutscher	20	0	-	-	0	3	16	13	52
5	(France) Michel Robert	18	15	-	-	-	-	-	16	49

(Top 5), 6 results count for the final standing

=== Final ===
November 11, 2009 to November 14, 2009 - Doha, Qatar

==== First round ====
Competition: Thursday, November 12, 2009 - Start: 9:00 pm, prize money: €50 000

	Rider	Horse	Penalties	Time (s)
1	(Canada) Eric Lamaze	Hickstead	0	72.25
2	(Brazil) Bernardo Alves	Chupa Chup	0	73.13
3	(Netherlands) Albert Zoer	Okidoki	0	75.63

(Top 3 of 25 Competitors)

==== Final result after second round and jump-off ====
Competition: Saturday, November 14, 2009 - Start: 8:00 pm, prize money: €900 000

	Rider	Horse			Jump-off	
	Rider	Horse	Penalties	Time (s)	Penalties	Time (s)
1	(France) Michel Robert	Kellemoi de Pepita	0	-	0	49.76
2	(Belgium) Jos Lansink	Valentina van't Heike	0	-	0	49.89
3	(Brazil) Alvaro de Miranda Neto	Picolien Zeldenrust	0	-	4	46.52
4	(Germany) Ulrich Kirchhoff	Carino	0	-	4	46.91
5	(Republic of Ireland) Denis Lynch	All Inclusive NRW	1	88.92		

(Top 5 of 18 Competitors)
