= Álvaro de Miranda Neto =

Brazilian equestrian (born 1973)

Álvaro de Miranda
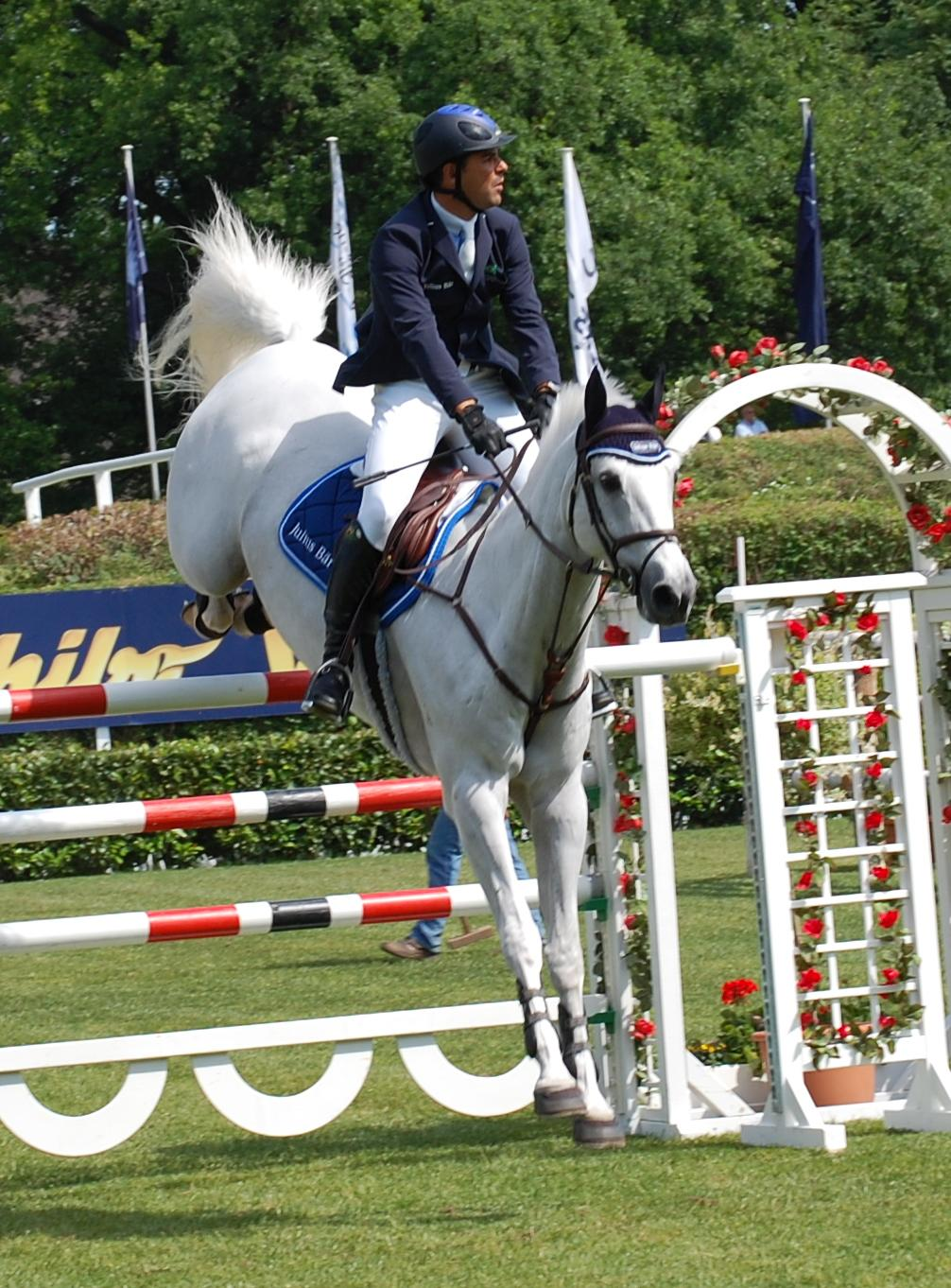
- Miranda with Ashleigh Drossel Dan

Personal information
- Born: Álvaro Affonso de Miranda Neto; 5 February 1973 (age 53) São Paulo, Brazil
- Occupations: Brazilian Olympic equestrian athlete Owner, AD Sport Horses
- Height: 1.87 m (6 ft 2 in)
- Spouses: Athina Onassis (m. 2005; div. 2017) Denize Severo (m. 2018)
- Children: 3
Medal record
Equestrian
Representing Brazil
Olympic Games
Bronze medal – third place	1996 Atlanta	Team jumping
Bronze medal – third place	2000 Sydney	Team jumping

Álvaro Affonso de Miranda Neto (born 5 February 1973), more commonly known as Álvaro de Miranda or "Doda" Miranda, is an Olympic-class Brazilian show jumping rider. He was married to Athina Onassis. He is president of the organizing committee behind the Athina Onassis International Horse Show, which debuted in 2007 as the fifth stage of the Global Champions Tour in São Paulo. In 2008, the AOIHS-São Paulo event was the final phase of the tour. For the tour in 2009, the host city of the AOIHS was Rio de Janeiro.

== Early life and family ==
Miranda is the son of businessman Ricardo Miranda and his first wife, psychologist Elizabeth "Beth" Pires de Castro Miranda.

Doda grew up in Brazil with full siblings Anna Luiza and Paulo Fernando from his father's first marriage and half-siblings Beatriz and Ricardo from his second. In 1983, while he was still very young, he began training for competitive show jumping at Nelson Pessoa's prestigious riding school in Belgium. Miranda has a Bachelor of Business Administration degree from Rio Branco College. He studied for one year at a university in Brussels, then left school to devote himself fully to his sport. He told Isto é Gente (a Brazilian magazine) in February 2003 that his mother was disappointed with this decision at first, but now he has no regrets because he has been doing what he loves. At that time, his sponsors (including Visa and Audi) paid for his horses.

== Career ==
Miranda is a four-time Olympic rider and two-time Olympic medalist. His Brazilian team won bronze medals at the 2000 Summer and 1996 Summer Olympic Games. At both the Atlanta and Sydney Games, he rode "Aspen Joter," a stallion who was born in 1985. He partnered himself with "Countdown" (b. 1992) for Brazil at the 2004 Summer Olympics, and again at the 2008 Summer Olympics. He also participated at the 2003 Pan American Games.

He is a FEI-class, grand-prix level rider. Every year since 1998, he has competed in the FEI World Equestrian Games.

In June 2009, Miranda ranked #2 in the Monte Carlo grand prix of the Global Champions Tour. He ranked 18th, with 32 points, leading into the GCT final in Doha, Qatar, in November 2009. His performance in Doha ( 11–14 November 2009) was unremarkable at first, but he gained third place in the final, an event with a purse of €300,000.

In November 2009, Miranda (on AD Picolien Zeldenrust) was the third-place winner of the Global Champions Tour final in Doha. He actually had the fastest time, but his penalty placed him behind Michel Robert (first place) and Jos Lansink (second place).

In December 2009, Miranda (riding AD Peanuts) won the Salon du Cheval – Ceneca Trophy at the Gucci Masters in Villepinte, just north of Paris.

=== Horses ===
With his ex-wife, Athina Onassis de Miranda, he owns the AD Sport Horses company, which breeds and trains horses and is based at Haras de Ligny, the compound owned by the father-son team of Nelson and Rodrigo Pessoa in Fleurus, Belgium. In December 2009, at the Gucci Masters, Miranda confirmed that the company was moving to his and his wife's new property in the Netherlands early in 2010.

List of horses

- AD Picolien Zeldenrust (b. 1997, Dutch Warmblood chestnut mare);
- AD Chatwin (b. 1993, bay gelding, Holsteiner, retired after leg injury in July 2008);
- AD Ornella (b. 1999, sold in December 2009 to Hernan Crespo via Jan Tops);
- AD Norson (b. 2001, chestnut stallion);
- AD Como II (b. 1997, bay gelding, Holsteiner);
- AD Peanuts (b. 1994, chestnut mare);
- AD Untouchable (b. 2001, grey stallion);
- AD Ashleigh Drossel Dan (b. 1998 grey gelding, Hannoverian)Australian bred.

== Personal life ==
His first relationship with Cibele Dorsa, a fashion model, produced daughter Viviane on 1 January 2000. Cibele Dorsa had a son, Fernando Dorsa Oliva, from a previous relationship.

In December 2005, he married Athina Hélène Roussel (granddaughter of Greek shipping magnate Aristotle Onassis), who legally changed her name to Athina Onassis de Miranda the following year. Miranda's longtime friend and fellow jumping rider Rodrigo Pessoa served as best man at the wedding.

Cibele Dorsa committed suicide on 26 March 2011 at 36. Her suicide-note publication in Brazil's gossip magazine Caras was forbidden by Miranda's attorneys due to mentions relating him to Dorsa's suicide.

His marriage to Athina Onassis ended in 2016, following a legal separation. By the beginning of 2018, their divorce was finalized.

In September 2018, he married Denize Severo, with whom he has two children: Dodinha and Giulia Severo de Miranda.

== See also ==
- List of Olympic medalists in equestrian
