= Michail P. Petropouleas =

Greek Army general

Michail P. Petropouleas (or Michael P. Petropouleas/Greek: Μιχαήλ Π. Πετροπουλέας, 1911–2010) was born in the Maniot village of Aghios Nikon, Greece and was a Major General (Signal Corps, OF-7) of the Hellenic Army. He developed a significant military activity with participation in the World War II and he was awarded with all decorations, commendations and medals provided for his rank. After his military discharge, he was chief executive officer (CEO) and chairman of the Hellenic Telecommunications Organisation from 1974 to 1976.

== Education & Educational Work ==
Following his graduation from the High School of Areopoli, Mani, Greece in 1929, Michail Petropouleas pursued higher military and academic studies. Specifically, he studied at the Hellenic Army Academy, the Military School of Transmissions, the Infantry School, the Supreme Joint War College, the Hellenic National Defence College as well as the Panteion University.

He was appointed as a professor at the Hellenic Army Academy and taught at the Hellenic National Defence College for a two- year term.

== Military career ==
Petropouleas served his country from various positions, to the point of holding executive positions in the Army. He was named Infantry Second Lieutenant (Engineer, OF-1) on 4 May 1937, and then he commanded several important Units.

During the Period of Peace he was assigned as:

Commander of a Company, Commander of a Battalion, Commander of a Corps Officers Military Academy (Signals Arm), Commander of a School of Infantry Officers (Signals Arm), Commander of a Division, Director of Public Relations at the Hellenic Army General Staff and he also assigned as Assistant Chief of Staff of the 1st Army Corps at the NATO Headquarters in Izmir, Turkey.

During the Period of War he was assigned as:

Commander of the XVIIth Company (Signals Arm) in Albania (Lesnitsa, Trebeshina, Kleisoura, Battle of Hill 731, Pogradec), hostage in Italian concentration camps and volunteer in the Sacred Band. On 7 February 1941 he was wounded on a hill in the straits of Kleisoura, but continued to fight with self-denial.

For his ethos, bravery and services to his country, Petropouleas was twice honoured with the Medal for Outstanding Deeds, with War Crosses C' and B' Class, with the Gold Cross with Sword, with Medals of Military Merit C' and B' Class, with the Gold Medal of Valour, with the Medal of the Greek-Italian War, with the Medal of the Middle East and with the Cross of the Second Order of the Phoenix.

== Hostage-taking ==
On 6 October 1942 he was arrested by the Italian occupiers in his village, Aghios Nikon (Outer Mani), and was taken hostage in Italy. He held the rank of Lieutenant (Engineer, OF-1).

During his hostage in Italy, he lived in various concentration camps (Bari, Parma, Piacenza) in squalid conditions, until 12 September 1943, when the last camp was disbanded. This happened four days after 8 September 1943, when an armistice was signed between General Pietro Badoglio and the Allies.

Then, Petropouleas continued to undergo new hardships and challenges that forced him to live in hiding in the forests and villages of the Apennine mountains of northern Italy. On 18 November 1943, and after difficulties, he arrived in Rome, continuing to live in hiding for eight (8) months from house to house, until the entry of the Allies into the Italian capital, on 4 June 1944.

On 6 July 1944 he was taken by the Allies, along with other hostages, to a camp in Naples.

On 12 July 1944 the British placed the hostages in a camp in Taranto, where the Italian Fleet Naval Base was located.

Afterwards, Petropouleas boarded a British destroyer heading to the Middle East, where the exiled Greek Government resided.

Indeed, on 22 July 1944, he arrived to Alexandria, Egypt, and later in the evening he reached Cairo by train.

On 23 August 1944 he was transferred to the Military Training Camp of Ismailia.

On 24 August 1944 he arrived in Nahariya, near Haifa, Israel, and volunteered as Private in the Sacred Band. He received an extremely rigorous training as a paratrooper. He remained in the Sacred Band until its dissolution.

In September 1944, he sailed from Nahariya, heading to Greece.

On 14 October 1944 he returned to his country, via Kythira and Poros, and landed safely in Passalimani, Piraeus.

Lastly, he took part in several military operations against the Germans on the island of Milos (1944).

== Anti-dictatorship action ==
Petropouleas, as a deeply democratic man, openly condemned the military coup of 21 April 1967 in Greece. This attitude resulted in his early military discharge with the rank of Colonel from the Junta of the Colonels, within the very first month of the imposition of the military dictatorship.

However, after the fall of the Junta and the restoration of Democracy, Petropouleas was retroactively restored to the rank of Major General (Signal Corps, OF-7).

== CEO of the Hellenic Telecommunications Organisation (ΟΤΕ) ==
After successfully completed his career in the Hellenic Army, Michail Petropouleas was appointed as the chief executive officer (CEO) of the Hellenic Telecommunications Organisation from 13 September 1974 to 20 May 1976, when he handed in his resignation. He was a personal choice of the then Prime Minister and later President of the Hellenic Republic, Konstantinos Karamanlis (1907-1998).

During his time at the helm of the telecommunications giant, construction work was carried out on submarine cables and radio links, while telephone connections were gradually increased, with more and more Greeks acquiring telephones. Specifically, at the end of 1975, 22 out of 100 Greeks had a telephone, an increase of more than 146,000 telephones since Petropouleas took over as CEO. It has to be underlined that by the middle of 1976, more than 2 million lines were operating. It is noteworthy that in 1975, 76 new cities, towns and villages joined the network, while Crete was connected to Attica and Cyprus and three new radio networks operated at the same time, connecting Greece with Bulgaria and Turkey.

Furthermore, as part of the government's efforts to better organize the country's defence as well as to consolidate and maintain peace, the Hellenic Army's communications were modernized and strengthened. Indeed, Petropouleas convened a meeting of the Board of Directors of the Hellenic Telecommunications Organisation during which, it was unanimously decided, the amount of 20,000,000 drachmas to be granted for the achievement of the aforementioned purposes.

It is worth noting that during his administration, Athens hosted important and internationally prestigious Summits, such as the 5th World Summit on Telecommunications Satellites (September 1975) with representatives from approximately 60 different countries and representatives from the Greek Government as well as the European Conference of Postal and Telecommunications Administrations on Maritime Communications via Satellite, which was held in the presence of representatives from 12 Western European countries, including Greece, representatives of Greek Ministries and the Union of Greek Shipowners.

In addition to his role as CEO of OTE, Petropouleas also was Chairman of Hellenic Post (ELTA).

Petropouleas was succeeded by his then Deputy CEO and close associate, Chryssostomos (Chryssos) Kavounidis, a descendant of a well-known shipping family.

== Literary work ==
After the end of his term as CEO of the Hellenic Telecommunications Organisation, Petropouleas published two books. The first is entitled "Days of War and Captivity" (1978), while the second, which was published in the late 20th century, is entitled "Memoir of the Petropouleas Family" (1998).

He was often invited by cultural associations to deliver lectures, which were very well received in the intellectual circles of the Greek's capital, Athens.

He died on 22 July 2010 and was buried the next day in the Cemetery of Papagou, Athens.
