= Édouard Grinda =

French politician (1866–1959)

Édouard Joseph Auguste Grinda (20 December 1866 – 28 March 1959) was a French politician best known for The Grinda Report written in 1923 and as architect of France's medical insurance law of 1928. He was born and died in Nice.

== Jobs ==
- "Député" (in English: Deputy, or Member of the French National Assembly) for Alpes-Maritimes from 1919 to 1932
- Minister of Work and Social Security from 13 December 1930 to January 1931 in Théodore Steeg's government

== Family ==
His wife was Augustine Schmitz (d.1965). Their son was Jean-Paul Grinda, whose grandson is Thierry Roussel, the father of Athina Onassis Roussel.

His granddaughter, Hélène Grinda (b. 1944), had an illegitimate daughter with Prince Bernhard of Lippe-Biesterfeld, Alexia Grinda (b. 1967).

== Bibliography ==
He wrote Rapport fait au nom de la Commission d'Assurance et de Prévoyance Sociales chargée d'examiner le project de loi sur les assurances (in English: Report submitted in the name of the Commission of Social Security and Welfare charged to examine the project of law on the insurances). The report was published to the appendix of Procès-verbal of the meeting of January 31, no. 5505. Imprimerie de la Chambre, Paris, 1923.
