= Thierry Roussel =

French businessman (born 1953)

- Born: 16 February 1953 (age 73); Neuilly-sur-Seine, France
- Spouses: Christina Onassis (m. 1984; div. 1987) Marianne Landhage (m. 1990)

Thierry Roussel (born 16 February 1953) is a French businessman. He was the fourth husband of Christina Onassis, daughter of well-noted Greek shipping magnate Aristotle Onassis, and the only man with whom she had a child, daughter Athina Onassis Roussel. Roussel is best known as the controversial former co-trustee of his eldest child's famous fortune and for having been involved in a number of legal entanglements with the four Greek trustees of that fortune. These disputes were mostly ended (or quieted) in 1999 by the court-ordered transfer of the administration of Athina's trust to a private auditing firm.

== Early life and background ==
Thierry Patrick François Roussel was born on 16 February 1953 in Neuilly-sur-Seine, Hauts-de-Seine, near Paris, the son of the late Henri Julien Gaston Roussel, who was President and General Manager of the Roussel Uclaf Laboratoires Pharmaceutiques, and his wife, Francine Grinda, daughter of Jean-Paul Grinda and granddaughter of the French politician Édouard Grinda. He graduated from high school in 1972. He studied economics at Panthéon-Assas University.

He has two sisters: Patricia Roussel and Christine Roussel, the duchess of Luynes (widow of Jean d'Albert, 12th duc de Luynes). His maternal uncles are the veteran Davis Cup tennis player Jean-Noël Grinda and Olivier Grinda. The Roussel family's fortunes derive from the Roussel Uclaf pharmaceutical corporation, most famous in the US for the design of the abortifacient RU-486 (mifepristone).

== Career ==
Roussel reportedly formed his first company at age 22 and went on establishing publicity space rental companies such as AEA, Super-média and Média Center (sold to the Carat Group). He formed the financial management company SGFC in 1987 whereas he is claimed to remain its president. In 2003, Roussel founded GMT Multi-Strategy Fund of Funds with the participation of numerous international banks. The fund's website was no longer active as of 8 February 2020.

It is claimed that Roussel has held business interests in a Paris modeling agency, a boat building corporation in Morocco, and a horse breeding company, European Horses. His daughters Athina and Sandrine have been competitive show jumpers.

A widely publicized failed investment is claimed to be a strawberry farm in Portugal. Some reports, like the Athens News Agency in 1998, say the result was bankruptcy. Diane Sawyer investigated the situation in doing research for her interview with Athina in 1998, and according to Sawyer, although Roussel did not actually file for bankruptcy, he did sell the strawberry farms at a loss. According to Forbes, it was a US$30 million loss. Roussel used his company Oderfruta to invest in the farms, with a borrowed subsidy from the European Union, funding from the Portuguese state and an unknown bank. By 1994, the venture was badly debt-ridden.

== Involvement in Onassis legacy ==
Christina Onassis never trusted Thierry Roussel completely, which led the family to arrange for a Board of Administrators to control the family's money until Athina came of age. The trustees Christina selected to manage Athina's estate in the event of Christina's death were Stelio Papadimitriou, Paul Ioannidis, Apostolos Zabelas, Theodore Gabrielides, and Roussel. The "four Greeks" were frequently dubbed in the media as the "greybeards".

During Athina's childhood and adolescence, all expenditures made on her behalf by her father, funded by Onassis inheritance, had to be approved by the Board in advance. This led to Roussel threatening to move back to Paris, where income taxes would cost the estate a "small fortune a year". In 1999, a Vaduz court ordered the management of Athina's inheritance transferred from the Board to the KPMG Fides auditing firm in Lucerne.

== Personal life ==
=== First marriage ===
Roussel married Christina Onassis in 1984. They had a honeymoon in the Caribbean, but their marriage ended in divorce in 1987. Generally, the story is reported the same way, with the strong suggestion that theirs was a marriage based rather on convenience or infatuation than true love. Whatever the truth, there were certainly serious marital problems. Roussel had at least one extramarital affair during the marriage, with former Swedish model Marianne "Gaby" Landhage, who gave birth to their elder two (of three) children while Roussel was still married to Christina. Landhage and Roussel have a son just a few months younger than his daughter Athina (by Christina).

For Christina's part, she suffered from bouts of serious depression and allegedly self-medicated with drugs and overeating. In any case, Christina and Roussel began divorce proceedings eight months after Athina was born.

=== Second marriage ===
Roussel married Swedish model Marianne "Gaby" Landhage in 1990 in the village church in Villeny near Chambord, the Roussels' estate in Sologne. Athina Roussel was a bridal attendant. By then, Athina was in her father's custody. Roussel and Landhage now have three children: Erik, Sandrine, and Johanna. The two older children were born during Roussel's marriage to Christina — Erik in July 1985 and Sandrine in May 1987. Johanna was born in July 1991.
