= Cibele Dorsa =

Brazilian actress, model and writer

- Born: October 14, 1974; São Paulo, Brazil
- Died: March 26, 2011 (aged 36); São Paulo, Brazil
- Occupation(s): Actress, model, writer
- Height: 1.71/5 ft 6 in
- Partner: Álvaro de Miranda Neto
- Children: 2

Cibele Dorsa (October 14, 1974 – March 26, 2011) was a Brazilian actress, model and writer. She also appeared on the cover of the April 2008 issue of Playboy Brazil.

== Personal life ==
Dorsa had a relationship with Brazilian entrepreneur Fernando Oliva with whom she had a son, also named Fernando. Later she had a relationship with, but never married, show jumping rider Álvaro de Miranda Neto, who subsequently married Athina Onassis. Dorsa and Miranda Neto had a daughter named Viviane.

On June 7, 2008, Cibele Dorsa suffered a serious car accident that killed the friend who drove the car and caused her severe injuries. She stayed in the hospital for a month and was immobilized for two further months. She wrote a book titled 5:00 da Manhã (meaning 5:00 A.M. in Portuguese) about this tragic experience. The title is a reference to the hour when the accident occurred.

In 2010, she started a relationship with the E! Brazil TV presenter Gilberto Scarpa. They planned to marry in April 2011, but Scarpa committed suicide by jumping out of their apartment on January 30, 2011.

After Scarpa's death, Cibele gave several interviews detailing what happened that night. According to her, he wanted to go out and buy drugs, but she wouldn't allow him. To keep him at home, she agreed to have a threesome with him and another woman. However, once the woman was there, Scarpa grew agitated and wouldn't touch either her or Dorsa, saying he was going out to buy drugs. Dorsa, upset, told him their engagement was off; that she was not going to marry him and that he didn't love her more than he loved doing drugs. Scarpa then told her he would show her how much he loved her and jumped out of the window.

== Death ==
After Scarpa's death, Dorsa suffered from severe depression. Dorsa died on March 26, 2011, after she committed suicide jumping from a window on the seventh floor of her apartment building in Morumbi, São Paulo. The suicide was confirmed by messages posted in her Twitter and a suicide letter addressed to her children. She sent her suicide letter to a Brazilian magazine, asking for her children's forgiveness (at the time, they were both living with Álvaro Affonso de Miranda and Athina Onassis in Europe) and saying she didn't believe she was committing suicide, for she already felt dead.
