= Betrayal (1978 film) =

- Lesley Ann Warren and Rip Torn
- Genre: Drama
- Based on: Betrayal by Julie Roy and Lucy Freeman
- Teleplay by: Joanna Crawford; Jerrold Freedman
- Directed by: Paul Wendkos
- Starring: Lesley Ann Warren; Rip Torn
- Theme music composer: Paul Chihara
- Country of origin: United States
- Original language: English

Production
- Executive producers: Roger Gimbel; Tony Converse
- Producer: Marc Trabulus
- Cinematography: Gayne Rescher
- Editor: Dana Cahn
- Running time: 96 minutes
- Production companies: EMI Television; Roger Gimbel Productions

Original release
- Network: NBC
- Release: November 13, 1978

Betrayal is a 1978 American made-for-television drama film directed by Paul Wendkos and starring Rip Torn and Lesley Ann Warren, based on a non-fiction book by Julie Roy with Lucy Freeman. The subject is a real life lawsuit about a woman who sued her psychiatrist after he allegedly lured her into a sexual relationship. The film was first aired on NBC Monday Night at the Movies on November 13, 1978.

== Plot ==
When Julie Roy, a young woman, approaches a maverick attorney Bob Cohen who handled her divorce several years earlier, she was desperate. She needed money to move to San Francisco to escape her painful past and wanted to sue her psychiatrist because he hadn't helped her. What was then revealed by Julie to Bob and his associate, Loren Plotkin, was a frightening expose of how Julie was, in fact, claiming that her psychoanalyst, Doctor Renatus Hartogs, raped her, and over a period of time used her for sex before discarding her.

At first skeptical, the two lawyers were finally persuaded that Julie was telling the truth and they had the grounds for an unprecedented malpractice case that became a landmark decision in legal history.

== Cast ==
- Lesley Ann Warren ... Julie Roy
- Rip Torn ... Doctor Hartogs
- Richard Masur ... Loren Plotkin
- Ron Silver ... Bob Cohen
- Bibi Besch ... Pat
- John Hillerman ... Victor Slavin
- Jane Marla Robbins ... Jane
- Peggy Ann Garner ... Mrs. Carol Stockwood
- Fred Sadoff ... Dr. Todson
- Stephen Elliott ... Judge Allan Myers
- Richard Karlan ... Adam
- Bob Delegall ... Man in Bar
- Richard Seff ... Dr. Van Hoving
