= Julie Roy (activist) =

American activist (born c. 1938)

- Born: 1938 (age 86–87); Port Huron, Michigan

Julie Ellen Roy (born c. 1938) is an American mental health activist. She gained notoriety for being the first woman to successfully sue her psychiatrist for coercing her into sex for allegedly therapeutic reasons.

== Early life ==
Roy was born c. 1938 in Port Huron, Michigan. She was the youngest of four children. Her father left her family's household when she was young; as a result, she was primarily raised by her mother and her brother. Her brother had served in the United States Navy after graduating from high school, and ultimately killed himself as an adult. As a child, Roy's family moved often, settling at times in Muskegon, Michigan as well as in Florida, before returning to Port Huron by the time she had graduated high school. Following her graduation, after living for a year in St. Petersburg, Florida, she moved to Chicago to study interior decorating. While in Chicago, she met her future husband, who lived in New York City and convinced her to move in with him; however, the marriage would ultimately not last. After her divorce from her husband, she had briefly dated another woman.

== Hartogs case and aftermath ==
When Roy complained of her depression to a friend, her friend suggested that she see her therapist, Dr. Pauline Anderson. When Anderson refused to see Roy, she referred her to her colleague, Dr. Renatus Hartogs. At her first session with Hartogs, Roy was invited to a "bathtub party" with him. Within her next few sessions with Hartogs, he had begun propositioning her for sex; when she had asked the reason, he said that it would cure her of her attraction to women.

For a 14 month period, starting in August 1969, Hartogs and Roy routinely had sex, with Hartogs waiving the fee he had set for his services. In turn, Roy started work for Hartogs as a typist in his office. In 1971, Roy stopped seeing Hartogs; upon her release from Hartogs' care, she was committed into the Metropolitan Hospital Center for major depression.

Roy enlisted the services of Robert Stephan Cohen to sue Hartogs after she had ceased visiting him; Cohen had previously represented Roy in her divorce case. After initially failing to appear in court, Hartogs maintained his innocence, claiming that a hydrocele in his groin had made sexual intercourse painful for him. Cohen, however, had found that such a hydrocele could easily be operated on, even by Hartogs himself. Further testimony was given at the trial by a selection of Hartogs' former patients, all of whom claimed that Hartogs had made inappropriate sexual advances towards them, and to have not noticed his hydrocele.

After Hartogs' plea to dismiss the case against him was declined, the jury found Hartogs guilty of medical malpractice, and ordered Hartogs to pay a combined total of $350,000 in damages ($200,000 in compensatory damages, $150,000 in punitive damages). While attempts by Hartogs to have the charges overturned were unsuccessful, he was able to reduce the amount paid in compensatory damages to $50,000 and avoid paying any punitive damages.

Hartogs lost his license to practice medicine in December 1976.

Journalist Lucy Freeman partnered with Roy to write Betrayal, an account of her experience seeing Hartogs and the ensuing lawsuit. The book was released in 1976, and was adapted into a made-for-TV movie in 1978.

== Personal life ==
In Betrayal, Roy is described by Freeman as bisexual, saying that "she liked women--a lot. But she liked men too." Prior to the final decision in the Hartogs case, Roy was living in San Francisco, where she worked as a clerk in a bookstore.
