= Aghios Nikon =

Coordinates: 36°45′07″N 22°20′08″E

Aghios Nikon is a small and mountainous village in the municipality of West Mani in the prefecture of Messinia, Greece. Its former name was Poliana.

== History ==
Aghios Nikon was mentioned for the first time in 1618, in the statistics of Petros Medikos, as a small settlement of 10 houses with the name Poliana di Sigo.

As a village, it seems to have been created by residents from the neighboring villages of Lagkada and Koutifari, while during the pre-revolutionary years it belonged to the captaincy of Platsa.

The current name of the village was given on April 30, 1929, and it is attributed to Saint Nikon the Repentant, who was active in the area as a preacher of Christianity at the end of the 10th century. According to a local tradition, he was buried in the wider area.

== Interesting facts ==
Geographically, it is the eastern boundary of the Western or Outer Mani, on the provincial road Kalamata-Areopolis, while it is 64 km away from the first. The area is characterized as semi-mountainous, as it is located at an altitude of about 400 meters on the western slope of Taygetos. The peak above the village is also called Aghios Nikon and it is located at an altitude of 1214 m. From the village, there is a panoramic view of the Messinian Gulf.

== Population ==
The current population of the village is approximately 54 inhabitants.

== Notable Personalities ==
Notable people who come from Aghios Nikon: (indicatively)

- Michail Petropouleas (Greek: Mιχαήλ Πετροπουλέας), Major General of the Hellenic Army & CEO of the Hellenic Telecommunications Organisation (ΟΤΕ)
