= Faculdades Integradas Rio Branco =

Coordinates: 23.5128°S 46.7014°W

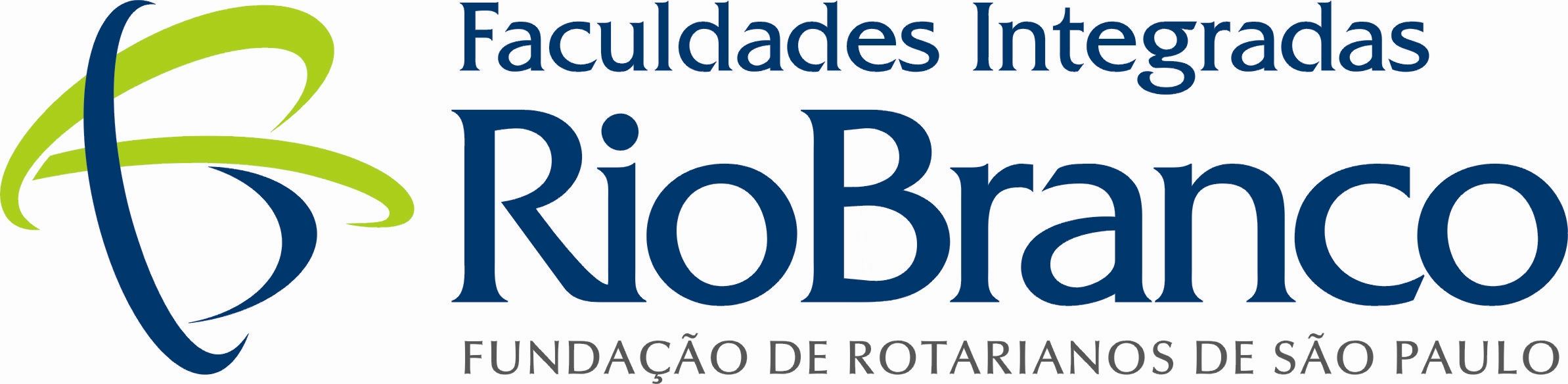
- Type: Private
- Established: Foundation - 1946; College - 2001
- Location: São Paulo- SP, São Paulo, Brazil
- Website: www.riobrancofac.edu.br

The Faculdades Integradas Rio Branco is a Brazilian private institution of higher education, nestled at São Paulo's neighborhood of Lapa. It has appeared as an initiative from the Fundação de Rotarianos de São Paulo - a non-profit entity that promotes the sponsoring of education, created in 1946 by associates of the Rotary Club of São Paulo.

== Undergraduate degrees ==
- Bachelor of Business Administration
- Bachelor in Economics
- Bachelor of Laws
- Publishing
- Journalism
- Linguistics - Translation and Interpreting
- Pedagogy
- Advertising
- Design
- Radio & TV
- Bachelor in International Relations
- Public Relations
- Information System
- Tourism

== MBA & post-graduate degrees ==
- MBA Branding
- Post-graduation - Creative Managing
- Post-graduation - Business Managing
- Post-graduation - Finances Managing
- Post-graduation - Marketing Managing
- Post-graduation - Human Resources Managing
- Post-graduation - International Environmental Law
- Post-graduation - Corporate Social responsibility

== Achievements ==
The school's International Relations undergraduate program is in 3rd place in the national rankings.

The Faculdades Integradas Rio Branco has been classified among the eight best Institutions of Higher Education of São Paulo, according to the results obtained in the Enade (National Examination of Students Development) in 2006.

The best grade in Brazil in Publishing, in 2006, was earned by an alumnus of the Faculdades Integradas Rio Branco.

== Notable alumni ==
- Álvaro de Miranda Neto (born 1973), Brazilian Olympic-class show jumping rider.
