= Theodoros Veniamis =

Greek shipowner (born 1950)

Theodore Veniamis (born 17 November 1950 in Vrontados, Chios) is a Greek shipowner and business leader, best known for serving as the President of the Union of Greek Shipowners (UGS) from 2009 to 2022.

== Career ==
Born into a family rooted in maritime tradition, Veniamis graduated from the Athens University of Economics and Business (ASOEE). In 1977, he joined and helped expand Golden Union Shipping Company, which he continues to lead as CEO, specializing in dry bulk, cement carriers, and car carriers.

In 2022, Theodore Veniamis received the Lloyd's List/Propeller Club Lifetime Achievement Award for his significant contributions to the shipping industry over a long and successful career. Veniamis was one of the longest-serving presidents of the Union, and his term coincided with the difficult years of the economic crisis.

First elected to the board of the Union of Greek Shipowners, the world’s largest national shipowners’, in December 1987 and became a member of the leadership team from 1991. He was elected as president in February 2009, and he was re‑elected for four consecutive terms (2009, 2012, 2015, 2018).

== Awards and honours ==
He has been included multiple times in Lloyd’s List of the most influential shipowners in global shipping.

In 2023, he was honored by the Hellenic Chamber of Shipping for his invaluable contribution to Greek shipping.
