= Robert Stephan Cohen =

American lawyer

- Born: January 14, 1939 (age 87); Brooklyn, New York
- Education: Alfred University; Fordham University School of Law
- Occupation: Attorney
- Spouse: Stephanie J. Stiefel

Robert Stephan Cohen (born January 14, 1939) is an American attorney specializing in divorce cases. He is a senior partner at Cohen Clair Lans Greifer & Simpson LLP, a 21-person family law firm in New York City.

== Early life ==
Cohen was born on January 14, 1939, in Brooklyn, New York, where his father drove a taxi. He was the first member of his family to graduate from college. Cohen received his Bachelor of Arts degree from Alfred University in 1959 when he was 20 years old and worked three jobs to put himself through Fordham University's School of Law, where he received his J.D. in 1962 and served as a Member of the Law Review.

== Career ==
Cohen is a nationally recognized divorce attorney, holding an adjunct professorship at the University of Pennsylvania Law School.

Following his graduation from Fordham School of Law, Cohen worked from 1963 to 1968 with Roy Cohn, an American lawyer who was a member of the U.S. Department of Justice's prosecution team at the espionage trial of Soviet spies Julius and Ethel Rosenberg, in commercial litigation and matrimonial law. In 1969 he left to become the co-founder of another firm, and in 1984 became a founding partner of Morrison Cohen Singer & Weinstein, where for 19 years he was the firm's chairman and headed its matrimonial practice. In 2003, Cohen started Cohen Lans LLP, which in 2011 merged with Clair, Greifer LLP to form Cohen Clair Lans Greifer & Thorpe LLP. Both predecessor firms had been named among Best Law Firms by U.S. News & World Report in its 2010 inaugural edition, and Cohen Clair Lans Greifer & Thorpe has been named "Best" in each subsequent year. He lectures throughout the United States and in Europe.

Cohen represented Julie Roy in her medical malpractice case against psychoanalyst Renatus Hartogs in 1975. The case was notable for being the first successful lawsuit brought upon by a woman against her former therapist for inappropriate sexual relations.

In 2016, Governor Cuomo named Cohen Chairperson of the Judicial Screening Committee for the First Judicial Department, a Committee he has been a member of since 2012. He was also designated as a member of the State Judicial Screening Committee by the Governor in 2016. He was appointed in 2016 by Judge Peter H. Moulton, Administrative Judge at that time of the Supreme Court, New York County, as Chairperson of that Court’s Matrimonial Committee. In 2018, Cohen was reappointed to that position by Judge Deborah A. Kaplan who succeeded Judge Moulton as Administrative Judge. In 2019 he was also appointed by Justice Alan D. Scheinkman as Special Master in the Alternative Dispute Resolution Pilot Program in the Second Judicial Department. In 2019 he was appointed by Presiding Justice Rolando T. Acosta to the Appellate Division, Attorney Grievance Committee for the First Judicial Department. All of the appointments are in New York State.

Since 2003, Cohen has served as an adjunct professor of law at the University of Pennsylvania School of Law where he teaches a course entitled "Anatomy of a Divorce." He is a member of the American College of Family Trial Lawyers and a Fellow of the American Academy of Matrimonial Lawyers. He is a former JAG officer and member of JAG Corps, representing members of the military and their families.

Cohen has been principal attorney in a number of high-profile, high-net-worth divorces for clients in a variety of industries, including finance, entertainment, real estate and politics, in New York and other states across the country. These include Melinda Gates, Rupert Murdoch, Michael Bloomberg, Christie Brinkley, Swedish countess Marie Douglas-David, James Gandolfini, Henry Kravis, Dina Lohan, Marla Maples, Tommy Mottola, Athina Onassis, Charlotte Sarkozy, Uma Thurman, and Ivana Trump. Cohen's book, Reconcilable Differences: Seven Essential Tips to Remaining Together from a Top Matrimonial Lawyer, was published in 2002.

Cohen has been profiled in The Wall Street Journal, The New York Times, Business Insider and the Financial Times. In 2024, he was named one of "America's Top 200 Lawyers" by Forbes.

== Personal life ==
Cohen was an avid marathoner and completed the New York City Marathon in 1983 and 1984, as well as other marathons around the world. Cohen himself is twice-divorced, his first marriage lasted one year; his second, to Margery Rubin, lasted 22 years and yielded three sons. Their four-year divorce battle was finalized in 1994. As of 2009, Cohen was married to Stephanie J. Stiefel, a managing director at Neuberger Berman, and widow of Eric A. Steifel. He resides in New York City.

== Lectures and Publications ==
- Reconcilable Differences, Pocket Books, 2002

== See also ==
- James Sexton
