= Edwina Tops-Alexander =

Australian equestrian

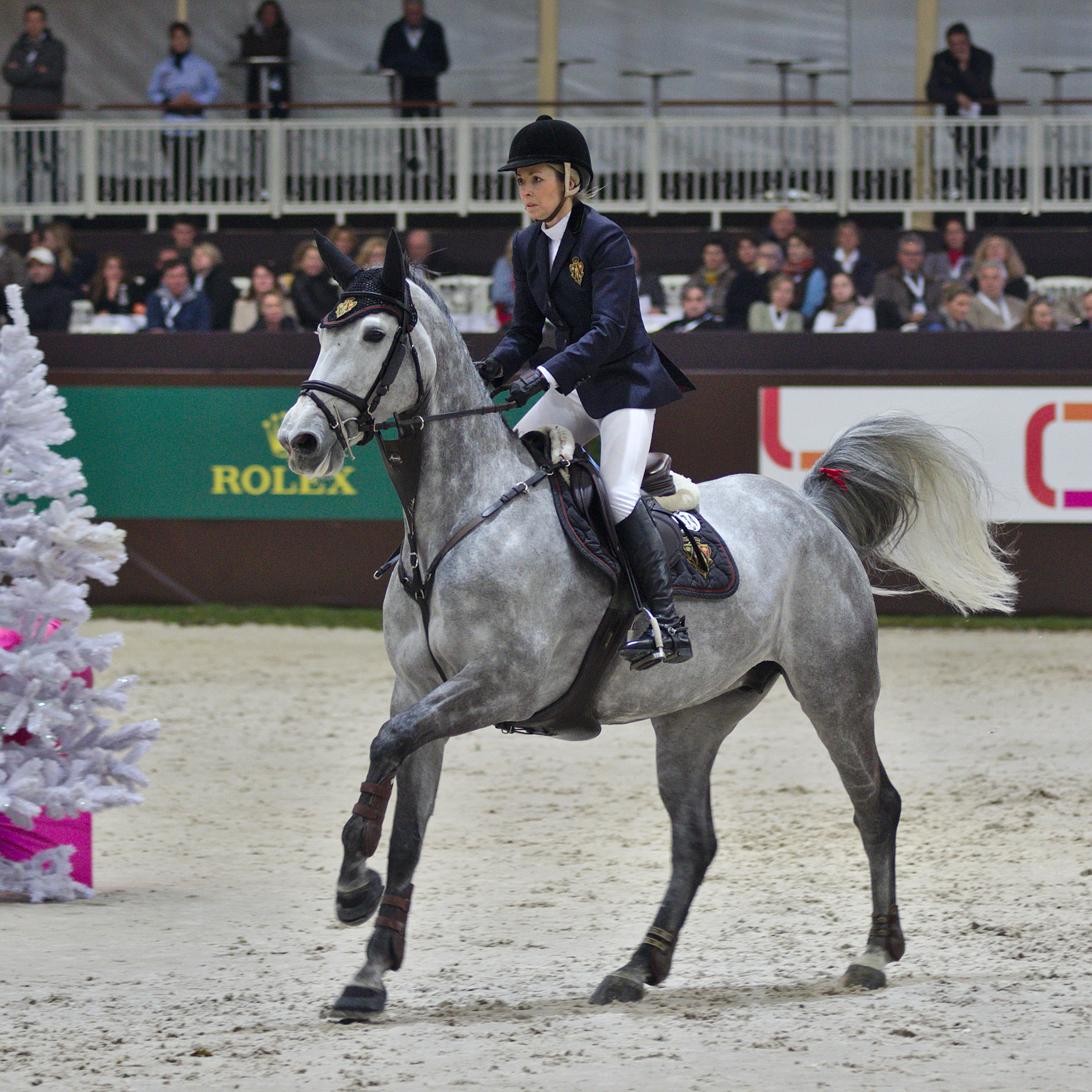
- Edwina Tops-Alexander riding in 2013
- Born: 29 March 1974 (age 52); Sydney, New South Wales, Australia
- Education: Pymble Ladies College Australian College of Physical Education
- Occupation: Professional Showjumper
- Years active: 1998–Present
- Known for: 2016 Summer Olympics and winning The Global Champions Tour in 2011 and 2012
- Height: 5 ft 5 in (165 cm)
- Spouse: Jan Tops

Edwina Tops-Alexander (born 29 March 1974) is an Australian showjumper known for her participation in three Olympics, finishing in the top ten twice. She is the first Australian to place in the top 10 at the World Equestrian Games and the first rider to earn more than €1 million in prize money on the Global Champions Tour. She is Australia's most decorated female equestrian.

Tops-Alexander began riding at age eight through her local Pony Club. In 1995, she won the Australian Young Rider's Championship. She made her debut representing Australia in 1998, the same year that she moved to Europe. In 2000, Tops-Alexander met Dutch rider Jan Tops, who became her coach and later, her husband. In 2002, Tops-Alexander competed at the World Equestrian Games (WEG), hosted that year in Jerez, for the first time. In 2006, she placed fourth at WEG Aachen. That year, she also competed on the Global Champions Tour for the first time. She rode at the 2008 Beijing Olympics, finishing ninth individually and helping Team Australia to a seventh-place finish. In 2011 and 2012, she was the overall winner of the Global Champions Tour. In 2012 she competed at the London Olympics. In 2014 she became the first rider to earn more than €1 million in prize money on the Global Champions Tour. She competed at the 2016 Rio Olympics, captaining the Australian showjumping team and finishing ninth individually. Tops-Alexander finished second, after Rolf-Göran Bengtsson, on the 2016 Longines Global Champions Tour.

== Career ==
=== 1982–1997: Young rider ===
Alexander began riding at the age of eight. She became interested in horses because her neighbor had a barn and she watched them ride on the weekends. The Avondale Pony Club in North Turramurra, New South Wales was where she first began riding. In 1995 she won the Australian Young Rider Championships.

=== 1998–2005: Move to Europe and professional beginnings ===
In 1998, wanting to ride against the top riders in the world, she moved to Europe, taking her horse, Mr. Dundee, with her to Belgium. In 1999, before beginning her own company, she competed for Ludo Philippaerts, a famous show jumper, for about three years.

=== 2006–2012: First two Olympic cycles ===
In 2006 in Aachen Germany, she became the first Australian to make the final of the individual jumping competition at the World Equestrian Games, where she finished fourth despite entering the competition as 35th in world show jumping rankings. Brussels, Valkenswaard, London, Zürich, Cannes, Geneva, Vigo, and Doha are just few of the places where Edwina has won Grand Prix shows. She was selected for the jumping events at the 2008 Summer Olympics where she rode Isovlas Itot du Chateau. She placed 9th in the individuals and 9th in the team competition. She was the overall champion of the Global Champions Tour in both 2011 and 2012. Not only did she win twice in a row but she was the very first rider to win a total of one million euros of prize money on the tour. Also in 2012, at the age of 38, she rode in the individual show jumping for Australia at the Summer Olympics. She rode Itot Du Chateau and finished in a time of 81.77s with 4 faults. This put her in 20th place for the individual competition and for them team competition Australia was 10th.

=== 2013–present: Prizewinning record, third Olympics, hiatus and return ===
In 2016 Edwina won the Miami Beach Grand Prix, the first Global Champions Tour round of the season. Edwina placed ninth in the individual showjumping during the 2016 Summer Olympics, with Lintea Tequila. She currently has Lintea Tequila, California, and Carentina De Jonter as her main horses.

On 19 March 2017 Tops-Alexander won the Saut Hermès competition in Paris, on the mare California. A week later, she announced an indefinite hiatus from competition due to her pregnancy.

On 14 September 2017, Tops-Alexander made a return to 5* competition in Switzerland. "To be honest I never really felt like I was on a break. I was so busy I didn't even get time to read a book. I had a very easy pregnancy. I was never tired and I had no sickness except for having no appetite. I just enjoy so much spending time with Chloé and getting to understand her" said Tops-Alexander in an interview.

Tops-Alexander was selected for the Tokyo 2020 Olympics and rode Identity Viseroel in the Jumping event. She was not able to progress to the final.

== Personal life ==
Alexander attended Pymble Ladies College, in Sydney. She attained a Bachelor of Physical Education at the Australian College of Physical Education in 1995. In September 2011 she married Jan Tops who was also her trainer. Edwina is a dual citizen of Australia and the Netherlands and speaks some Dutch, but primarily speaks English and has retained her Australian accent. Edwina still competes for Australia even though she has been living in the Netherlands for 20 years. She is openly proud of her roots in the suburbs of Sydney.

She suffered a serious fall in 2007 during a Grand Prix in Estoril, Portugal, and split her lip. In 2012, she suffered a broken wrist and a concussion after falling, during a show in France.

On 28 March 2017, Tops-Alexander announced that she was putting her career on hold and leaving the sport as she prepared to give birth to her first daughter in August 2017. Chloe Cornelia Jennifer Tops was born on 30 July 2017 in the Princess Grace Hospital Centre, Monaco.

== Endorsements ==
Tops-Alexander was sponsored by Gucci until 2016. She is currently sponsored by Equestrian Stockholm, a Swedish equestrian fashion brand, Equifit Inc. and Jaeger-LeCoultre, a Swiss watchmaker.
