= Global Champions Tour =

Show jumping series

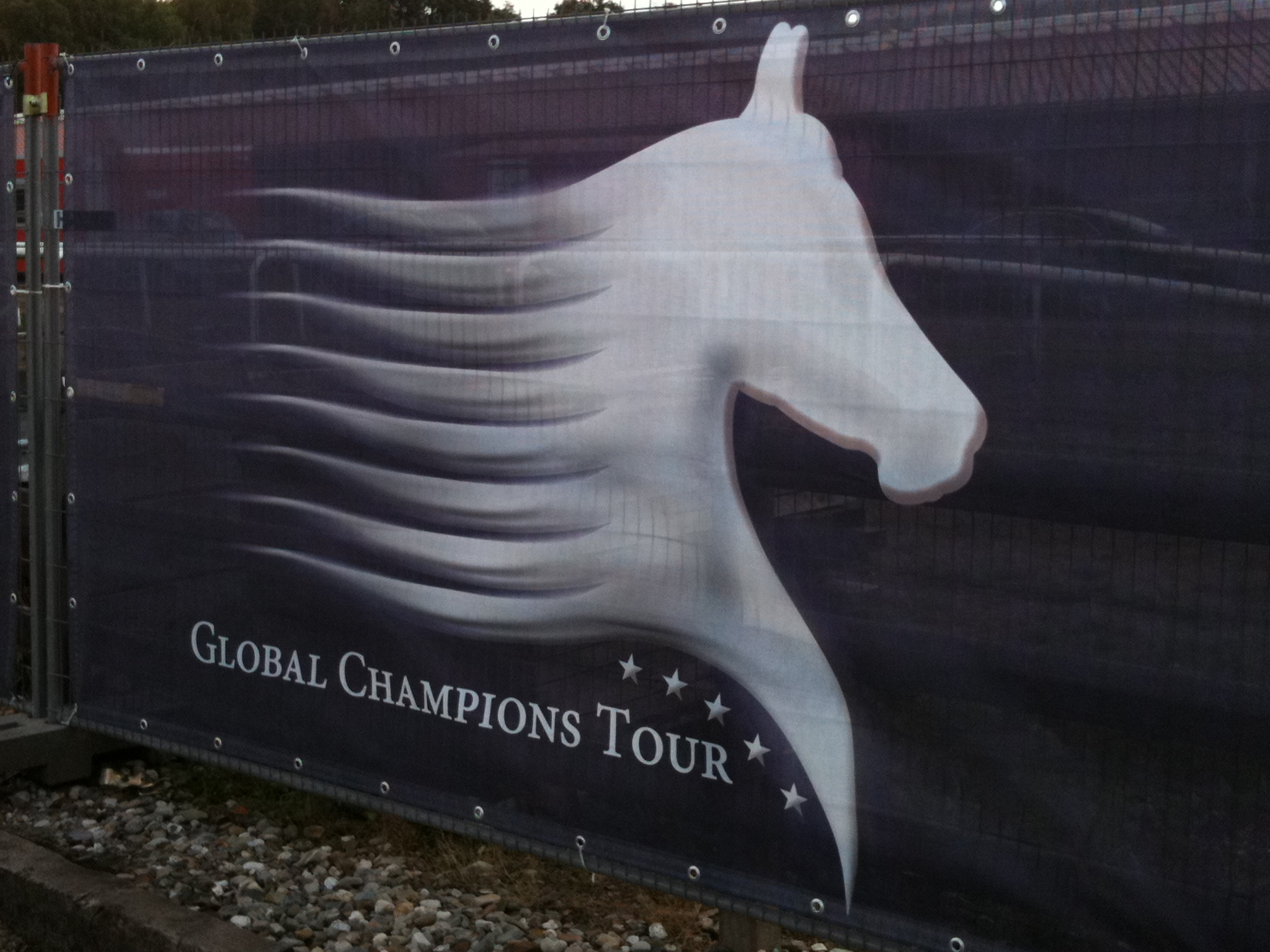
- Logo of Global Champions Tour
- Highest governing body: International Federation for Equestrian Sports (FEI)
- Nicknames: Show jumping

Characteristics
- Contact: Global Champions Tour official site
- Team members: Individual
- Mixed-sex: yes
- Type: outdoor/indoor
- Equipment: horse, horse tack
- Venue: Generally outdoor arena with dirt or similar footing suitable for the horse

The Longines Global Champions Tour (LGCT) is an annual pre-eminent individual show jumping series that comprises up to 15 rounds of competition hosted around the world. It brings together the top 30 riders in the FEI Jumping World Rankings.

It was founded in 2006 by the Olympic gold medalist Jan Tops. Member of the Monaco royal family Charlotte Casiraghi is Honorary President of the Jumping International de Monte-Carlo leg of the tour and regular high-profile competitors include Athina Onassis, Georgina Bloomberg (who also owns a team which competes in the Global Champions League), Jessica Springsteen, Guillaume Canet and Jennifer Gates.

In 2014, overall LGCT Championship winner Scott Brash (see Rules below) received just under €300,000, making it the biggest single prize in any of the three Olympic equestrian disciplines (dressage, eventing, and showjumping). During this season, Brash won over €852,000 in total prize money making the Longines Global Champions Tour one of, if not the, richest equestrian sporting series in the world.

Since 2007, all LGCT events have been held as CSI 5*, which means that under FEI rules they are championship-level events. The LGCT classes are run under FEI rules but the governing body has no part in the organization of the series, aside from ratifying the schedule. The LGCT is not an FEI series like the World Cup or the Nations Cup competitions.

The television broadcaster is Eurosport. Title Partner and Official Timekeeper Longines has been part of the global circuit since 2013.

== Competition type ==
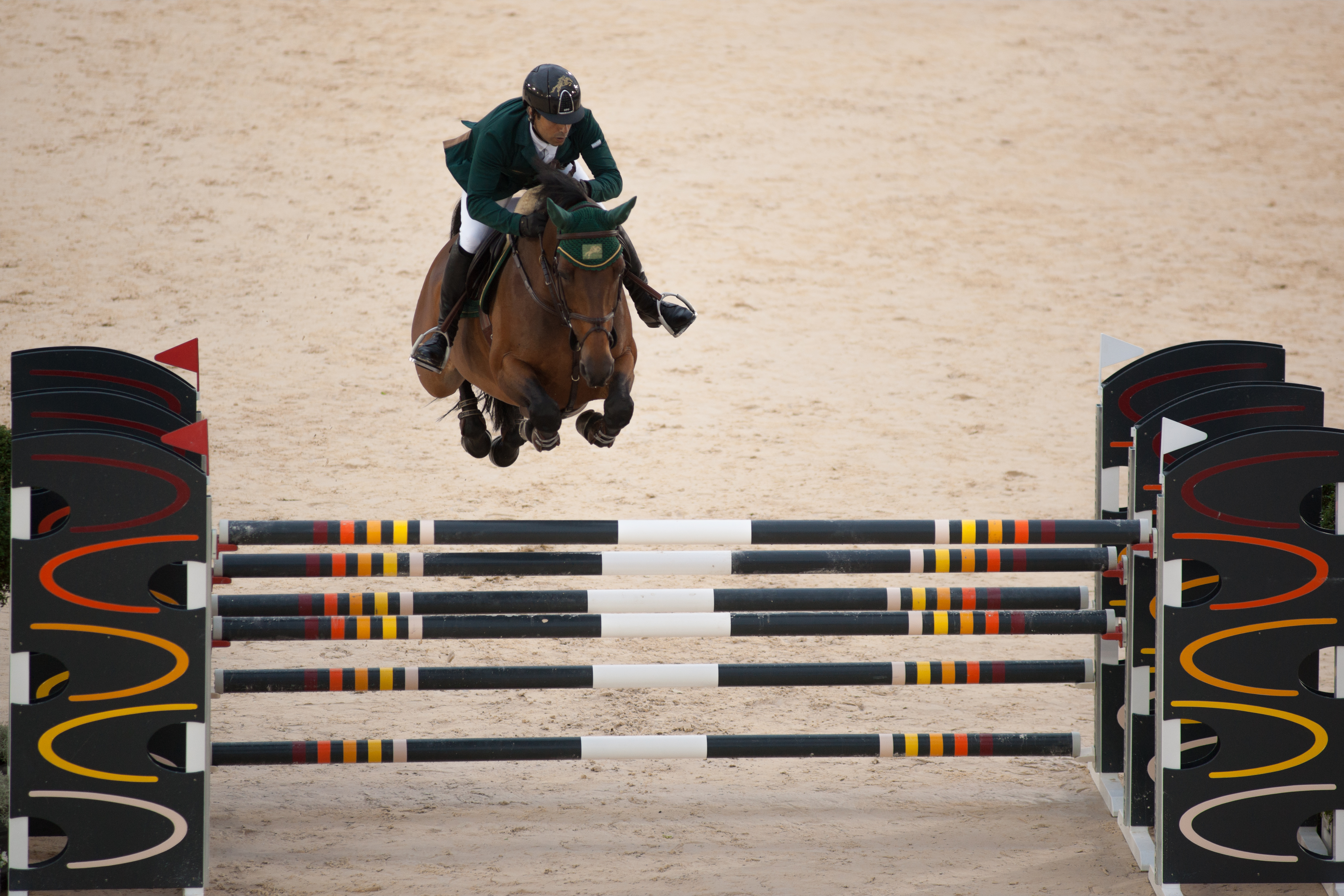
Kamal Bahamdan & Noblesse Des Tess competing in the 2013 Longines Global Champions Tour

Allowed to participate in Global Champions Tour (GCT) events are:

- the World Ranking Top 30. If a top-30 rider refuses to take part the competitor field is filled by the organizer with riders ranking within Top 150.
- Wild Card owners: Wild Cards are distributed by GCT rights holders, local GCT organizers, national coaches, and the FEI.

Until 2016 GCT competitions consisted of two rounds, plus a Jump-Off. The course was changed after the first round and the second round was limited to the top-18 riders of the first round or all fault-free riders if there were more than 18 zero-point-rounds. The points collected during the first round were added to the points collected during the second round.

When FEI accepted the Global Champions League as an international jumping series in 2017 the mode of the Global Champions Tour was changed:
a Global Champions League Team competition is held the day before the Global Champions Tour Grand Prix. The second round of the Global Champions League competition is the qualification out of which the top-25 riders qualify individually for the Global Champions Tour.
The Global Champions Tour competition is a single-round competition plus a Jump-Off. All riders start with zero points. The horse can be changed between the two competitions.

The 2018 Global Champions League Team competition finished with a unique first-ever Super Cup in Prague, and the Spanish winning Team 'Madrid in Motion' (Eduardo Alvarez Aznar, Mikel Van Der Vleuten, Mark Houtzager).

== Rules ==
The overall standings are determined by the placement of the rider in the Grand Prix competitions of the Longines Global Champions Tour. The scoring is carried out as follows:

Competition Placing	1	2	3	4	5	6	7	8	9	10	11	12	13	14	15	16	17	18	19	20	21	22	23	24	25
Points Scored	40	37	35	33	32	31	30	29	28	27	26	25	24	23	22	21	20	19	12	11	10	9	8	7	6

Points won by competitors who are tied are added together and then divided equally. Fifty percent of the rider's best results count towards their overall LGCT ranking classification, thus with 14 events in 2014, seven of the riders best results count towards their overall ranking and any additional weakest scores are dropped.

In 2008 and 2009, the winner was determined in a separate final. The top 25 riders of this season overall standings were allowed to participate in the final.

In 2006 and 2007, and again from 2010, the winner was determined by the overall standings of the season.

== Winners ==
Year	Champion	Nation
2006	Ludo Philippaerts	Belgium
2007	Nick Skelton	United Kingdom
2008	Jessica Kürten	Ireland
2009	Michel Robert	France
2010	Marcus Ehning	Germany
2011	Edwina Tops-Alexander	Australia
2012	Edwina Tops-Alexander	Australia
2013	Scott Brash	United Kingdom
2014	Scott Brash	United Kingdom
2015	Luciana Diniz	Portugal
2016	Rolf-Göran Bengtsson	Sweden
2017	Harrie Smolders	Netherlands
2018	Ben Maher	United Kingdom
2019	Ben Maher	United Kingdom
2020	-	
2021	Peder Fredricson	Sweden
2022	Ben Maher	United Kingdom
2023	Harrie Smolders	Netherlands
2024	Max Kühner	Germany
2025	Gilles Thomas	Belgium

In 2013, Britain's Scott Brash became the first rider to do the double and win the final Grand Prix and the Championship in one go – all on his 28th birthday (23 November). Brash, riding his 2012 Olympic gold medal-winning horse Hello Sanctos, netted €443,000 in prize money for the two wins.

In 2014, having been World Number One rider for a year (the first time a rider had been World Number One this long since Marcus Ehning in 2006) Scott Brash successfully defended his title for a second consecutive year having won a record three Grand Prix (London, Cannes and Cascais-Estoril) with Hello Sanctos during that season. Germany's Ludger Beerbaum had led coming into the final Grand Prix in Doha, but due to illness his top horse Chiara could not compete and he instead rode the less experienced Zinedine, collecting 17 faults in the first round and eventually dropping to 3rd in the overall Championship. For the second time in his career, Swede Rolf-Goran Bengtsson had to accept second place in the Championship despite finishing on the same points as the winner, as he did not have as many season wins (Rolf finished 2nd to Edwina Tops-Alexander in 2012). However, Bengtsson put in a spectacular performance in the final Grand Prix to win with his stallion Casall ASK.

== Venues ==
listed in alphabetical order of the respective host country

The legs of the 2025 Longines Global Champions Tour are:

- (Austria) Vienna, Schönbrunn Palace, a venue from 2025
- (China) Shanghai – Juss International Equestrian Centre, a venue since 2024
- (Czech Republic) Prague – O2 Arena, a venue since 2018, not in 2023
- (Spain) Madrid – Club de Campo Villa de Madrid, a venue since 2013
- (France) Cannes – Stade des Hespérides, venue since 2006, not in 2021
- (France) Paris – Champ de Mars, a venue in 2014, 2015, 2020 and 2025
- (France) Ramatuelle/Saint-Tropez – Pampelonne beach, a venue since 2018
- (United Kingdom) London – Royal Hospital Chelsea, a venue since 2017
- (Germany) Riesenbeck, Riesenbeck International, a venue since 2023
- (Italy) Rome – Circus Maximus, a venue since 2021
- Mexico City – Campo Marte, a venue since 2016
- (Monaco) Monte Carlo – Port Hercules, a venue since 2006
- (Morocco) Rabat – Grand Theatre of Rabat, a venue since 2024
- (Netherlands) Valkenswaard – Stal Tops, a venue since 2006
- (Qatar) Doha – Al Shaqab, a venue since 2008
- (United States) New York – Liberty State Park, a venue from 2025
- (Saudi Arabia) Riyadh – Diriyah Equestrian Centre, a venue since 2022

Former venues of the Longines Global Champions Tour are:

- (Austria) Vienna – Magna Racino, a venue in 2014
- (Austria) Vienna, Rathausplatz, a venue in 2012, 2013 and 2015
- (Austria) Vienna, Trabrennbahn Krieau, a venue in 2016
- (Belgium) Stud Zangersheide near Lanaken EU Open Masters and Future Masters, a venue in 2006
- (Belgium) Antwerp – Port of Antwerp, a venue from 2014 to 2016
- (Brazil) Rio de Janeiro Athina Onassis International Horse Show, Sociedade Hípica Brasileira in Rio de Janeiro, a venue from 2009 to 2011
- (Canada) Montreal – Old Port of Montreal, a venue in 2019
- Shanghai – China Art Museum, Pudong New Area, a venue from 2014 to 2019
- (Spain) La Coruna – Casas Novas Equestrian Centre, a venue in 2023
- (Spain) Valencia, City of Arts and Sciences, emptied pond in front of Museu de les Ciències Príncipe Felipe, a venue from 2009 to 2011
- (Spain) Valencia Oliva Nova Beach and Golf Resort, a venue in 2012
- (France) Chantilly – Chantilly Jumping situated on the Chantilly Racecourse, a venue from 2010 to 2019
- (France) Paris – Parc de Bagatelle, a venue from 2016 to 2019
- (Germany) Berlin – Summer garden at Funkturm, a venue from 2017 to 2021
- (Germany) Hamburg – Derby Park Klein Flottbek, a venue from 2008 to 2021
- (Germany) Wiesbaden Pfingstturnier, Schlosspark Biebrich, a venue for 2012 and 2013
- (Greece) Markopoulo Olympic Equestrian Centre near Athens, a venue in 2007
- (Italy) Rome – Stadio dei Marmi, a venue from 2015 to 2020
- (Italy) Arezzo, Arezzo Equestrian Centre, a venue from 2007 to 2009
- (Italy) La Mandria near Turino, a venue in 2010
- (Portugal) Cascais near Estoril – Hipódromo Manuel Possolo, a venue from 2006 to 2019
- (Switzerland) Lausanne – The marina, a venue from 2012 to 2014
- (Sweden) Stockholm – Olympic Stadium, a venue from 2019 to 2024
- (United Arab Emirates) Abu Dhabi, Al-Forsan International Sports Resort, a venue in 2011, 2012 and 2024
- (United Kingdom) London, Queen Elizabeth Olympic Park, a venue in 2013
- (United Kingdom) London, Horse Guards Parade, a venue in 2014
- (United Kingdom) London, Syon Park, a venue in 2015
- (United States) New York – Governors Island, a venue from 2019 to 2022, not in 2021
- (United States) Wellington (Florida) Winter Equestrian Festival, Palm Beach International Equestrian Center (PBIEC), a venue in 2006 and 2007
- (United States) Miami, Florida – Miami Beach, a venue from 2015 to 2019 and from 2022 to 2024
