= Paul Ioannidis =

Greek aviator (1924–2021)

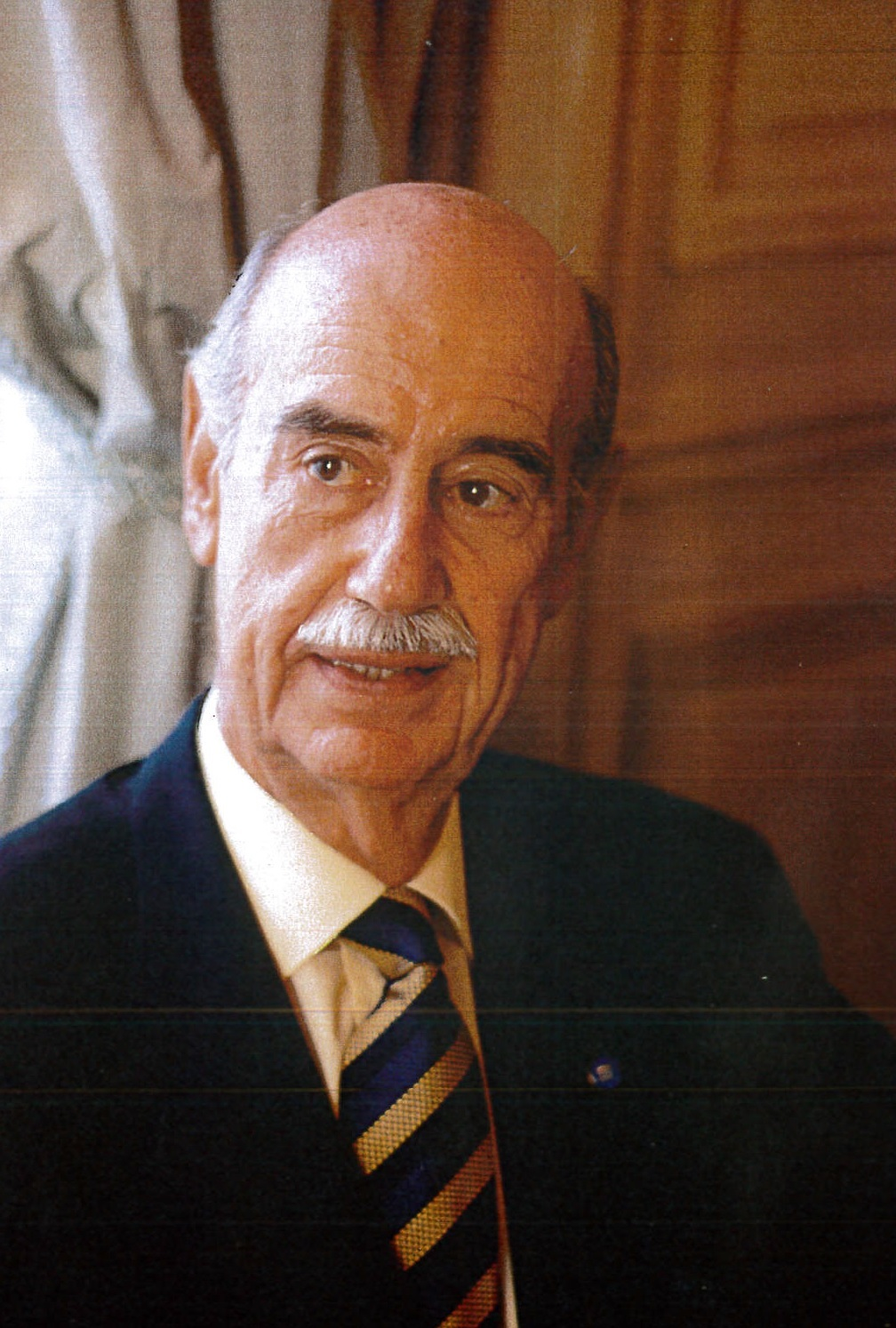
Paul Ioannidis

Paul J. Ioannidis (22 February 1924 – 1 May 2021) was a German-born Greek pilot, resistance fighter, and later shipping industry executive. In his later life, he was a long-term employee of various organisations associated with Aristotle Onassis and his family.

== Early life ==
Ioannidis was born in Berlin and raised in Athens.

== Military career ==
In early 1943, aged 18, he joined the Greek resistance against the Axis occupation. Initially, he joined the team of Nikiforos in the Greek People's Liberation Army (ELAS) and subsequently "Force 133", an allied military unit operating in occupied Greece, which was a part of the British Special Operations Executive (SOE).

In June 1944, following orders from the Allied Force Headquarters, he escaped from Greece with two British officers (McIntyre and Bob Morton) and reached Cairo. He was honored for his bravery during the war by King George VI with the King's Medal for Courage (KMC) of the British Empire and with a Certificate of Commendation by the British Field Marshal Harold Alexander. He later returned these distinctions to Charles Peake, British Ambassador in Athens, on 10 May 1956, in protest at the execution of two Cypriot EOKA militants in Nicosia.

Ioannidis was trained as a fighter pilot by the Royal Air Force. He subsequently joined the Royal Hellenic Air Force and served until 1947.

== Civilian pilot career ==
He was employed by the Greek air carrier TAE, which became Olympic Airways (OA) upon acquisition by Aristotle Onassis in 1957. At OA he served, successively, as Chief Instructor, Chief Pilot, Flight Operations Director and finally as Director General until December 1974. He continued to fly with OA until his retirement in February 1984, having logged over 22,500 hours as Captain and Instructor. He also flew the Royal Family for 12 years, as Captain on OA and the VIP aircraft of the Greek Air Force.

From the start of his career, Ioannidis was concerned with aviation safety, particularly with reducing the risk of human error, the main cause of all accidents in the field of transportation. In 1982, he was responsible for the implementation of aviation safety procedures in the Onassis fleet, including rigorous recurrent training, use of simulators and checklists, standardised procedures and regulations, the so-called "Airline Concept".

== Onassis Foundation and shipping industry ==
In his will, Onassis appointed Ioannidis a lifetime member of the board of directors of the Onassis Foundation, established in December 1975. He served as Vice President of both the commercial and public benefit foundations until 2005. He also served as Chairman of the Board of all companies owned by Christina Onassis and was one of the executors of her will.

From 1975 to 1984 he was involved with the business activities of the Onassis Foundation, eventually becoming chief executive officer of shipping and commercial operations, an office held until 1995. He was on the board of directors of the Union of Greek Shipowners from 1979 to 2005, including six years as vice-president and 14 years as president of its training committee. He was named member emeritus in 2000. He was also on the board of the Hellenic Marine Environment Protection Association (HELMEPA), chairing its training committee for nine years and serving as vice-president for one year. In these roles at the three organisations he introduced the "Airline Concept" to the Greek shipping industry for the first time.

Ioannidis was also a member of the American Bureau of Shipping (ABS) from 1990, serving on its council from 1992, a member of its board of directors for 10 years, and chair of the bureau's Greek National Committee for 10 years. He was named council emeritus in 2004. He was also a member of the UK P&I Club for eight years.

== Awards and recognition ==
Ioannidis received a number of awards during his career, in honour of his contributions to the aviation and shipping industries.

- Honored by the Union of Masters and Mates of the Greek Merchant Marine, and named Member Emeritus in 1995.
- Medal of the City of Athens (2002) for his social contribution.
- Saint Mark's Cross (2006), presented by Theodoros II, Pope and Patriarch of Alexandria and All Africa.
- Lifetime Achievement Award from Seatrade International "in recognition of his exceptional work in introducing aviation style standards to the Onassis fleet in 1982 and also for his support for the Alexander S. Onassis Foundation". The ceremony was held at Guildhall, London, in April 2011, and the award was presented by Princess Anne.
- Golden Cross of the Order of Honour of the Greek Republic (2012) for his national and social contribution.
- Honored by the Hellenic Air Force Academy (2013) for his national and social contribution, as well as for his 37 years service as an airline captain.
- Lifetime Achievement Award from Lloyds List/Propeller Club (November 2017).

== Personal life ==
Ioannidis was married to Sylvia Apostolidou-Ioannidou from 1950. He spoke English and elementary German.

== Publications ==
Ioannidis wrote his biography in Greek, under the title Even If You Are Not... You Will Become, published in December 2007 by A.A. Livanis, and translated into English under the title Destiny Prevails.
