= Athina Onassis =

French-Greek heiress and equestrian athlete

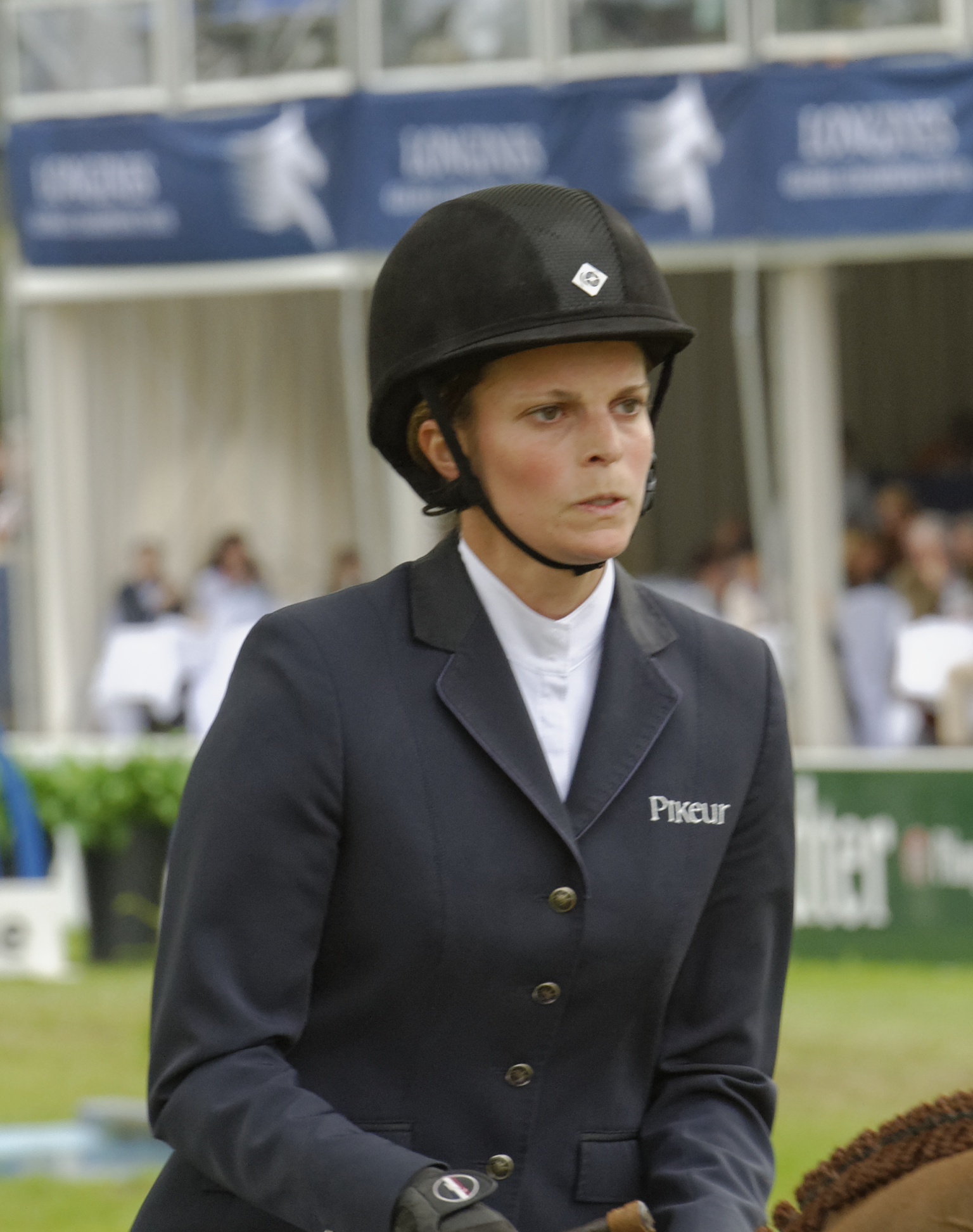
- Onassis in 2013
- Born: Athina Hélène Roussel; 29 January 1985 (age 41); American Hospital of Paris, Neuilly-sur-Seine, France
- Occupations: Equestrian athlete Owner of AD Sport Horses
- Spouse: Álvaro de Miranda Neto (m. 2005; div. 2017)
- Parent(s): Thierry Roussel; Christina Onassis

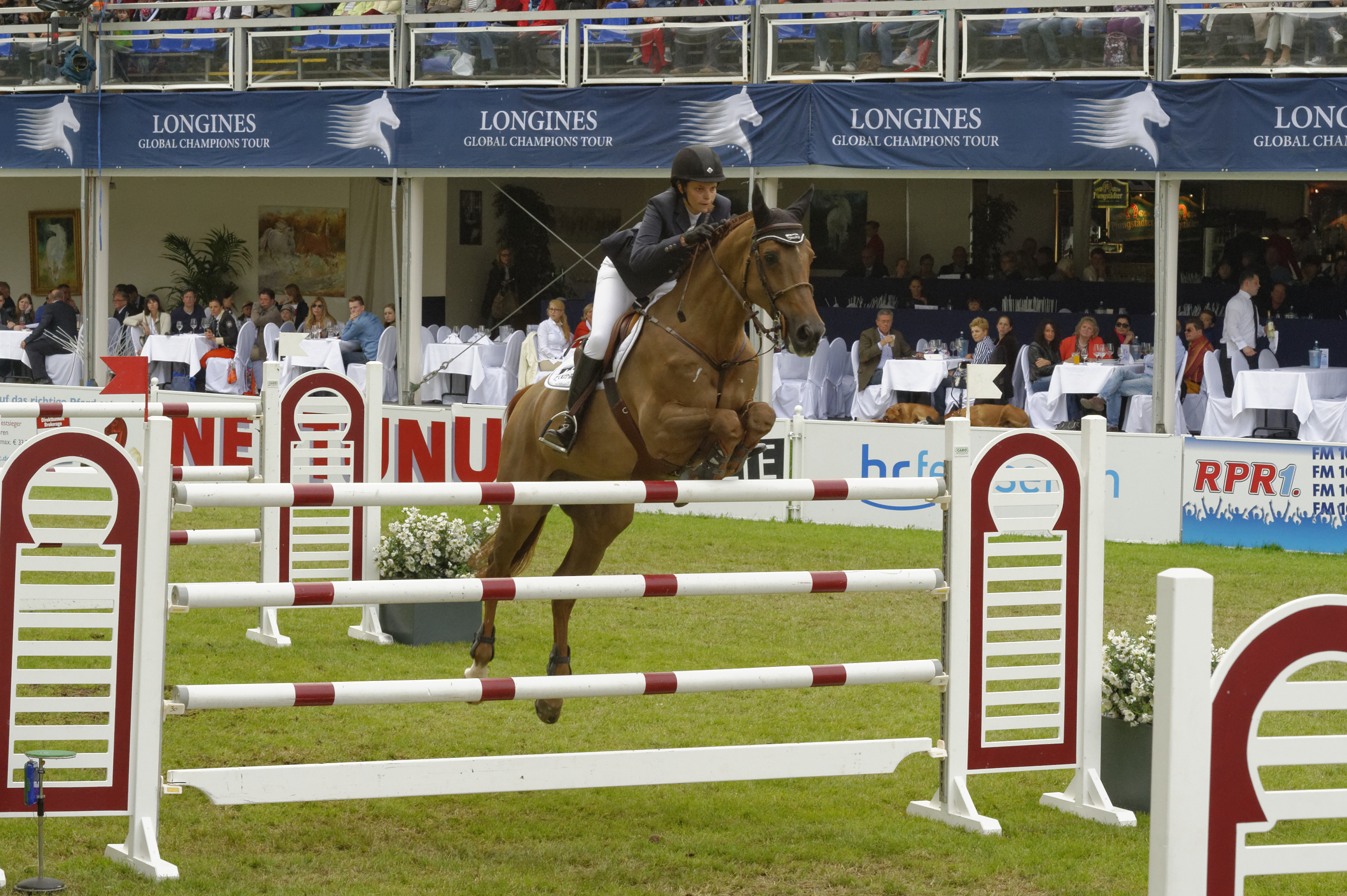
Wiesbaden 2013

Athina Hélène Onassis (Greek: Αθηνά Ωνάση; née Roussel (Greek: Αθηνά Ρουσσέλ), born 29 January 1985) is a French-Greek heiress and equestrian, the only surviving descendant of the Greek-Argentine shipping magnate Aristotle Onassis and his first wife Athina, via their daughter Christina Onassis and Thierry Roussel.

She reportedly lives in Belgium and makes rare public appearances.

== Early life, family and education ==
Onassis was born at American Hospital of Paris in Neuilly-sur-Seine, France, to Christina Onassis (1950–1988) and her fourth husband, Thierry Roussel, a French pharmaceutical heir. She was baptized on the island of Skorpios, owned by the Onassis family at the time. Her parents were married from 1984 to 1987. They divorced after Roussel had two children with his mistress, Swedish model Marianne "Gaby" Landhage. Christina Onassis died of pulmonary edema in November 1988, when Athina was three years old. After her mother's death, she was raised by Roussel and Landhage, whom Roussel later married.

For her early education, Onassis attended a school in Lussy-sur-Morges, Switzerland, where the Roussels lived. Following a preparatory course in Brussels, Belgium, she passed her baccalauréat exam in the summer of 2003.

Onassis has three half-siblings via her father's relationship with Landhage: Erik Christopher Roussel (born July 1985), Sandrine Roussel (born May 1987), and Johanna Roussel (born July 1991).

== Equestrienne ==
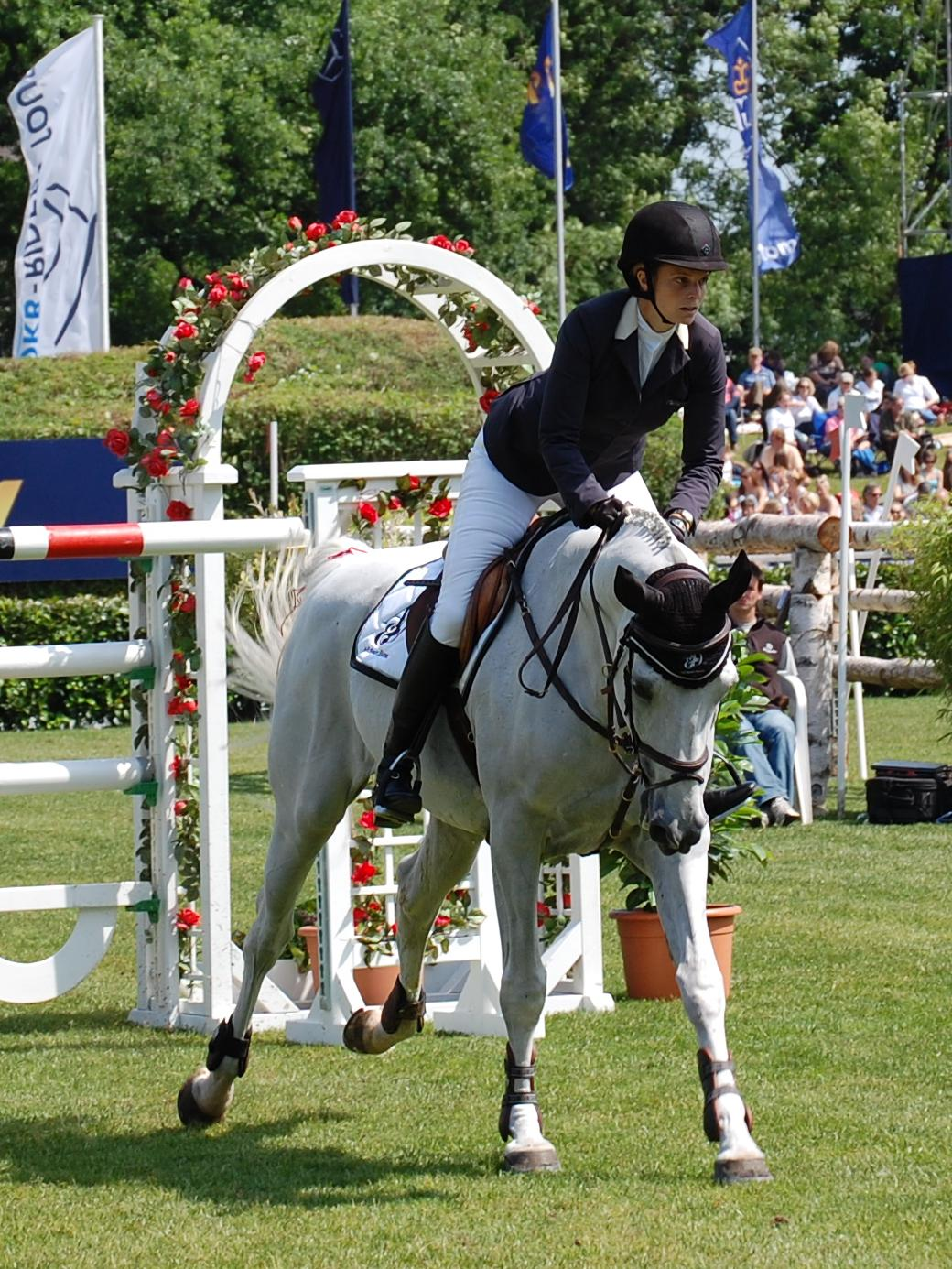
Athina Onassis with AD Crosshill, CSI 5* horse show Hamburg 2011

Onassis is a competitive show jumper in select events of the Global Champions Tour. She began riding as a child, and finished second in an event in Jerez, Spain in 2001. She later chose to compete as a Greek citizen for the Avlona Riding Club in Athens, under the name Athina Onassis. In November 2012, Onassis suffered a spinal injury in a fall from her horse, but represented Greece in the 2013 European Show Jumping Championships and the 2014 World Championships.

Onassis is a patroness of the Global Champions Tour. The Athina Onassis International Horse Show, a show jumping competition, was established in 2007 in São Paulo and moved to Rio de Janeiro in 2009. In 2014, the competition moved to Pampelonne beach in Saint-Tropez, France. Onassis and her former husband were joint owners of AD Sport Horses, a horse breeding and training business based in Fleurus, Belgium. In February 2014, Onassis paid $12 million for a 2.3-hectare (5.6-acre) estate and barn in Wellington, Florida. She sold the estate in April 2017 for $12.75 million.

== Personal life ==
Onassis began dating Brazilian professional showjumper and two-time Olympic medalist Álvaro de Miranda Neto in March 2003 and moved to São Paulo. She bought a 980-square-metre (10,500 sq ft) duplex overlooking Ibirapuera Park for $8.6 million.

Miranda and Onassis were married on 3 December 2005. Most guests attending the lavish ceremony were Brazilian VIPs or friends from the equestrian community. The bride's father and stepmother were not present. The couple reportedly asked for their guests to donate to charity. Following her marriage, Onassis assumed the name Athina Onassis.

In 2016, the couple legally separated, following Miranda's alleged infidelity. Divorce negotiations began almost immediately, with Onassis hiring high-profile divorce lawyer Robert Stephan Cohen. The divorce caused complicated legal issues in the courts of Antwerp, Belgium, where Onassis had been living. Miranda challenged the prenuptial agreement and demanded alimony payments, and there were custody disputes over jointly owned horses. The divorce was settled in November 2017. After her divorce, she was said to be living in Belgium.

== Wealth ==
Athina Onassis is the sole heiress of Christina Onassis, who inherited 55% of Aristotle Onassis's fortune. The remaining 45% of Aristotle's fortune (minus $26 million settled upon Jacqueline Kennedy Onassis) was left to the Alexander S. Onassis Foundation, established in honor of Alexander Onassis, Christina's late brother, who had died in January 1973, at the age of 24, after his airplane crashed in Athens. In 2018 The New York Times cited a report from the Associated Press, naming Onassis one of the year's new billionaires, and even though she is often credited as a "billionaire heiress" throughout the media, the true extent of her wealth remains unknown. There have been several estimates of her inheritance, including the island of Skorpios, which was later sold to trusts connected with Ekaterina Rybolovleva, with some accounts claiming that Onassis's net worth is less than $1 billion. Rybolovleva bought the island for $153 million.

=== Disputes over Onassis estate ===
Onassis' mother Christina never trusted Thierry Roussel completely, which led the family to arrange for a board of administrators to control the family's money until Athina came of age. The trustees Christina selected to manage the estate were Stelio Papadimitriou, Paul Ioannidis, Apostolos Zabelas, and Theodore Gabrielides. During Athina's childhood and adolescence, all expenditures made on her behalf by her father (using money from the inheritance) had to be approved by the board, which led to her father threatening to move back to France, where the estate would have had to pay much higher income tax.

In 1999, a Vaduz court ordered the management of Athina's inheritance to be transferred to the KPMG Fides auditing firm in Lucerne, Switzerland. At that time, aged 13, Onassis stated that she felt "great aversion to anything Greek". In one of her few interviews, published in Oggi, an Italian magazine, she later stated that she blamed "all the problems" on the Onassis name. Similarly, her stepmother, Gaby Landhage, stated on American television show 20/20 that Athina had told her "if she could burn all the Onassis money, she would do it."

On her 18th birthday, Athina took control of her mother's inheritance. After her 21st birthday in 2006, her lawyers unsuccessfully fought to instate her as President of the Onassis Foundation, as the board claimed she was unqualified and denied that she was an heir to the estate of Aristotle Onassis. Invoking her grandfather's legacy in memory of Alexander Onassis, the board's representatives stated that she had no connection with the Greek culture, religion, language or shared experience, that she never went to college, and had no work experience.

== Independent wealth ==
According to a report from the Greek Reporter in 2025, Onassis became an investor and joined the board of directors at the company Groupe Casino.
