= Robert J. Cohen =

American public interest lawyer

Robert J. Cohen (born 1948) is the Executive Director of the Legal Aid Society of Orange County.

== Education ==
In 1972, Cohen graduated from the John Marshall Law School (Chicago).

== Career ==
Cohen started his career in 1974, as a staff attorney for Clark County Legal Services in Las Vegas, Nevada. Cohen joined Legal Aid in 1980. He worked for five years at the National Senior Citizens Law Center in Los Angeles.

== Awards ==
The State Bar of California presented Cohen with 2003 Loren Miller Legal Services Award.
