= Lucy Freeman =

American writer (1916–2004)

- Born: Lucy Greenbaum; 1916
- Died: 2004 (aged 87–88)
- Occupation: Writer
- Known for: Writings on psychiatry and mental health

Lucy Sylvia Freeman (née Greenbaum ; 13 Dec 1916–29 Dec 2004) was an American journalist and author who published 78 books. She is best known for her articles on psychiatry and mental health for The New York Times, after being hired by the newspaper in 1940. Freeman pushed for other editors to cover these topics and she was central to the growth of such coverage.

Freeman also helped preserve Sigmund Freud’s private papers and wrote many books discussing Freud, as well as other areas of psychiatry. The publication of these books allowed previously taboo subjects to become normalized among the general audience.

The American Psychiatric Association awarded her the Writers Award in 1976. In 1986, she was awarded the National Media Award by the Chicago Institute for Psychoanalysis.

== Selected books ==
- Fight against Fears. 1951.
- Hope for the Troubled. 1953.
- The Story of Psychoanalysis. 1958.
- Before I Kill More. New York: Pocket Books, 1958.
- Exploring the Mind of Man: Sigmund Freud and the Age of Psychology. 1969.
- (with Julie Roy) Betrayal. 1976.
- The Sorrow and the Fury: Overcoming Hurt and Loss from Childhood to Old Age. 1978.
- (with Sherry La Follette and George A. Zabriskie) Belle: The Biography of Belle Case La Follette. New York: Beaufort Books, 1986.
- Our Inner World of Rage: Understanding and Transforming the Power of Anger. 1990.
- The Story of Anna O.. Paragon House, 1990.
- (with Charles Schlaifer) Heart's Work: Civil War Heroine and Champion of the Mentally Ill, Dorothea Lynde Dix. New York: Paragon House, 1991.
- (with Alma H. Bond) America's First Woman Warrior: The Courage of Deborah Sampson. 1992.
- Murder in Manhattan
- Healing Homosexuality: Case Stories of Reparative Therapy
- Missing in Manhattan
