= Jan Tops =

Dutch equestrian

Medal record

Equestrian

Representing the Netherlands

Olympic Games
Gold medal – first place	1992 Barcelona	Team jumping

European Championships
Gold medal – first place	1991 La Baule	Team jumping
Silver medal – second place	1997 Mannheim	Team jumping
Bronze medal – third place	1999 Hickstead	Team jumping

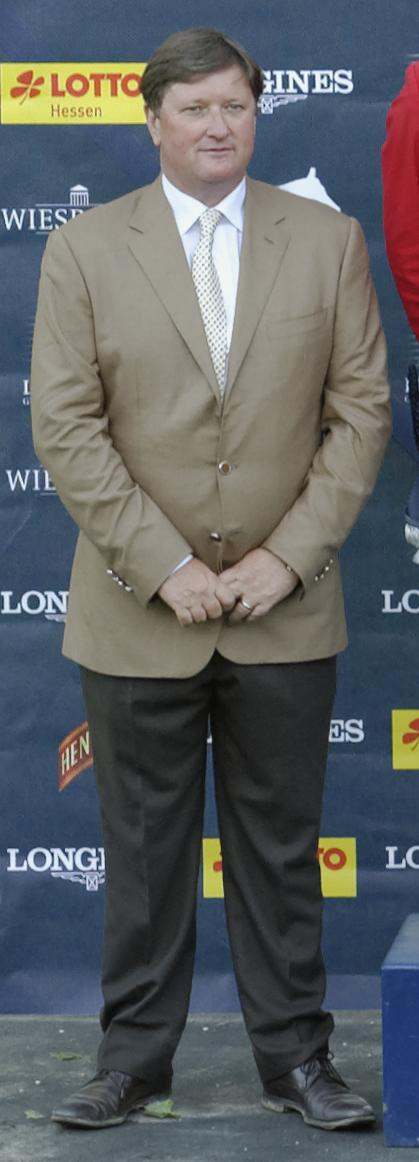
Jan Tops

Johannes Augustinus Petrus "Jan" Tops (born 5 April 1961) is an equestrian from the Netherlands, who won the gold medal in the team jumping event at the 1992 Summer Olympics in Barcelona, Spain riding Top Gun. He did so alongside Piet Raijmakers, Jos Lansink and Bert Romp. He competed in four consecutive Summer Olympics for his native country, starting in 1988.

Jan Tops initiated the Global Champions Tour in 2006. The equestrian sport was in need of a positive impulse, and by founding this world class renown tour, the media attention was increased as well as the prize money.

Presenting sponsors CN and CN WorldWide have been with the GCT since the beginning, as well as media partner Eurosport who broadcasts the Global Champions Tour legs in 59 countries. Rolex has become the official timepiece since 2008.

The legs of 2008 took place in Doha (QAT), Hamburg (GER), Cannes (FRA), Monte-Carlo (MON), Estoril (POR), Valkenswaard (NED), Arezzo (ITA), and São Paulo (BRA).

Tops was born in Valkenswaard. He married Australian-born Edwina Alexander in September 2011.
