= Union of Greek Shipowners =

Trade association

- Formation: 1916; 110 years ago
- Founded at: Piraeus
- Type: Union
- Legal status: Legal Entity under Private Law
- Headquarters: Piraeus
- Fields: Shipping; Ship ownership Ship Operation
- President: Melina Travlos
- Website: ugs.gr/en/

The Union of Greek Shipowners (UGS, or, in its Greek initials, EEE) is a trade association for Greek ship-owners.

Founded in February 1916, it is headquartered in Piraeus, with offices in Brussels and Washington, D.C. The UGS closely follows developments in the United Nations International Maritime Organization (IMO), the International Labour Organization (ILO), the Organisation for Economic Co-operation and Development (OECD), the International Chamber of Commerce (ICC) and other global bodies. The UGS is a member of the International Chamber of Shipping (ICS) and the European Community Shipowners’ Associations (ECSA) and participates in the European Economic and Social Committee (EESC) and the Economic and Social Council of Greece (ESC). The UGS is also a member of the Arctic Economic Council (AEC).

The UGS also maintains close relations with the Hellenic Chamber of Shipping, the London-based Greek Shipping Co-operation Committee (GSCC) and the Hellenic Marine Environment Protection Association (HELMEPA).

== Presidents and current Board of Directors ==
=== Presidents ===
Since 1916 the Union has been headed by 17 Presidents:

N	President	Origin	From	Until
1	Leonidas Embiricos	Andros	1916	1920
2	Vacant	—	1920	1924
3	Stamatios Embiricos	Andros	1924	1934
4	Nicolaos Kyriakides of	Prokonessos	1934	1935
5	Basil Goulandris	Andros	1935	1936
6	Michael Pneumaticos	Kasos	1936	1938
7	Costas Michalos	Chios	1938	1946
8	Loucas Nomicos	Santorini	1946	1950
9	Nicolaos Lykiardopoulos	Cephalonia	1950	1960
10	Stratis Andreadis	Chios	1960	1974
11	Vacant	—	1974	1975
12	Anthony Chandris	Chios	1975	1981
13	Aristomenis Karageorgis	Piraeus	1981	1984
14	Stathis Gourdomichalis	Athens	1984	1991
15	John G. Goumas	Athens	1991	1997
16	John Lyras	London (with roots in Chios)	1997	2003
17	Nicos Efthymiou	Piraeus	2003	2009
18	Theodoros Veniamis	Chios	2009	2022
19	Melina Travlos	Cephalonia	2022	present

=== Board of Directors ===
The current Board of Directors

Composition of the current Board of Directors
President	Travlos N. Melina
Vice Presidents	Chandris D. Michael
Vice Presidents	Lemos N. Andonis T.
Secretaries	Veniamis Th. Nikolaos
Secretaries	Fafalios J. Dimitrios
Deputy Secretaries	Youroukos D. Georgios
Deputy Secretaries	Procopiou G. Johanna
Treasurer	Xylas A. John
Deputy Treasurer	Caroussis I. Constandinos
Members	Angelicoussis I. Maria
Members	Angelopoulos C. George
Members	Constantacopoulos V. Constantinos
Members	Coustas D. John (Dr.)
Members	Economou Ch. George
Members	Fragkista A. Maria
Members	Frangou N. Angeliki
Members	Kanellakis C. Antonios
Members	Karageorgiou K. George
Members	Lekanidis S. Ioannis
Members	Livanos G. Stavros
Members	Lyras C. John
Members	Margaronis I. George
Members	Marinakis M. Evangelos
Members	Martinos C. Nikolaos
Members	Nomikos A. Markos
Members	Paliou S. Semiramis
Members	Papagiannopoulos A. Vasileios
Members	Pappas P. Alexandros
Members	Pittas I. Aristeidis
Members	Saracakis D. Dimitris
