= Domino van de Middelstede =

Show jumping horse from Belgium

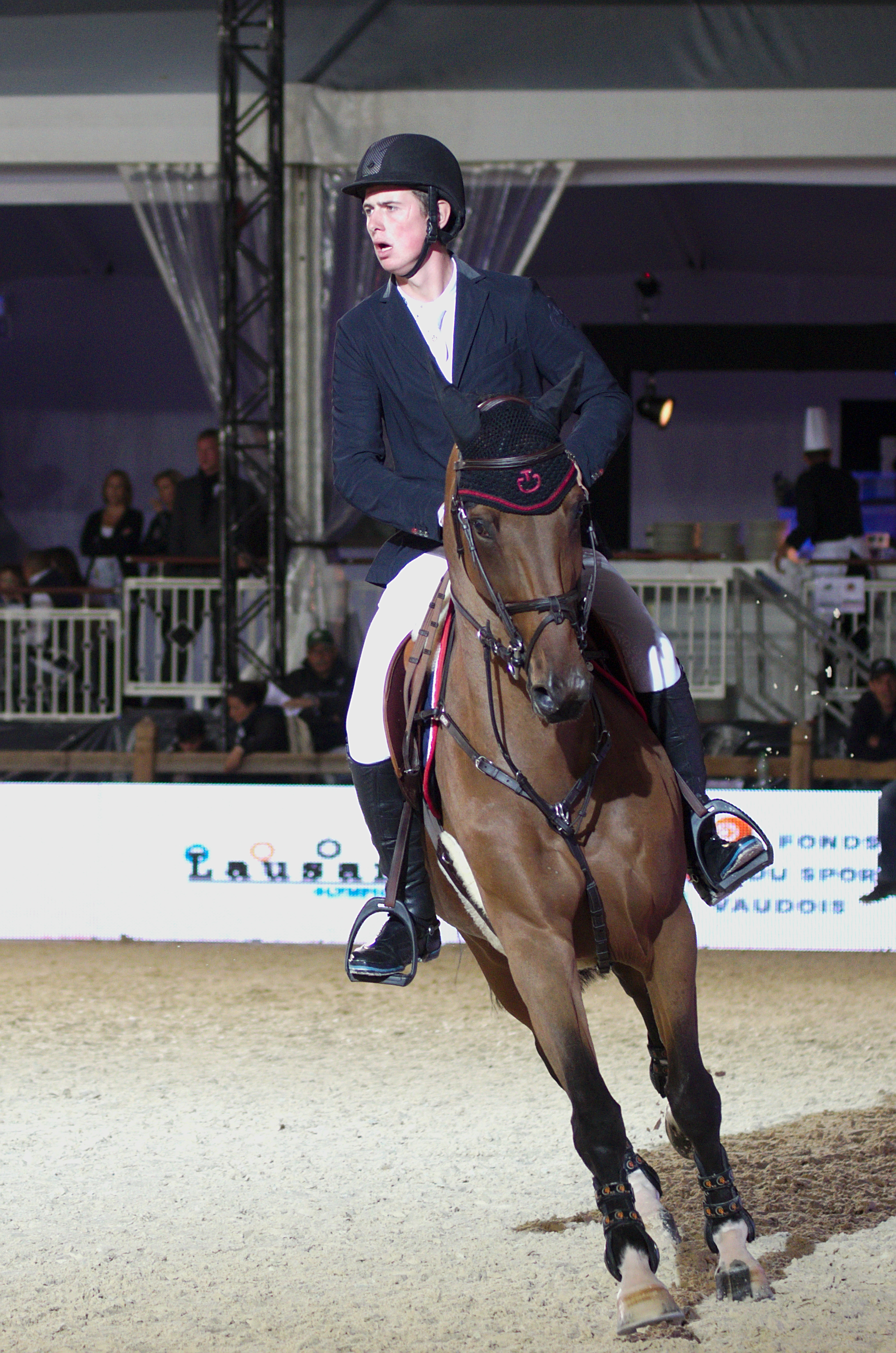
- Domino ridden by Jos Verlooy at the Global Champions Tour stage in Lausanne, September 2013
- Sire: Thunder van de Zuuthoeve
- Dam: Queen d'Azur Middelstede
- Foaled: Rijkevorsel

Domino van de Middelstede (nicknamed Domino, born April 21, 2003) is a bay gelding from the BWP studbook, ridden in show jumping by the young Belgian rider Jos Verlooy, then by an American, Audrey Coulter. He was acquired at the age of 7 by Axel Verlooy, owner of a commercial stable and father of Jos Verlooy, to enable his son to become an international rider. The pair built a successful career, placing 5th in the final of the 2014-2015 Show Jumping World Cup in Las Vegas, in their first appearance at this level of competition. Failing to qualify for the 2016 Summer Olympics, the Verlooys then sold Domino to Audrey Coulter. Renowned for his intelligence and pleasant disposition, Domino was retired at the end of 2018, at the age of 15.

== History ==
=== Early years ===
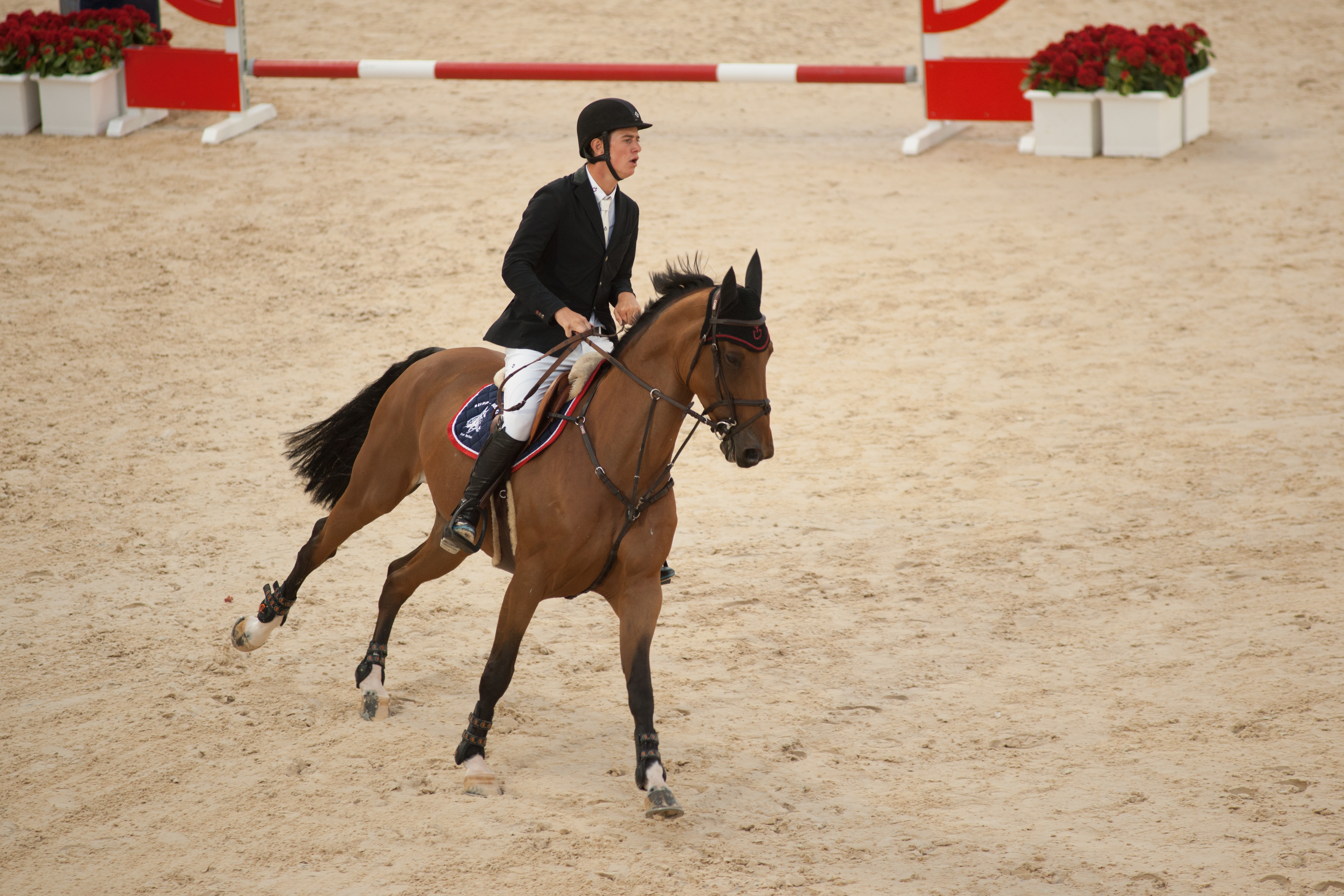
Domino ridden by Jos Verlooy at the Global Champions Tour stage in Lausanne, September 2013.

Domino was born on April 21, 2003 at Jef Adriaensen's kennel in Rijkevorsel, Belgium, under the original name Domino van de Middelstede. He was introduced to the young Jos Verlooy by his father, the horse dealer Axel Verlooy, when the rider was 13 or 14 years old, and the horse 7: he intended to train to enter the young rider classes. From then on, the horse was housed at the Euro Horse trading and training stables in Grobbendonk. The pair quickly climbed the show jumping ladder, winning the Belgian Junior Show Jumping Championship title and finishing fourth individually at the European Junior Championships in 2012.

=== Transition to senior competition ===
Domino and Verlooy are selected for the European Senior Championships in Herning in 2013. They are the only Belgian horse-rider pair to reach the final of this competition.

Domino takes part in the 2014 World Equestrian Games in Caen, again with Jos Verlooy, as a reserve member of the Belgian show jumping team. He replaces Jos Lansink and Litrange LXII, who failed to pass the veterinary inspection. These Games were a relative failure for the couple, due to a fall in the first event. The following week, they were disqualified from the Global Champions Tour stage in Lausanne. They bounced back throughout the rest of the season, winning the Los Angeles Grand Prix without touching a single bar, the first Grand Prix won by the then 18-year-old Verlooy. During the winter of 2014-2015, Domino achieved clear rounds on around 30 % of his courses. In April 2015, the pair placed 5th in their first World Cup Final appearance, due to a bar on the last obstacle in the final round.

Verlooy hopes that the quality of his horse will encourage the Belgian team to be selected for the Olympics. However, the results of the Belgian team and the couple were modest during the 2015 European Show Jumping Championships: Verlooy was eliminated, and the Belgian team finished 11th.

=== Sale to Audrey Coulter and retirement ===
The absence of a Belgian team selection for the 2016 Summer Olympics prompts the Verlooy family to sell Domino.

Still owned by Axel Verlooy, Domino was sold at the age of 12, in September 2015, to the Copernicus stables of American Audrey Coulter, who rode him at the same stables (Euro Horse) as the Verlooys. The Verlooys hope that Domino will enable the American to reach the Olympic Games. Due to modest results with his new rider, the gelding reunited with Jos Verlooy in early 2017, for 4 months. He stops competing after September 2017.

Domino was retired on December 10, 2018, at the age of 15.

== Description ==
Domino is a bay gelding registered in the BWP studbook, standing 1.70 m tall. Verlooy describes him as a very intelligent horse with a pleasant character. He usually works him twice a day, including a walk in the forest.

== Achievements ==
Domino has enabled Jos Verlooy to build his international career, rising to 32nd place in the ranking of the world's best show jumpers.

=== In 2012 ===
- Belgian Junior Show Jumping Champions
- March 29, 2012: Second in the Grand Prix of the 2-star international show jumping competition (CSI2*) in Bonheiden, at 1.45 m
- August 13, 2012: 4th individual at the European Young Riders Jumping Championships in Ebreichsdorf
- September 6, 2012: Second in the Grand Prix of the CSI2* in Zandhoven, at 1.45 m
- September 14, 2012: Winner of the Prix Equestrio and Prix Libra Law at the CSI2* in Lausanne, at 1.40 m and 1.45 m
- December 14, 2012: Winner of the Grand Prix at the CSI2* in La Coruña, at 1.45 m

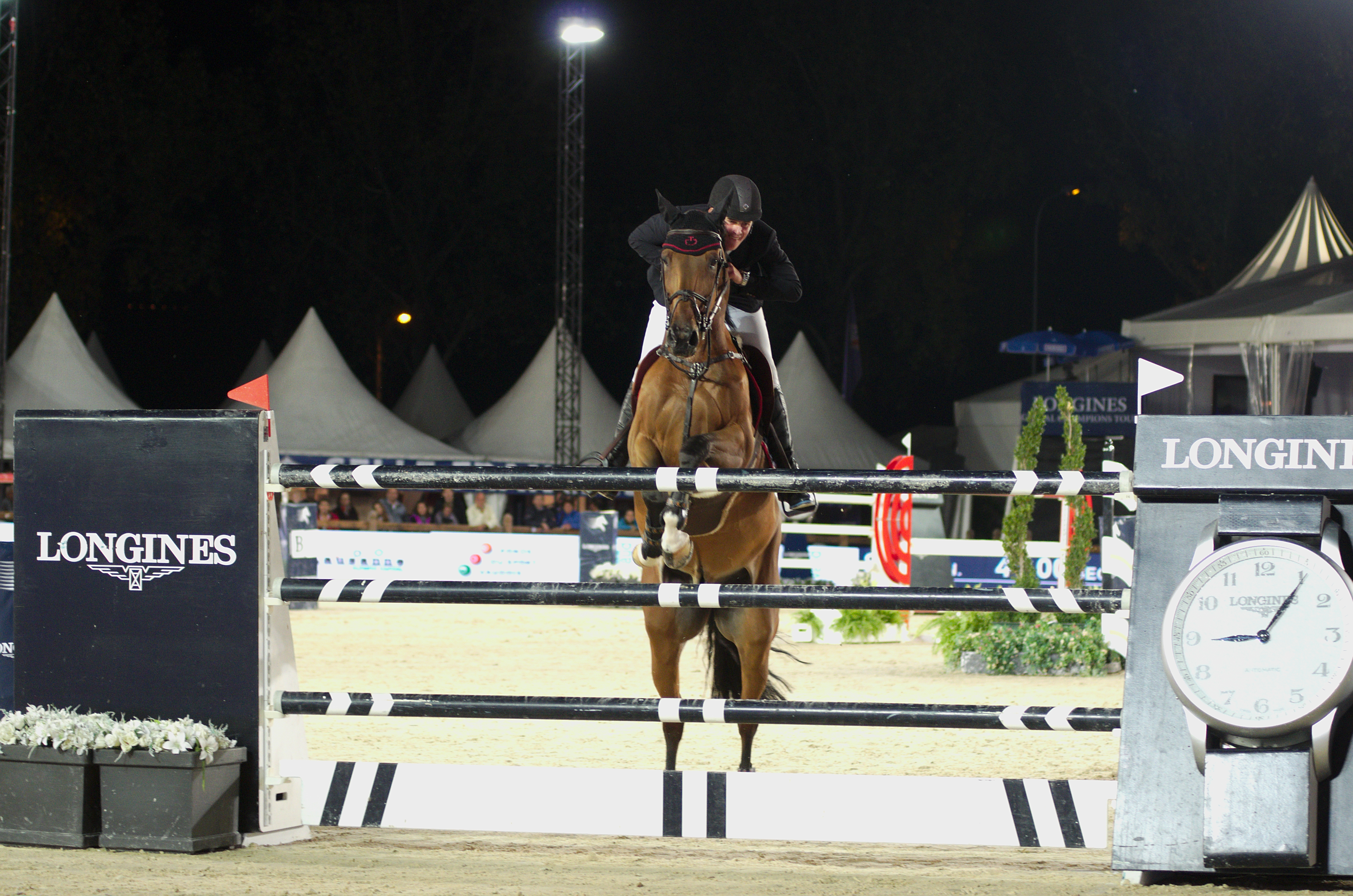
Domino ridden by Jos Verlooy at the Global Champions Tour stage in Lausanne, September 2013.

=== In 2013 ===
- January 18, 2013: 5th in the Prix De Telegraaf at the 4-star international jumping competition (CSI4*) in Amsterdam, at 1.50 m
- February 26, 2013: 3rd in the Grand Prix of the Vilamoura CSI2* (Atlantic Tour stage), at 1.45 m
- March 12, 2013: 13th in the Grand Prix of the 3-star international jumping competition (CSI3*) in Vilamoura (Atlantic Tour stage), at 1.50 m
- April 8, 2013: 4th in the Grand Prix of the Lanaken CSI3*, at 1.50 m April 25, 2013: 12th in the CSI4* Antwerp Grand Prix, at 1.60 m
- May 2, 2013: 19th in the Grand Prix of the 4-star international Olympic jumping competition (CSIO4*) in Lummen, at 1.60 m
- September 14, 2013: 15th in the Grand Prix of the Global Champions Tour stage in Lausanne, at 1.60 m
- September 29, 2013: 5th in the Nations Cup leg of the 5-star international Olympic jumping competition (CSIO5*) in Barcelona, at 1.60 m
- November 5, 2013: 9th in the Nations' Cup stage, 4-star international jumping competition (CSI4*-W) in Toronto, at 1.60 m

=== In 2014 ===
- April 13, 2014: 9th in the Grand Prix of the Lanaken three-star international jumping competition (CSI3*)
- May 2, 2014: 3rd in the Nations' Cup leg of the 5-star International Olympic Jumping Competition (CSIO5*) in Lummen, at 1.60 m
- May 17, 2014: 5th in the CSIO5* in La Baule, at 1.60 m
- May 30, 2014: 6th, CSIO5* St. Gallen, at 1.60 m
- August 1, 2014: 4th, CSIO5* Hickstead, at 1.60 m
- September 28, 2014: Winner of the Grand Prix of the Los Angeles International Five-Star Jumping Competition (CSI5*)
- December 21, 2014: 11th in the World Cup stage (CSI5*-W) in London, at 1.40 m-1.60 m
- December 30, 2014: 7th in the World Cup stage (CSI5*-W) in Mechelen, at 1.40 m-1.60 m

=== In 2015 ===
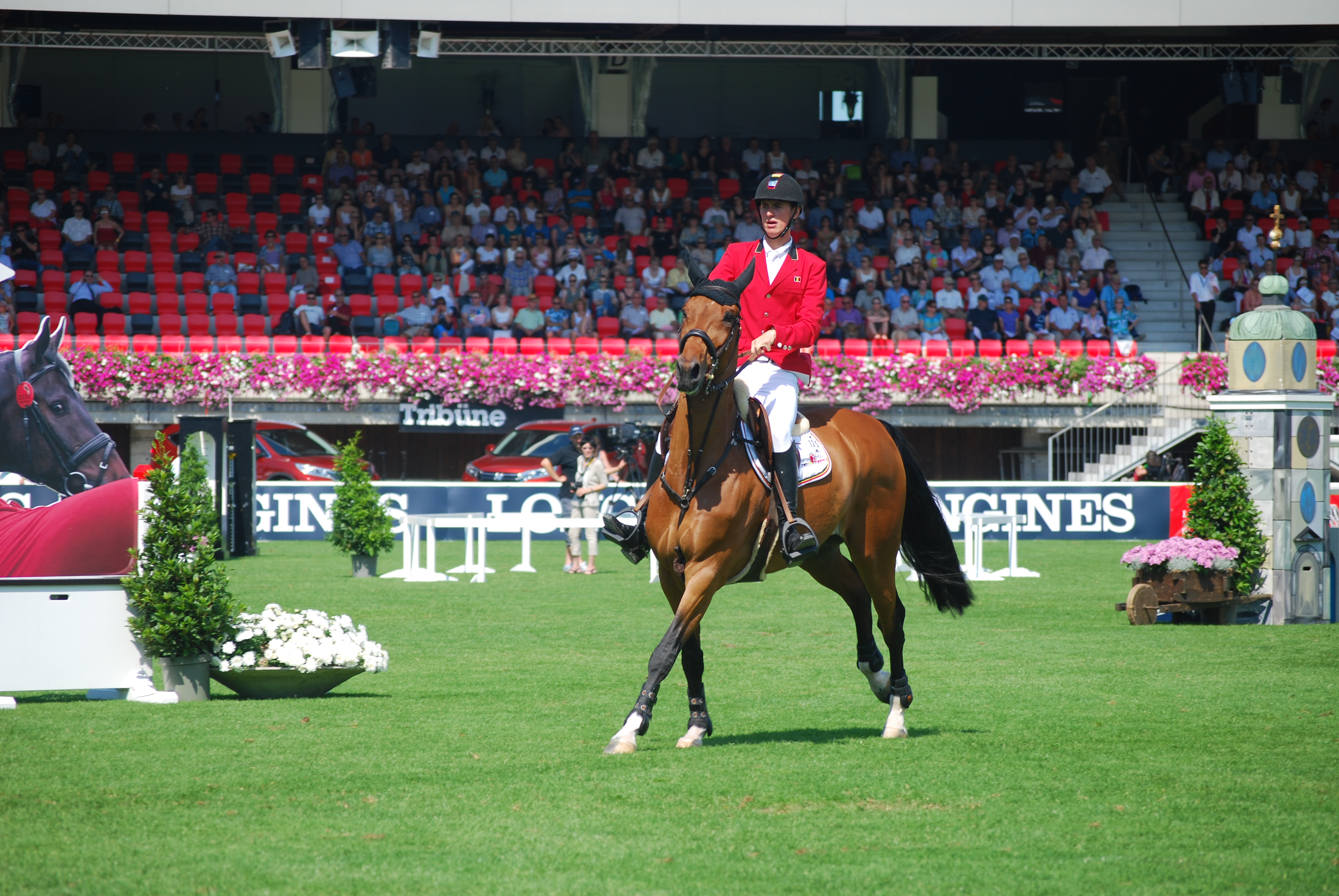
Jos Verlooy and Domino on the day of their victory at the CSIO St. Gallen, June 5, 2015.

Domino is awarded the EquiTime prize in 2015.

- March 22, 2015: 6th in the Grand Prix of the CSI4* in Braunschweig, at 1.55 m
- April 19, 2015: 5th individual at the 2014-2015 Show Jumping World Cup Final, in Las Vegas, on 1.60 m
- May 15, 2015: 4th in the Grand Prix of the Nations Cup stage (CSIO5*) in La Baule, on 1.60 m
- June 5, 2015: Winner of the Grand Prix of the Nations' Cup leg (CSIO5*) in St. Gallen, at 1.60 m
- June 28, 2015: 6th, CSI5* Knokke, at 1.60 m
- September 20, 2015: 12th in the Global Champions Tour leg (CSI5*) in Vienna, at 1.55 m
- October 3, 2015: 12th, CSI5* Los Angeles, at 1.50 m
- October 28, 2015: 4th in the World Cup leg (CSI4*-W) in Lexington, at 1.50 m
- November 14, 2015: Second in the World Cup stage (CSI3*-W) at 1.60 m in Las Vegas
- November 29, 2015: 12th in the World Cup stage (CSI5*-W) at 1.60 m in Madrid

=== In 2016 ===
- March 2016: 27th individual at the 2015-2016 Show Jumping World Cup final in Gothenburg
- May 7, 2016: 35th in the Grand Prix of the Global Champions Tour stage in Hamburg, at 1.60 m
- May 21, 2016: 27th in the Grand Prix of the Global Champions Tour stage in Madrid, at 1.60 m

=== In 2017 ===
- September 22, 2017: 7th in the CSI3* Knokke Grand Prix, at 1.55 m
- September 28, 2017: Second in the 1.45 m event at the Global Champions Tour Berlin leg

== Origins ==
Domino is a son of the stallion Thunder van de Zuuthoeve and the mare Queen d'Azur Middelstede, by Azur de Paulstra. He has 33.27 % Thoroughbred origins.

Pedigree of Domino van de Middelstede (2003)
Sire Thunder van de Zuuthoeve (1996-2015)	Argentinus (1980-2007)	Argentan I (1967)	Absatz (1960)
Sire Thunder van de Zuuthoeve (1996-2015)	Argentinus (1980-2007)	Argentan I (1967)	Worms (1960)
Sire Thunder van de Zuuthoeve (1996-2015)	Argentinus (1980-2007)	Dorle (1965)	Duden II (1960)
Sire Thunder van de Zuuthoeve (1996-2015)	Argentinus (1980-2007)	Dorle (1965)	Winterrose (1958)
Sire Thunder van de Zuuthoeve (1996-2015)	Jura van St Maarten (1993)	Nimmerdor (1972-2003)	Farn (1959)
Sire Thunder van de Zuuthoeve (1996-2015)	Jura van St Maarten (1993)	Nimmerdor (1972-2003)	Ramonaa (1963)
Sire Thunder van de Zuuthoeve (1996-2015)	Jura van St Maarten (1993)	Landlady (1987)	Lord (1967)
Sire Thunder van de Zuuthoeve (1996-2015)	Jura van St Maarten (1993)	Landlady (1987)	Fabiolis (1969)
Dam Queen d'Azur Middelstede (1993)	Azur de Paulstra (1988)	Grand Veneur (1972-1988)	Amour du Bois (1966-1979)
Dam Queen d'Azur Middelstede (1993)	Azur de Paulstra (1988)	Grand Veneur (1972-1988)	Tanagra (1963)
Dam Queen d'Azur Middelstede (1993)	Azur de Paulstra (1988)	Ombline de Paulstra (1980)	Jalisco B (1975-1994)
Dam Queen d'Azur Middelstede (1993)	Azur de Paulstra (1988)	Ombline de Paulstra (1980)	Célia de Paulstra (1968)
Dam Queen d'Azur Middelstede (1993)	Hendi (1984)	Narko II (1979)	Florissant (1971)
Dam Queen d'Azur Middelstede (1993)	Hendi (1984)	Narko II (1979)	Delle (1969)
Dam Queen d'Azur Middelstede (1993)	Hendi (1984)	Wendi (1976)	Etretat (1970)
Dam Queen d'Azur Middelstede (1993)	Hendi (1984)	Wendi (1976)	Paola (1969)
