= Totem de Brecey =

Gray Selle Français gelding (born 2007)

- Species: Horse
- Breed: Selle Français
- Sex: Male
- Born: April 24, 2007; Brécey
- Parents: Mylord Carthago and Jessy Landaise

Totem de Brecey (born on April 24, 2007) is a gray Selle Français gelding, ridden in eventing competitions by the French rider Christopher Six. It participated in the Tokyo Olympic Games in 2021 and won a bronze medal in the team event.

== History ==
It was born on April 24, 2007, at Jean Muris' stud farm in Brécey in the department of Manche, France. Muris is a well-known breeder in the region, who took over his father's farm, a former president of Cheval Normandie, who died in March 2021. Totem de Brecey was gelded on August 17, 2010.

It belongs to François and Juliane Souweine. Juliane Souweine, originally from Nantes, rides this horse at the amateur elite level and comes to Paris to train: it is there that she meets the rider Christopher Six, who begins to train her. He rides the horse when its owners need more time, but at first, he does not imagine that Totem de Brecey could reach the Olympic level. Christopher Six progresses through the levels of competition with Totem de Brecey.

Totem de Brecey first appeared on the French eventing team in 2018. It took part in the European Eventing Championships in 2019.

Christopher Six won the last Pro Elite eventing competition of the 2020 season with this horse in September. He became vice-champion of France in Pro Elite. In April 2021, he secured the Pro Elite championship in Pompadour.

=== Participation in the Tokyo 2020 Olympic Games ===
At the 2020 Summer Olympics in Tokyo, it won the bronze medal in the team event with its rider Christopher Six.

== Description ==
Totem de Brecey is a gray gelding registered in the French Selle Français studbook. It measured 1.58 meters at the age of two.

Christopher Six describes it as a very fast horse, with blood and good jumping quality. He also describes it as "very nice," with a good temperament, and not easily upset.

It had some apprehension at ford crossings at the beginning of its training.

== Achievements ==
It achieved an eventing competition index (ICC) of 158 in 2018.

== Origins ==
This horse is sired by the stallion Mylord Carthago. Its dam Jessy Landaise is a daughter of the French Selle Français stallion Quouglof Rouge (stud farm des Rouges).

Pedigree of Totem de Brecey
Sire Mylord Carthago 2000 - Selle français Gray, 1.71 m	Carthago; 1987 - 2013; Holsteiner	Capitol I 1975, Holsteiner	Capitano
Sire Mylord Carthago 2000 - Selle français Gray, 1.71 m	Carthago; 1987 - 2013; Holsteiner	Capitol I 1975, Holsteiner	Folia
Sire Mylord Carthago 2000 - Selle français Gray, 1.71 m	Carthago; 1987 - 2013; Holsteiner	Perra; Holsteiner	Calando I
Sire Mylord Carthago 2000 - Selle français Gray, 1.71 m	Carthago; 1987 - 2013; Holsteiner	Perra; Holsteiner	Kerrin
Sire Mylord Carthago 2000 - Selle français Gray, 1.71 m	Fragance de Chalus; 1996 - Selle français	Jalisco B 1975, Selle français	Almé
Sire Mylord Carthago 2000 - Selle français Gray, 1.71 m	Fragance de Chalus; 1996 - Selle français	Jalisco B 1975, Selle français	Tanagra
Sire Mylord Carthago 2000 - Selle français Gray, 1.71 m	Fragance de Chalus; 1996 - Selle français	Nifrane; 1979, Selle français	Fury de la Cense
Sire Mylord Carthago 2000 - Selle français Gray, 1.71 m	Fragance de Chalus; 1996 - Selle français	Nifrane; 1979, Selle français	Ifrane
Dam Jessy Landaise 1997 - Selle français Bay	Quouglof Rouge; 1982 - Selle français	Kouglof II; 1976, Selle français	Nankin
Dam Jessy Landaise 1997 - Selle français Bay	Quouglof Rouge; 1982 - Selle français	Kouglof II; 1976, Selle français	Beloukia
Dam Jessy Landaise 1997 - Selle français Bay	Quouglof Rouge; 1982 - Selle français	Verboise; 1965, Selle français	Centaure du Bois
Dam Jessy Landaise 1997 - Selle français Bay	Quouglof Rouge; 1982 - Selle français	Verboise; 1965, Selle français	Lorette
Dam Jessy Landaise 1997 - Selle français Bay	Abeille landaise 1988 - Selle français	Starter; 1962, Selle français	Rantzau
Dam Jessy Landaise 1997 - Selle français Bay	Abeille landaise 1988 - Selle français	Starter; 1962, Selle français	Kaironnaise
Dam Jessy Landaise 1997 - Selle français Bay	Abeille landaise 1988 - Selle français	Olivette landaise 1980, Selle français	Sr Brendan
Dam Jessy Landaise 1997 - Selle français Bay	Abeille landaise 1988 - Selle français	Olivette landaise 1980, Selle français	Belladonna

== Bibliography ==
- de Danne, Caroline (February 14, 2021). "Totem de Brecey, du cheval d'amateur au prétendant olympique". grandprix.info, Grand Prix magazine (in French).
- MacMillan, Kim (August 3, 2021). "HI Tokyo Olympics Daily Update: Eventing Concludes As Jumpers Move In". Horse illustrated.
