= Bingo du Parc =

Show jumping stallion

- Breed: Selle Français
- Sire: Mylord Carthago
- Dam: Tsigane Semilly
- Sex: Male
- Color: Chestnut

Bingo du Parc (born on May 11, 2011) is a Selle Français gelding with a chestnut coat, ridden in show jumping by the Dutch rider Harrie Smolders. He notably participated in the Tokyo Olympics in 2021.

== History ==
He was born on May 11, 2011, at André Herouart's stud farm in Escolives-Sainte-Camille.

He has been ridden by the Dutch rider Harrie Smolders since September 2020. Smolders, faced with the retirements of his horses Don VHP Z and Emerald, had to prepare a replacement for the Olympics in a few months. Initially, Smolders, selected for the Dutch team, planned to take his horse Dolinn N.O.P. to Tokyo. Ultimately, Smolders takes Bingo, becoming a substitute for the Dutch show jumping team.

=== Participation in the Tokyo 2020 Olympics ===
Smolders and Bingo du Parc replace Willem Greve and his mount during the team qualifying event at the Tokyo Olympics. Bingo, less tired than most other competing horses, completes a faultless course, allowing the Netherlands to maintain a total team score of 9 points.

== Description ==
Bingo du Parc is a chestnut gelding registered in the Selle Français stud-book.

== Achievements ==
He achieved a show jumping index (ISO) of 166 in 2020.

== Origins ==
He is a son of the stallion Mylord Carthago. His mother, Tsigane Semilly, is a daughter of the Selle Français stallion Diamant de Semilly.

Pedigree of Bingo du Parc (2011)
Sire Mylord Carthago (2000)	Carthago (1987-2013)	Capitol I (1975-1999)	Capitano (1968)
Sire Mylord Carthago (2000)	Carthago (1987-2013)	Capitol I (1975-1999)	Folia (1969)
Sire Mylord Carthago (2000)	Carthago (1987-2013)	Perra (1978)	Calando I (1974)
Sire Mylord Carthago (2000)	Carthago (1987-2013)	Perra (1978)	Kerrin (1973)
Sire Mylord Carthago (2000)	Fragance de Chalus (1993-2019)	Jalisco B (1975-1994)	Almé (1966-1991)
Sire Mylord Carthago (2000)	Fragance de Chalus (1993-2019)	Jalisco B (1975-1994)	Tanagra (1963)
Sire Mylord Carthago (2000)	Fragance de Chalus (1993-2019)	Nifrane (1979)	Fury de la Cense (1971)
Sire Mylord Carthago (2000)	Fragance de Chalus (1993-2019)	Nifrane (1979)	Ifrane (1974)
Dam Tsigane Semilly (2007)	Diamant de Semilly (1991-2022)	Le Tot de Semilly (1977-2008)	Grand Veneur (1972-1988)
Dam Tsigane Semilly (2007)	Diamant de Semilly (1991-2022)	Le Tot de Semilly (1977-2008)	Venue du Tot (1965)
Dam Tsigane Semilly (2007)	Diamant de Semilly (1991-2022)	Venise des Cresles (1987-1991)	Elf III (1970-1991)
Dam Tsigane Semilly (2007)	Diamant de Semilly (1991-2022)	Venise des Cresles (1987-1991)	Miss des Cresles (1978-1989)
Dam Tsigane Semilly (2007)	No info	No info	No info
Dam Tsigane Semilly (2007)	No info	No info	No info
Dam Tsigane Semilly (2007)	No info	No info	No info
Dam Tsigane Semilly (2007)	No info	No info	No info
