= Jos Lansink =

Belgian equestrian (born 1961)

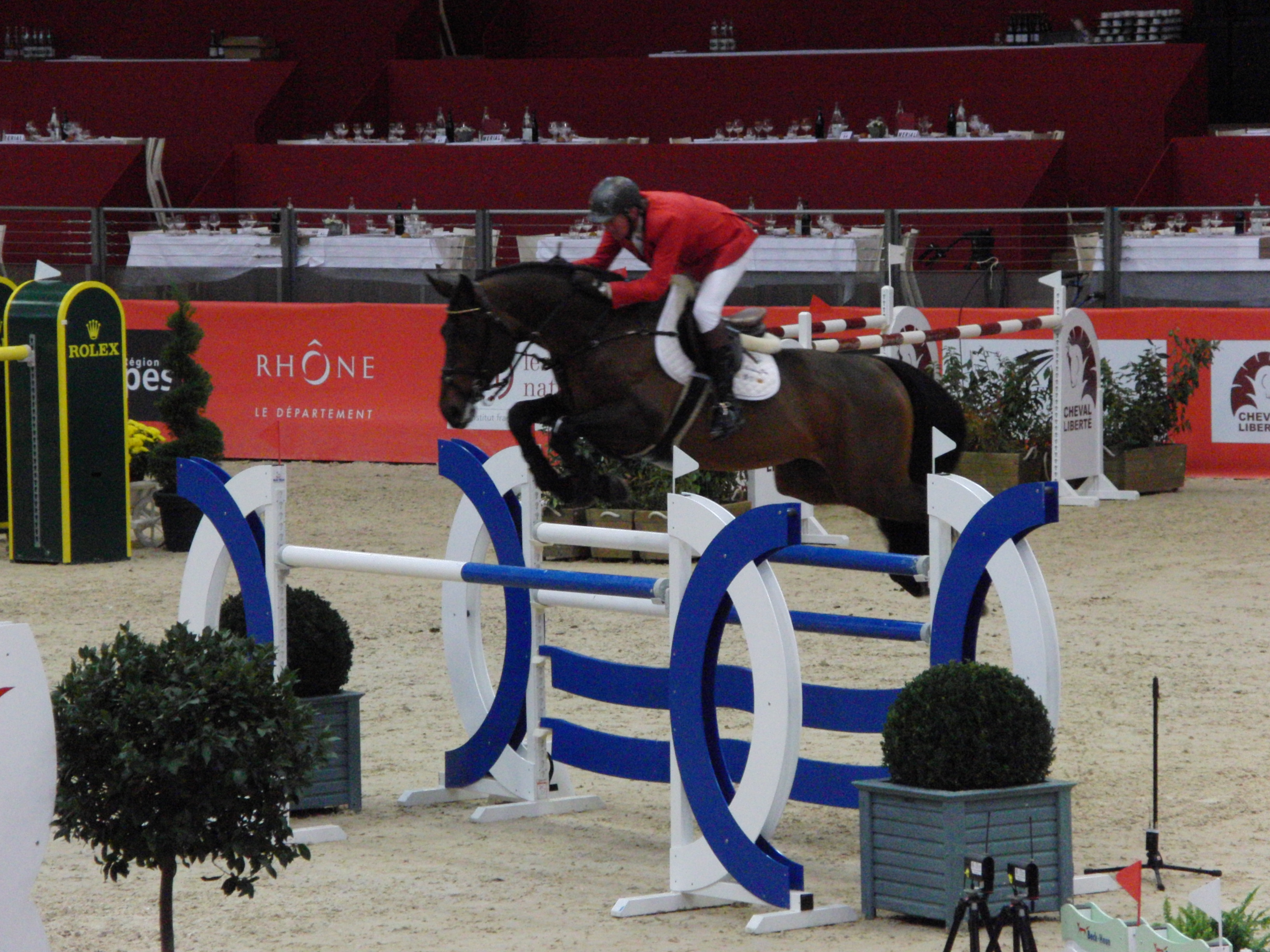
- Jos Lansink and Spender S at the CSI 5*-W Equita' Lyon 2010

Medal record

Equestrian

Representing Belgium

World Championships
Gold medal – first place	2006 Aachen	Individual
Bronze medal – third place	2002 Jerez	Team jumping
Bronze medal – third place	2010 Lexington	Team jumping

European Championships
Silver medal – second place	2007 Mannheim	Individual

Representing the Netherlands

Olympic Games
Gold medal – first place	1992 Barcelona	Team jumping

European Championships
Gold medal – first place	1991 La Baule	Team jumping
Silver medal – second place	1997 Mannheim	Team jumping
Bronze medal – third place	1989 Rotterdam	Individual
Bronze medal – third place	1991 La Baule	Individual
Bronze medal – third place	1999 Hickstead	Team jumping

Jozeph Johannes Gerardus Marinus "Jos" Lansink (born 19 March 1961 in Weerselo) is an equestrian from the Netherlands, currently representing Belgium, who competes in the sport of show jumping.

Lansink has competed in six Olympic games, four for the Netherlands and two for Belgium. He first rode in the 1988 Seoul Olympics, tying for 7th individually and taking 5th with his team. In 1992 at the Barcelona Olympics he did not place individually, but the Dutch team won the gold. At the 1996 Atlanta Olympics he tied for 11th individually and the Dutch team took 7th. In 2000 in Sydney he tied for 20th place while riding for the Netherlands for the last time, and his team took 7th. In 2004 he began riding for Belgium at the 2004 Athens Olympics. He did not place in the individual competition, but the Belgian team took home 6th. At the 2008 Beijing Olympics he tied for 10th individually, and did not ride in the team competition. He took part in both the individual and team jumping events at the 2012 Olympics.

Lansink began riding at the age of three. He began to rise to international prominence in 1988 on Felix, winning a few grand prix competitions before taking part in the 1988 Olympic Games. In 1994 he won the World Cup Final on Libero, and on Caridor he took home a team bronze medal at the 2002 World Championships, finishing 6th individually. In 2004 he began his own stable. In 2006, riding the stallion Cumano, he took home the world championship. In 2009 he was the runner up for the Global Champions Tour Final. He currently competes in the Global Champions Tour for Belgium.

== See also ==
- Domino van de Middelstede
- Mylord Carthago
- Carthago
