= Mylord Carthago =

Show jumping horse from France

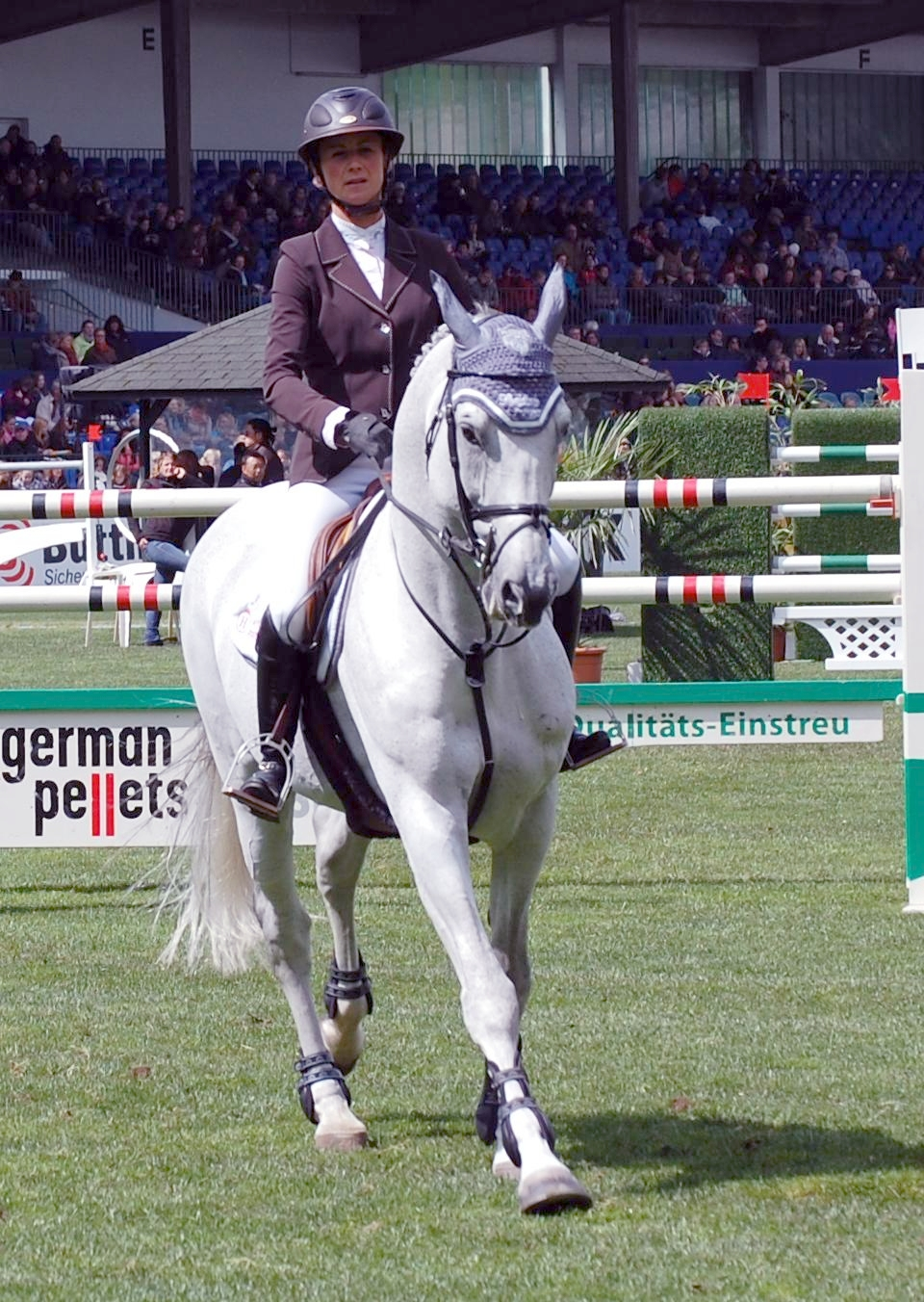
- Mylord Carthago ridden by Pénélope Leprévost in 2012
- Breed: Selle Français
- Discipline: Show jumping
- Sire: Carthago Z
- Dam: Fragrance de Chalus
- Sex: Stallion
- Foaled: 26 June 2000 (age 25)
- Country: France
- Rider: Pénélope Leprevost

Mylord Carthago (Mylord Carthago*HN until 2014) is a gray Selle Français stallion and show jumping champion. Descended from Almé Z and sired by the Holsteiner stallion Carthago Z, his potential was recognized early on. At the age of seven, he was entrusted to French rider Pénélope Leprevost, who trained him. The pair went on to win European and World show jumping runner-up titles in 2010 and 2012. Mylord was also one of France's last national stallions and the threat of his sale from France in 2014 led to negative reactions from the show jumping public and political figures. Diagnosed with cervical osteoarthritis, Mylord was retired from jumping in 2014 to be a full-time breeding stallion.

== Life ==
Mylord Carthago was conceived by embryo transfer by owners Paule and Jean-Louis Bourdy Dubois and was born on June 26, 2000. He is the offspring of Holsteiner stallion Carthago Z and the Selle Français mare Fragrance de Chalus. He is a Franco-German horse, although registered in the Selle Français studbook. The Haras Nationaux in France bought him in 2005 and entrusted him to rider Emmanuel Vincent, who put him through the classic cycle and spotted his potential. In 2007, the stallion joined show jumping rider Pénélope Leprevost, who gradually made him her top horse. In her book, Pénélope says her career owes a great deal to Mylord, whom she was able to "build the way she wanted". Mylord's talents gave her access to international events.

They won numerous international competitions between 2010 and 2012, including a team silver medal at the 2010 World Equestrian Games, a team silver medal at the 2011 European Show Jumping Championships in Madrid, and the Aachen leg of the 2012 Nations Cup. That same year, the stallion's show jumping index was 178. In his book Galops, writer Jérôme Garcin describes the emotion of the Equidia Life team when they met Pénélope Leprévost and her horse in private.

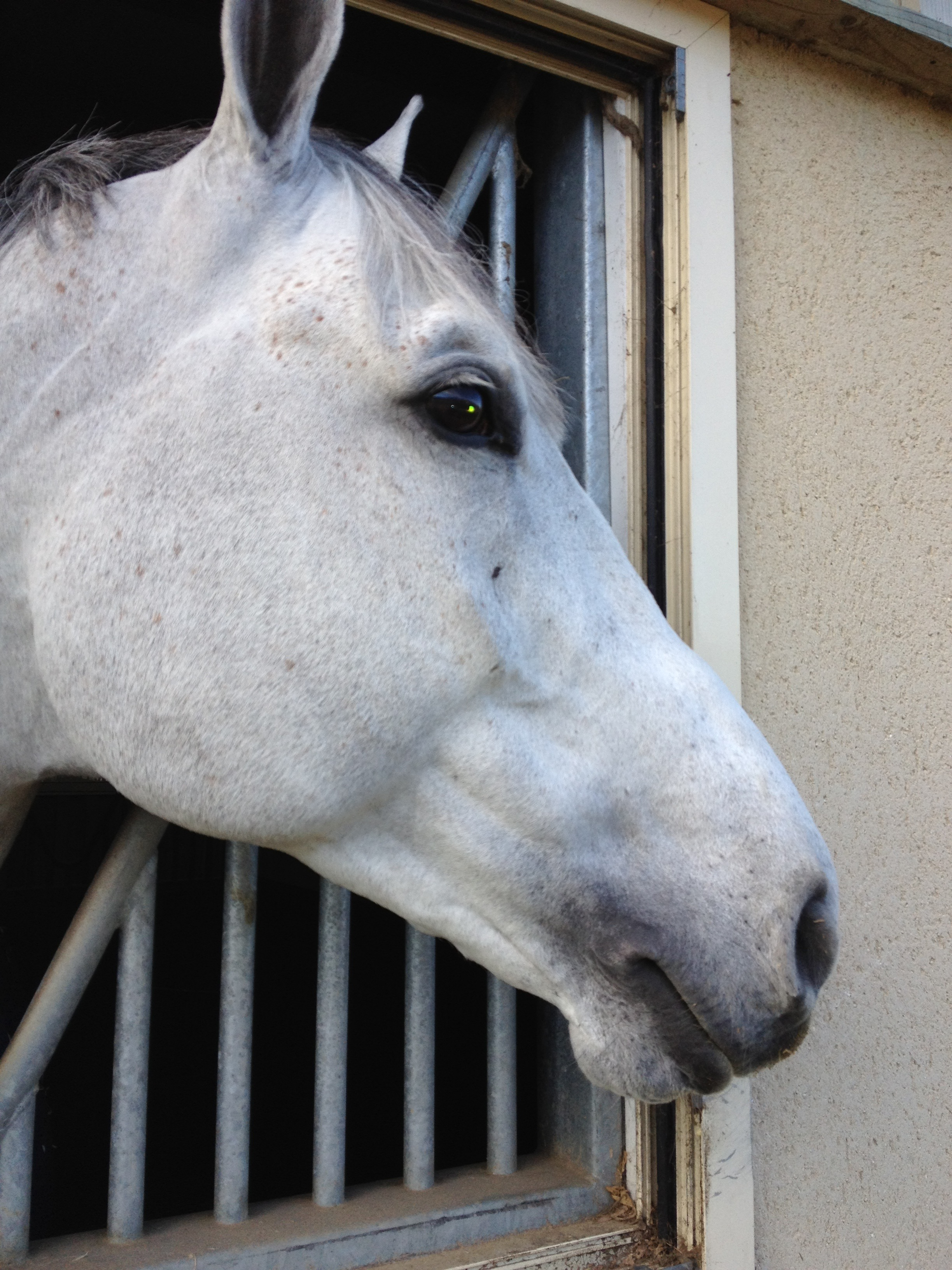
Mylord Carthago (2012)

Mylord injured his pastern during the winter of 2012–2013 and was not competing. His absence, and the upcoming closure of Haras Nationaux, led to rumors he had been sold. He appeared in more modest competitions during 2013. Doubts were mounting about his return to top competition, and his groom put a lot of effort into getting him back in shape. At the end of 2013, after a series of tests, he was gradually put back to work. In 2014, he returned to his highest level, winning the RMC Grand Prix at the Jumping International de France. However, he did not take part in the 2014 FEI World Equestrian Games.

On May 22, 2014, the national stud farms announce the sale of the last French national sport stallions, and among them Mylord Carthago. The announcement provoked strong reactions from the equestrian community internationally. Pénélope Leprévost learned of the sale and met with Jacques Myard to try and get the sale cancelled. The agency responsible for the sale issued a press release on June 3, specifying that Mylord Carthago would remain with his rider until sold, would have to wear the French colors and could not be tested under saddle. Philippe Martin, president of the Fédération nationale des éleveurs de chevaux de sport (National Federation of Sport Horse Breeders), denounced the sale as a "state scandal". Just as the stallion's departure for Germany was announced, the sale was cancelled thanks to the initiative of two French veterinarians, who set up a private company. In an interview with France 3, these vets explained their action by the fact that "the semen of these horses is something of a national treasure".

The stallion has been suffering from the onset of cervical osteoarthritis which compromised his performance. On December 6, 2014 at a special event at the Paris Horse Show, Leprévost announced to an emotional audience that the horse would be retiring to her home in Normandy.

== Description ==
Mylord Carthago is a gray Selle Français stallion. He stands 1.71 m tall. According to Leprévost, he's a horse who gives a lot to his rider, and wants to get ahead. He is an energetic, very sensitive animal, and has great style over jumps. Leprévost insists on his "kindness" and the quality of his mind, testifying that he has never refused to jump a fence, even in training. According to her, he is gifted with excellent learning faculties, an intelligence that is also evident in his dual career as a competitor and breeder.

== Achievements ==
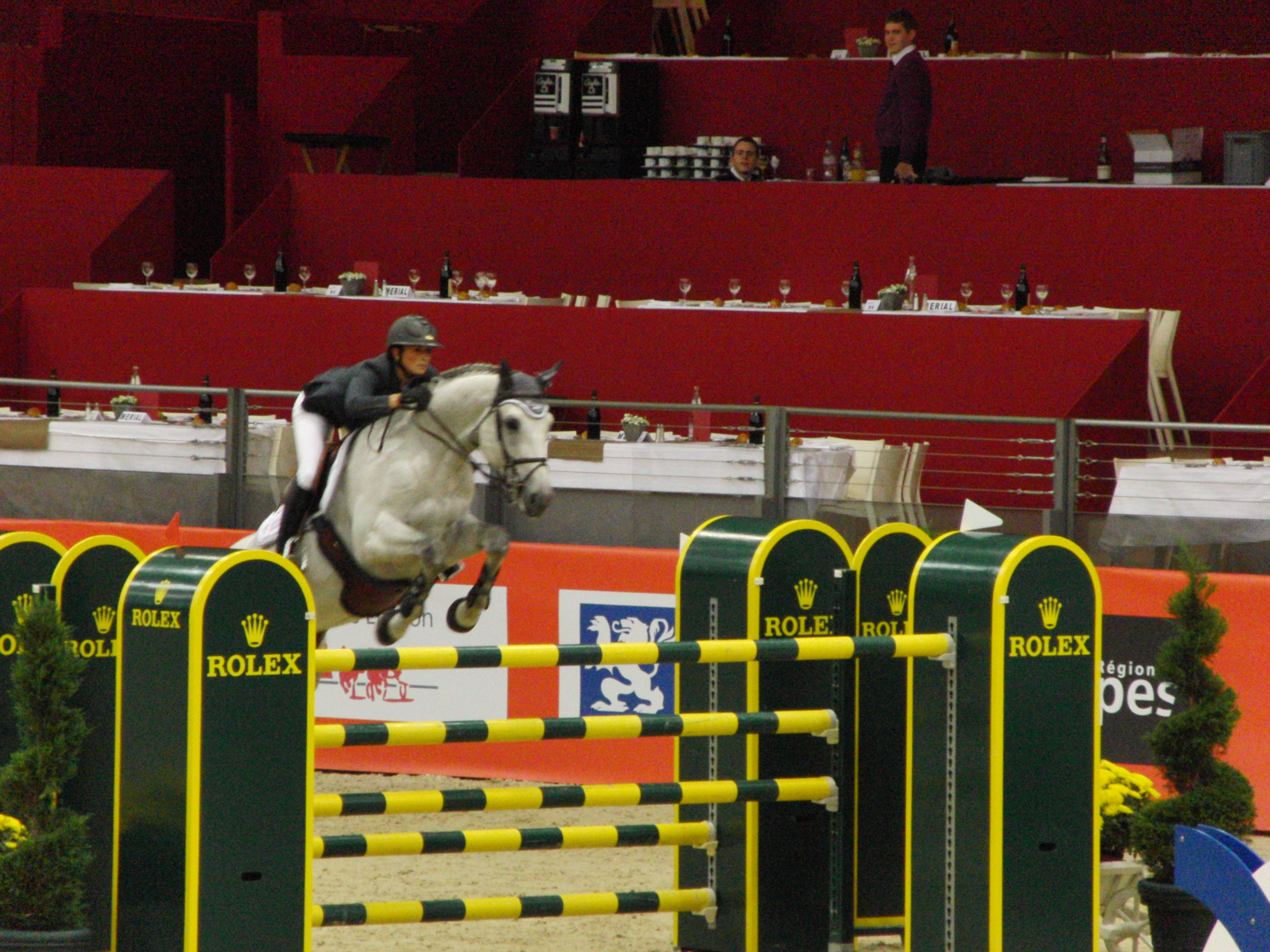
Pénélope Leprevost and Mylord Carthago at the CSIW5* Prix Equidia at Equita'Lyon, France, 2010

Over the years, Mylord Carthago has built up a national and then international record of achievements. From 2004 to 2006, he completed the classic cycle for French show jumping horses.

2007

- 7th in the French championship for seven-year-olds at Fontainebleau
- 4th in the World Championship for seven-year-olds in Lanaken.

2008

- Winner of the Grand National de Saint-Lô.
- Ranked in the CSI4* in Chantilly.

2009

- Classed in the CSI 5* Grand Prix in Cannes and Hickstead, and the World Cup Grand Prix in London and Mechelen.

2010

- 3rd in the Leipzig leg of the Show Jumping World Cup competition.
- Winner of the Saut Hermès.
- Winner of FEI Nations Cup in Rome.
- Team silver medal at the FEI World Equestrian Games in Lexington.
- 5th in the Rolex Top Ten in Geneva.

2011

- Winner of the Grand Prix at the Gucci Masters in Paris.
- Team silver medal at the European Jumping Championships in Madrid.
- Second in the CSIO 5* Grand Prix in La Baule.
- Winner CSI5* Villepinte.

2012

Ranked 31st in the WBFSH world show jumping rankings in October 2012.

- Winner of the CSI5*, Global Champions Tour stage in Vienna.
- Winner of the Aachen Nations' Cup.
- Winner of the Grand Prix de la Ville at the CSI 5* W in Helsinki.
- Third in the Nations Cup in Rotterdam.
- Second in the Grand Prix of the CSIO 5* in Gijón.
- Fourth in the CSI 5*-W Grand Prix in Verona.
- Fifth, CSI 5* Villepinte.
- Sixth in Grand Prix CSI 5* Geneva.
- Participation in the London Olympic Games.

2014

- Winner of the CSIO 5* La Baule Grand Prix.
- Second in the 1.55 m class at the Hamburg CSI 5*.
- Sixth in the Nations Cup in Aachen.
- Thirteenth in the CSI 5* Chantilly Grand Prix.
- His last competition was the CSIO 5* in Calgary on September 12, 2014, during which he was eliminated.

== Pedigree ==
Mylord Carthago's sire, Carthago Z, had an international show jumping career at the highest level with Jos Lansink. His dam, the brood mare Fragrance de Chalus, is a descendant of Jalisco B and Almé Z.

Pedigree of Mylord Carthago (2000)
Sire Carthago (1987-2013)	Capitol I (1975-1999)	Capitano (1968)	Corporal (1963)
Sire Carthago (1987-2013)	Capitol I (1975-1999)	Capitano (1968)	Retina (1952)
Sire Carthago (1987-2013)	Capitol I (1975-1999)	Folia (1969)	Maximus (1963)
Sire Carthago (1987-2013)	Capitol I (1975-1999)	Folia (1969)	Vase (1961)
Sire Carthago (1987-2013)	Perra (1978)	Calando I (1974)	Cor de la Bryère (1968-2000)
Sire Carthago (1987-2013)	Perra (1978)	Calando I (1974)	Furgund (1969)
Sire Carthago (1987-2013)	Perra (1978)	Kerrin (1973)	Mambo (1969)
Sire Carthago (1987-2013)	Perra (1978)	Kerrin (1973)	Fangelika (1969)
Dam Fragance de Chalus (1993-2019)	Jalisco B (1975-1994)	Almé (1966-1991)	Ibrahim (1952-1973)
Dam Fragance de Chalus (1993-2019)	Jalisco B (1975-1994)	Almé (1966-1991)	Girondine (1950)
Dam Fragance de Chalus (1993-2019)	Jalisco B (1975-1994)	Tanagra (1963)	Furioso (1939-1967)
Dam Fragance de Chalus (1993-2019)	Jalisco B (1975-1994)	Tanagra (1963)	Délicieuse (1947)
Dam Fragance de Chalus (1993-2019)	Nifrane (1979)	Fury de la Cense (1971)	Questeur (1960-1974)
Dam Fragance de Chalus (1993-2019)	Nifrane (1979)	Fury de la Cense (1971)	N'y touche pas C (1957)
Dam Fragance de Chalus (1993-2019)	Nifrane (1979)	Ifrane (1974)	No info
Dam Fragance de Chalus (1993-2019)	Nifrane (1979)	Ifrane (1974)	No info

== Stud career ==
Mylord Carthago has the potential to become a great breeding stallion, as his foals are starting to compete at the highest level. Since 2011, the quality of his progeny has been evident, particularly when paired with compact mares possessing strong backs. Six-year-old champions Timon d'Anse and Traviata du Lesme are among his offspring. In 2013, Mylord was voted 4th best sire of young horses. He is the sire of Twentytwo des Biches.

Mylord Carthago (2000)	Totem de Brecey (2007)
Mylord Carthago (2000)	Twentytwo Biches (2007)
Mylord Carthago (2000)	Bingo du Parc (2011)
Mylord Carthago (2000)	Cocaïne du Val (2012)

== See also ==
- Carthago
- Twentytwo des Biches
