= FEI World Cup Jumping 2014/2015 =

Competition

The 2014–15 FEI Show Jumping World Cup is an annual international competition among the world's best show jumping horses and riders 2014–15 season. The series features boats which feature at the Olympics.

== World Cup program ==
Date	Country	Show
October 19, 2014	Norway	Oslo
October 26, 2014	Finland	Helsinki
November 2, 2014	France	Lyon
November 9, 2014	Italy	Verona
November 23, 2014	Germany	Stuttgart
November 30, 2014	Spain	Madrid
December 21, 2014	United Kingdom	London
December 30, 2014	Belgium	Mechelen
January 18, 2015	Germany	Leipzig
January 25, 2015	Switzerland	Zürich
February 7, 2015	France	Bordeaux
March 1, 2015	Sweden	Gothenburg
April 16–19, 2015	United States	Las Vegas

== Results ==
Event:	Gold:	Points	Silver:	Points	Bronze:	Points
Oslo	(Netherlands) Jur Vrieling; Horse: VDL Zirocco Blue	20	(Germany) Marco Kutscher; Horse: Cornet's Cristallo	17	(Switzerland) Steve Guerdat; Horse: Nino des Buissonnets	15
Helsinki	(Switzerland) Steve Guerdat; Horse: Nino des Buissonnets	20	(Switzerland); Martin Fuchs; Horse: PSG Future	17	(Switzerland); Pius Schwizer; Horse: Sixtine de Vains	15
Lyon	(France) Roger-Yves Bost; Horse: Quod'Coeur de la Loge	20	(Netherlands) Wout-Jan van der Schans; Horse: Capetown	17	(Germany) Hans-Dieter Dreher; Horse: Embassy II	15
Verona	(Republic of Ireland) Bertram Allen; Horse: Molly Malone V	20	(Netherlands) Maikel van der Vleuten; Horse: VDL Groep Verdi	17	(Germany) Marcus Ehning; Horse: Cornado NRW	15
Stuttgart	(United Kingdom) William Whitaker; Horse: Fandango	20	(United States) Lucy Davis; Horse: Barron	17	(Switzerland) Steve Guerdat; Horse: Nino des Buissonnets	15
Madrid	(Colombia) Carlos Lopez; Horse: Prince de la Mare	20	(Australia) Edwina Tops-Alexander; Horse: Lantea Tequilla	17	(France) Alexandre Fontanelle; Horse: Prime Time des Vagues	15
London	(Germany) Marco Kutscher; Horse: Cornet's Cristallo	20	(Germany) Daniel Deußer; Horse: Carriere	17	(Sweden) Malin Baryard-Johnsson; Horse: H&M Tornesch	15
Mechelen	(France) Simon Delestre; Horse: Qlassic Bois Margot	20	(United Kingdom) Joe Clee; Horse: Utamaro d'Ecaussines	17	(Sweden) Douglas Lindelöw; Horse: Casello	15
Leipzig	(Germany) Hans-Dieter Dreher; Horse: Embassy II	20	(Norway) Geir Gulliksen; Horse: Edesa S Banjan	17	(Italy) Luca Maria Moneta; Horse: Connery	15
Zürich	(Spain) Sergio Álvarez Moya; Horse: Carlo	20	(Republic of Ireland) Bertram Allen; Horse: Molly Malone V	17	(Sweden) Rolf-Göran Bengtsson; Horse: Casall ASK	15
Bordeaux	(Republic of Ireland) Bertram Allen; Horse: Romanov	20	(Germany) Ludger Beerbaum; Horse: Chaman	17	(Germany) Marcus Ehning; Horse: Singular La Silla	15
Gothenburg	(Switzerland) Steve Guerdat; Horse: Albfuehren's Paille	20	(Sweden) Rolf-Göran Bengtsson; Horse: Casall ASK	17	(Germany) Marco Kutscher; Horse: Cornet's Cristallo	15
Las Vegas Final	(Switzerland) Steve Guerdat; Horse: Albfuehren's Paille		(France) Pénélope Leprevost; Horse: Vagabond de la Pomme		(Republic of Ireland) Bertram Allen; Horse: Molly Malone V	
