= Audrey Coulter =

American equestrian

Audrey Coulter is an equestrian who has won several major horse jumping competitions. She is the daughter of financier James Coulter and Penny Coulter.

== Early life ==
Audrey began riding horses when she was three years old, living with her family in the suburbs of Woodside on the San Francisco Peninsula. She and her sister Saer rode for years at Millennium Farms, which belonged to their neighbors across the street. Audrey was showing and jumping horses by the time she was seven.

== Personal life ==
Audrey graduated from Dartmouth College in 2015 with a degree in Economics and minor in Chemistry. Her LinkedIn profile indicates that after her showjumping career with Copernicus Stables, she worked for Goldman Sachs for a period of time, and is currently working with HEALTH[at]SCALE Technologies.

== Equestrian career ==
Audrey had many successes early in her horse jumping career, starting from an early age. She earned a Team Silver at the North American Junior Championships in 2010 and placed fourth in the Randolph College/USEF National Junior Jumper Individual Championship. At age 18 she was one of six American young riders invited to contest the European Youngster Cup, which was held along with the World Cup Show Jumping Finals in Leipzig, Germany in late April 2011. She finished in 12th place riding Victory DA.

In 2014, at age 21, she won the $280,000 Adequan Grand Prix at the FTI Consulting Winter Equestrian Festival at the Palm Beach International Equestrian Center in Wellington, Fla. on a horse called Acorte (an eleven-year old Hanoverian mare who had previously showed successfully with Rolf Moormann). Audrey finished in 40.51 seconds, knocking out the 1st and 2nd ranked riders in the world who finished 2nd (Ben Maher on Ursula XII in 41.10 seconds) and 3rd (Scott Brash on Cella in 41.31 seconds) behind her. Later that same afternoon, she won the $84,000 Suncast 1.50m Championship Jumper classic with Victory DA, and was later named Leading Lady Grand Prix Rider for week seven of the festival. Her coaches at the time were Meredith Michaels-Beerbaum and Markus Beerbaum of Germany.

In 2015, she was one of four riders on the United States team that earned 10th place at the 2015 CSIO Gijón, with Audrey riding Capital Colnardo. She took 2nd place riding a horse named Domino, who she said was a "relatively new mount" for her at the time, at the Longines FEI World Cup qualifier in Las Vegas that same year. She and Capital Colnado later took third place in the Longines International Grand Prix in Dublin in July 2016. Later that year, she and Capital Colnardo had their first major class win in 2016 in the $100,000 Longines FEI World Cup at the Sacramento International Horse Show in a course designed by 2016 Rio Olympic showjumping course designer, Guilherme Jorge.

== See also ==
- Domino van de Middelstede
