= Twentytwo des Biches =

Show jumping mare

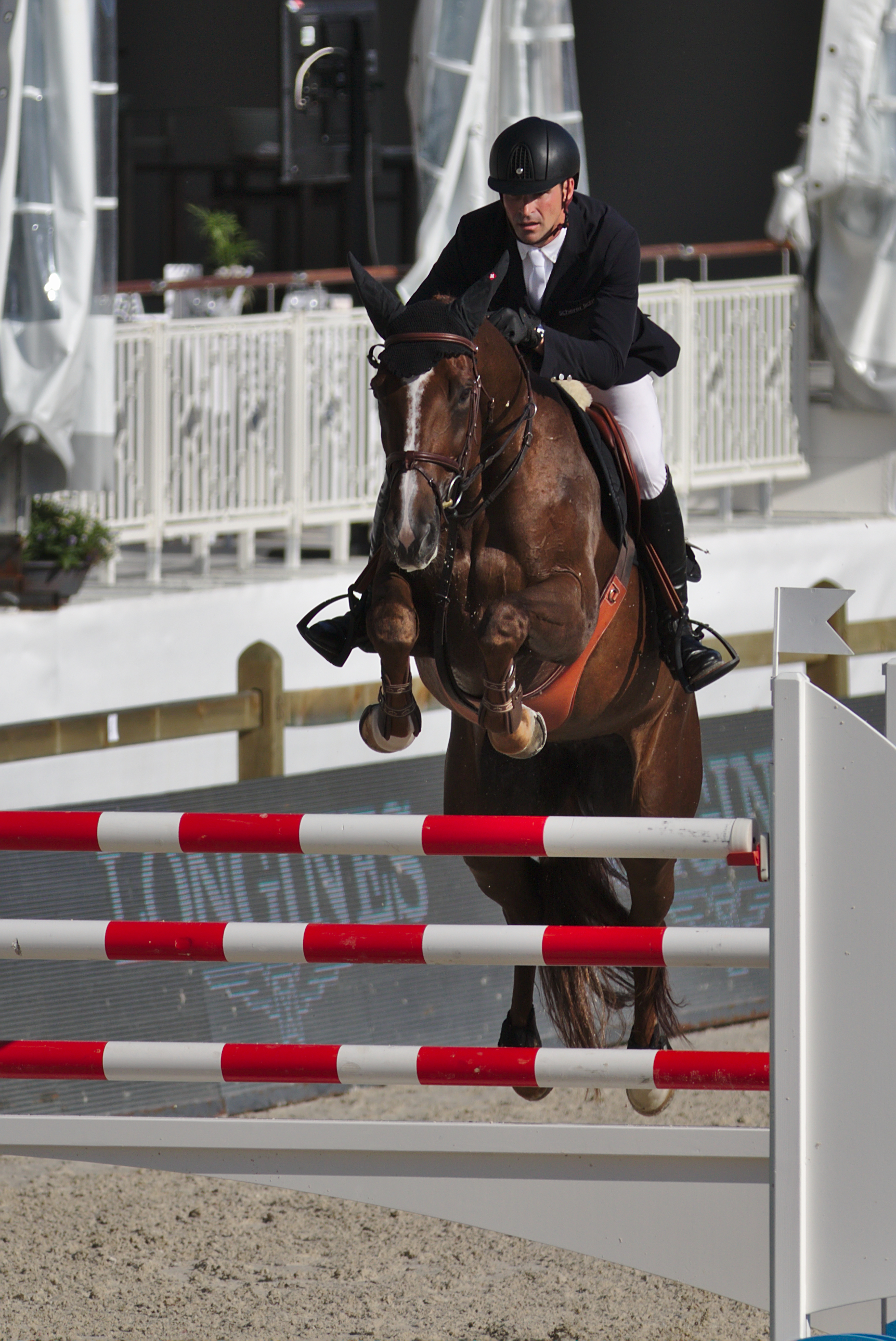
- Breed: Selle Français
- Sire: Mylord Carthago
- Sex: Female
- Foaled: Notre-Dame-d'Estrées
- Color: Chestnut

Twentytwo des Biches (born on May 27, 2007) is a chestnut mare, bred in the French Selle Français studbook, ridden in show jumping by the Franco-Swiss rider Romain Duguet. This offspring of Mylord Carthago won the silver medal individually during the final of the 2016-2017 Show Jumping World Cup.

== History ==
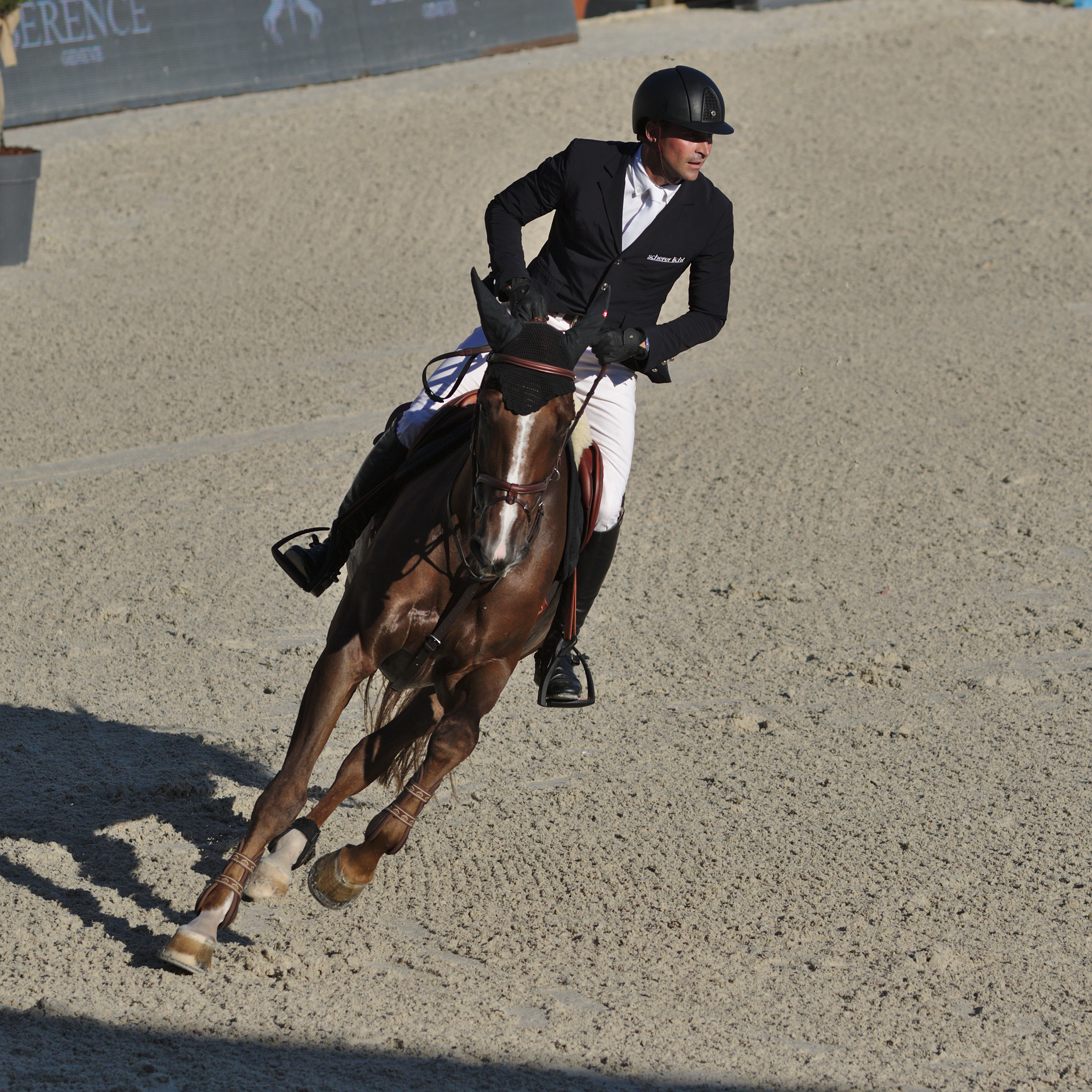
Romain Duguet and Twentytwo des Biches at the International Longines Horse-Show in Lausanne 2016.

Twentytwo des Biches' mother, Twenty One, is an old mare purchased by Mylène Martin at the age of 20, then destined for the slaughterhouse. Twentytwo is her last foal, born when the mare was 22 years old (hence her name, "twentytwo" meaning "twenty-two" in English). She was born on May 27, 2007, at Mylène Martin's breeding farm in Notre-Dame-d'Estrées, France. She wasn't pretty at birth, but she had a beautiful head, brilliant paces, and a pleasant character, very close to humans.

Reynald Angot, Felipe Posada, and Axel Van Colen rode her from the age of four, including in competitions. She placed 3rd in the grand final of Fontainebleau's classic cycle at six years old, then participated in the CSI2* of the Oliva tour. Romain Duguet heard about this mare from Axel Van Colen, acquired a part of her, then tried her under saddle and bought her entirely. He worked with her, making her his second competition horse after Quorida de Treho. She participated in the final of the Show Jumping World Cup in 2017 and unexpectedly won the silver medal, as Quorida was injured.

In September 2018, following his separation from Romain Duguet, Twentytwo's owner, Christiana Duguet, entrusted her to another Swiss rider, Bryan Basinger. The young rider performed poorly with the mare during the Tokyo Olympics, with 16 penalty points, dropping the Swiss show jumping team to eighth place in the provisional standings, depriving them of any chance of a medal.

== Description ==
Twentytwo des Biches is a chestnut mare registered in the Selle Français studbook.

== Achievements ==
- April 2017: Silver medal in the final of the 2016-2017 Show Jumping World Cup in Omaha.
- August 2017: Bronze medal by teams at the European Show Jumping Championship in Gothenburg.
- November 2017: Winner of the CSI4* in Samorin at 1.50m.
- March 2018: Winner of the Grand Palais Prize in Paris, at 1.45m.

== Origins ==
Twentytwo des Biches is by the stallion Mylord Carthago and the mare Twenty One, by Kalor du Bocage.

Pedigree of Twentytwo des Biches (2007)
| Sire Mylord Carthago (2000) | Carthago (1987-2013) | Capitol I (1975-1999) | Capitano (1968) |
| Sire Mylord Carthago (2000) | Carthago (1987-2013) | Capitol I (1975-1999) | Folia (1969) |
| Sire Mylord Carthago (2000) | Carthago (1987-2013) | Perra (1978) | Calando I (1974) |
| Sire Mylord Carthago (2000) | Carthago (1987-2013) | Perra (1978) | Kerrin (1973) |
| Sire Mylord Carthago (2000) | Fragante de Chalus (1993-2019) | Jalisco B (1975-1994) | Almé (1966-1991) |
| Sire Mylord Carthago (2000) | Fragante de Chalus (1993-2019) | Jalisco B (1975-1994) | Tanagra (1963) |
| Sire Mylord Carthago (2000) | Fragante de Chalus (1993-2019) | Nifrane (1979) | Fury de la Cense (1971) |
| Sire Mylord Carthago (2000) | Fragante de Chalus (1993-2019) | Nifrane (1979) | Ifrane (1974) |
| Dam No info | No info | No info | No info |
| Dam No info | No info | No info | No info |
| Dam No info | No info | No info | No info |
| Dam No info | No info | No info | No info |
| Dam No info | No info | No info | No info |
| Dam No info | No info | No info | No info |
| Dam No info | No info | No info | No info |
| Dam No info | No info | No info | No info |
