= Carthago (show jumping horse) =

Show jumping stallion from Germany

Carthago (also Carthago Z)
- Breed: Holsteiner
- Sire: Capitol I
- Dam: Perra
- Sex: Male
- Foaled: 1987; Germany
- Died: 21 May 2013
- Color: Gray

Carthago (b. 1987, d. May 21, 2013) was a gray stallion of the Holsteiner studbook, ridden in show jumping by Bo Kristoferrssen and then Jos Lansink, with whom he won the Aachen, Rotterdam and La Baule Nations Cups. He is considered one of the best sons of Capitol I. He in turn became an important sire, notably of Mylord Carthago.

== History ==
He was born in 1987 at Erhard Krampitz's stud in Schleswig-Holstein, Germany. He obtained excellent marks in his jumping tests. He began his sporting career with rider Bo Kristoferrssen, then was leased by the Zangersheide stud from 1995. This stud entrusted him to their rider Jos Lansink, who competed with the stallion at the Atlanta Olympic Games in 1996, under the name Carthago Z.

Carthago was retired in December 2000, after the CSI-W in Mechelen, and following a request for his return by the Holsteiner Verband. The following year, his lease with Zangersheide came to an end, and Carthago returned to his native Germany for a successful breeding career. He became infertile during the last years of his life. He died on May 21, 2013, at the age of 26.

== Description ==
Carthago is a gray-coated stallion registered in the Holsteiner studbook. He was 1.71 m or 1.70 m tall. He is renowned for his great elegance.

== Achievements ==
Carthago took part in 15 Nations Cups and two Olympic Games.

- 1996: 11th individual at the Atlanta Olympic Games.
- 1998: Winner of the Grand Prix de La Baule.
- 1999: Winner of the Nations' Cup stage at Hickstead.
- 2000: Winner of the Nations' Cup stage in La Baule; second in the Hamburg Grand Prix; 4th in the World Cup stage in Geneva; second in the Aachen Grand Prix.

== Origins ==
Carthago is a son of the Holsteiner stallion Capitol I and the mare Perra, by Calando I.

Pedigree of Carthago (1987-2013)
| Sire Capitol I (1975-1999) | Capitano (1968) | Corporal (1963) | Cottage Son (1944) |
| Sire Capitol I (1975-1999) | Capitano (1968) | Corporal (1963) | Gimara (1948) |
| Sire Capitol I (1975-1999) | Capitano (1968) | Retina (1952) | Ramzès (1937-1963) |
| Sire Capitol I (1975-1999) | Capitano (1968) | Retina (1952) | Dolli (1945) |
| Sire Capitol I (1975-1999) | Folia (1969) | Maximus (1963) | Vase (1961) |
| Sire Capitol I (1975-1999) | Folia (1969) | Maximus (1963) | No info |
| Sire Capitol I (1975-1999) | Folia (1969) | No info | No info |
| Sire Capitol I (1975-1999) | Folia (1969) | No info | No info |
| Dam Perra (1978) | Calandro I (1974) | Cor de la Bryère (1968-2000) | Rantzau (1946-1971) |
| Dam Perra (1978) | Calandro I (1974) | Cor de la Bryère (1968-2000) | Quenotte (1960) |
| Dam Perra (1978) | Calandro I (1974) | Furgund (1969) | No info |
| Dam Perra (1978) | Calandro I (1974) | Furgund (1969) | No info |
| Dam Perra (1978) | Kerrin (1973) | Mambo (1969) | No info |
| Dam Perra (1978) | Kerrin (1973) | Mambo (1969) | No info |
| Dam Perra (1978) | Kerrin (1973) | Fangelika (1969) | Consul (1960) |
| Dam Perra (1978) | Kerrin (1973) | Fangelika (1969) | No info |

== Progeny ==
Carthago is the sire of Mylord Carthago and Electra van't Roosakker. After his death, Zangersheide Stud regretted the absence of cloning authorization for Carthago.

| Carthago (1987-2013) | Cassandra Z (1997) | Calvados Z (2001-2012) |
| Carthago (1987-2013) | Mylord Carthago (2000) | Totem de Brecey (2007) |
| Carthago (1987-2013) | Mylord Carthago (2000) | Twentytwo des Biches (2007) |
| Carthago (1987-2013) | Mylord Carthago (2000) | Bingo du Parc (2011) |
| Carthago (1987-2013) | Mylord Carthago (2000) | Cocaïne du Val (2012) |
| Carthago (1987-2013) | Carthina Z (2000) | Emerald van't Ruytershof (2004) |
