= Bertram Allen (equestrian) =

Irish showjumper

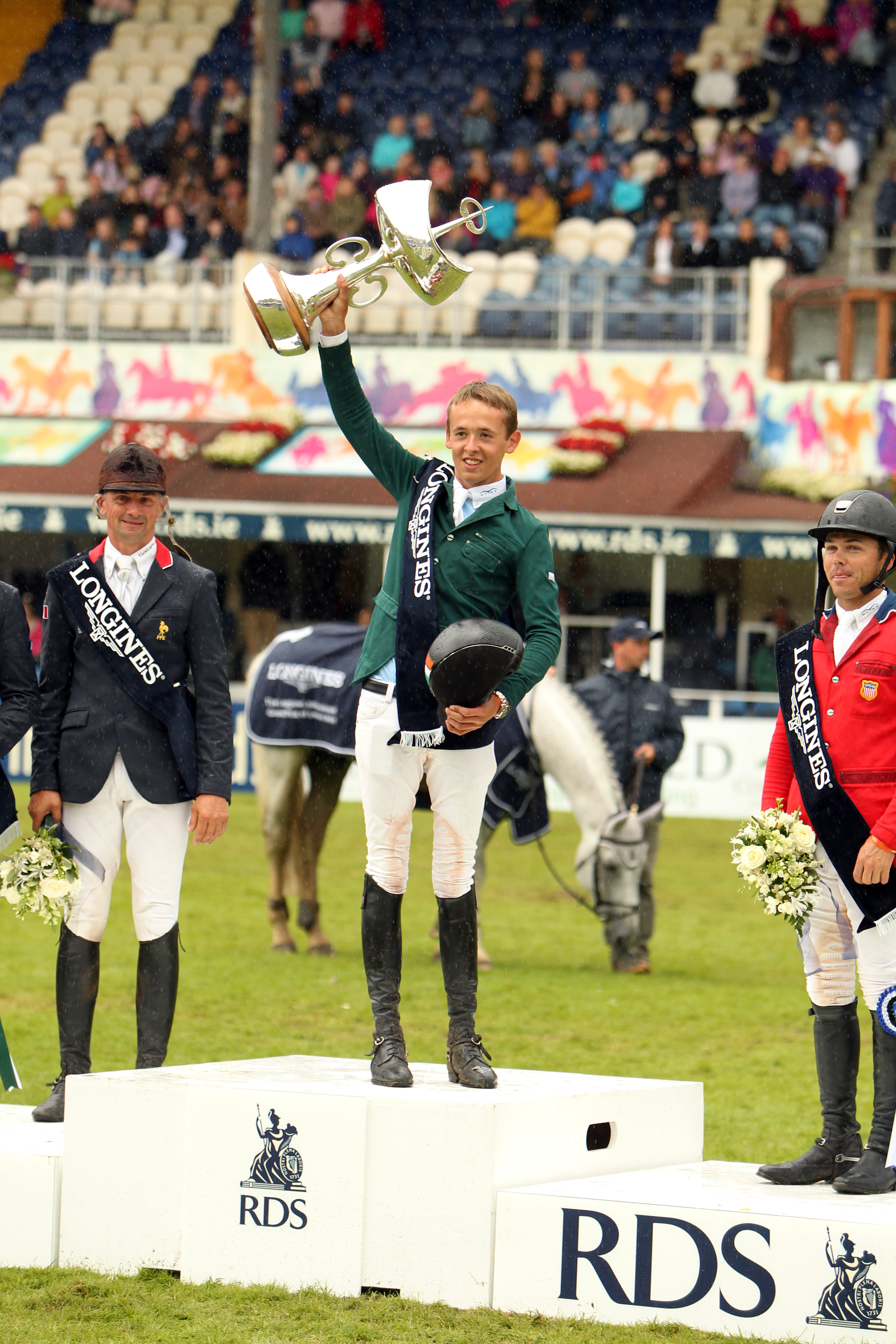
- Allen on the podium after winning the Dublin Grand Prix

Personal information
- Born: August 1, 1995 (age 30)
- Website: http://www.bertram-allen.com/

Sport
- Sport: Show jumping
- Team: Valkenswaard United
Medal record
Equestrian
Representing Ireland
European Championships
Gold medal – first place	2017 Gothenburg	Team jumping

Bertram Allen (born 1 August 1995) is an Irish show jumping rider. Originally from Wexford, he has won international medals at the pony, junior, and senior level. He won the opening round of the 2014 World Equestrian Games in Normandy at age 19, receiving international recognition. Allen is the youngest winner of a Grand Prix on the Longines Global Champions Tour, and was a team gold medalist at the 2017 European Championship in Gothenburg.

He runs his Ballywalter Stables in Hünxe with his sister, April, who manages the operation. Allen has been based in Germany since 2011.

== Early life and career ==
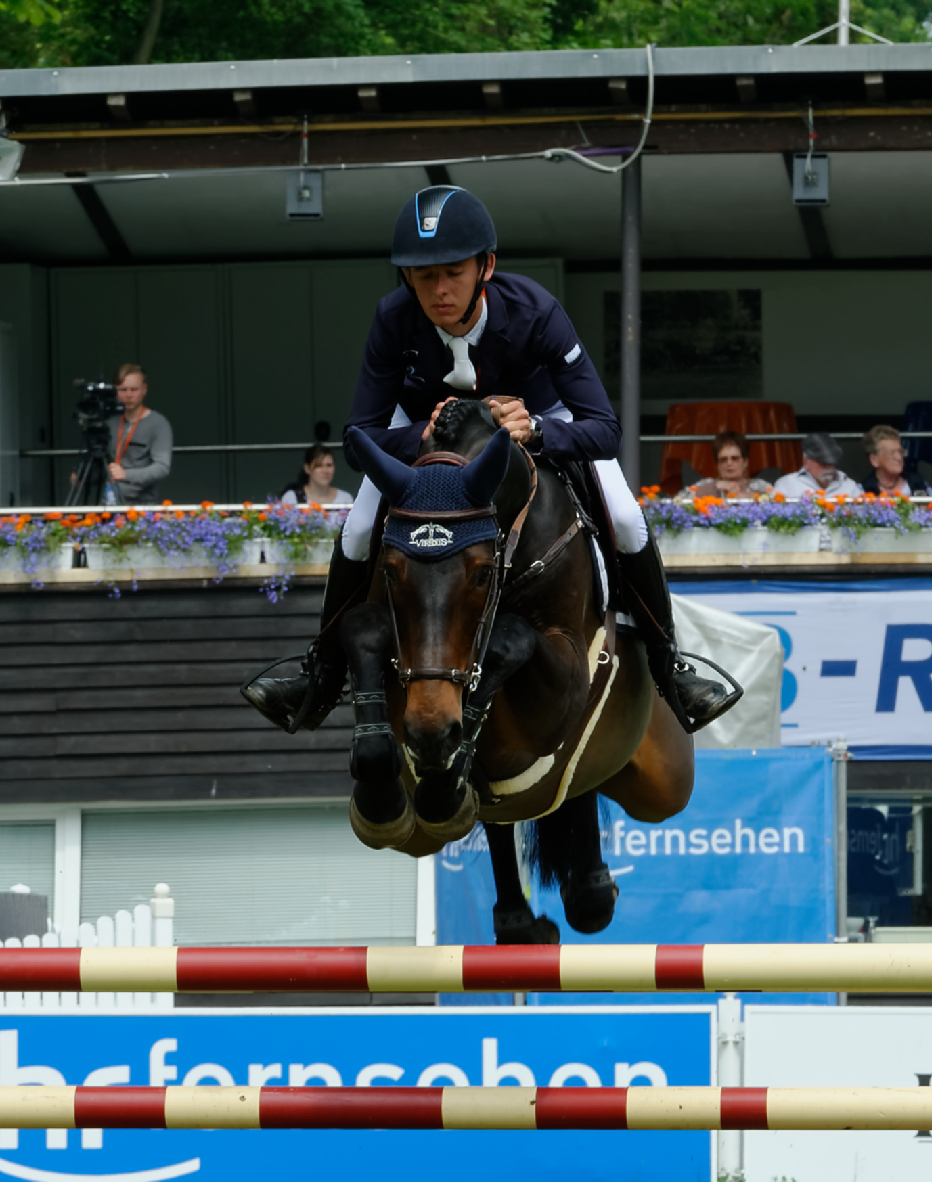
Allen and Izzy by Picobello in 2015

Allen and his six siblings grew up with a strong equestrian influence, since their father owned and developed racehorses. Allen began riding at a local stable, and soon began competing. He then trained with Mag and Con Power; the helped him join Billy Twomey, who has influenced Allen's career.

He had successfully competed on ponies, winning every championship at the Dublin Horse Show and individual gold and team silver medals at the European Championships on Bishop Burton in the pony jumper classes in 2010. Allen competed on horses as a juniors, winning a team gold medal with Wild Thing L in 2012 and an individual silver medal with Molly Malone V in 2013. Twomey found Allen's early horses, Romanov, Molly Malone V and Wild Thing L, on whom he was successful.

At age 15, Allen moved to Hünxe. He rode his first senior competitions at age 17, where he jumped a double clear round in his first Nations Cup. Allen was introduced to Marcus Ehning (whose stable is 20 minutes away from Allen's) around this time, and Ehning became Allen's trainer.

== Professional career ==
Allen was successful early on the senior international level. At age 18 he won the opening speed round of the 2014 World Equestrian Games in Normandy, finishing seventh overall. Allen finished third overall at the World Cup Jumping Finals in Las Vegas; both were on Molly Malone V. He won the 2014 Dublin Grand Prix on Molly Malone V, and was a member of the Irish Nations Cup team at Dublin (on Romanov) which won the Aga Khan Trophy. Allen is also the youngest rider to win a 5* Grand Prix on the Global Champions Tour, in Paris in 2015.

Allen was not chosen for the 2016 Olympic Games in Rio de Janeiro. At the 2015 London International Horse Show, Allen was disqualified due to the "blood rule" when he drew blood from excessive use of spurs.

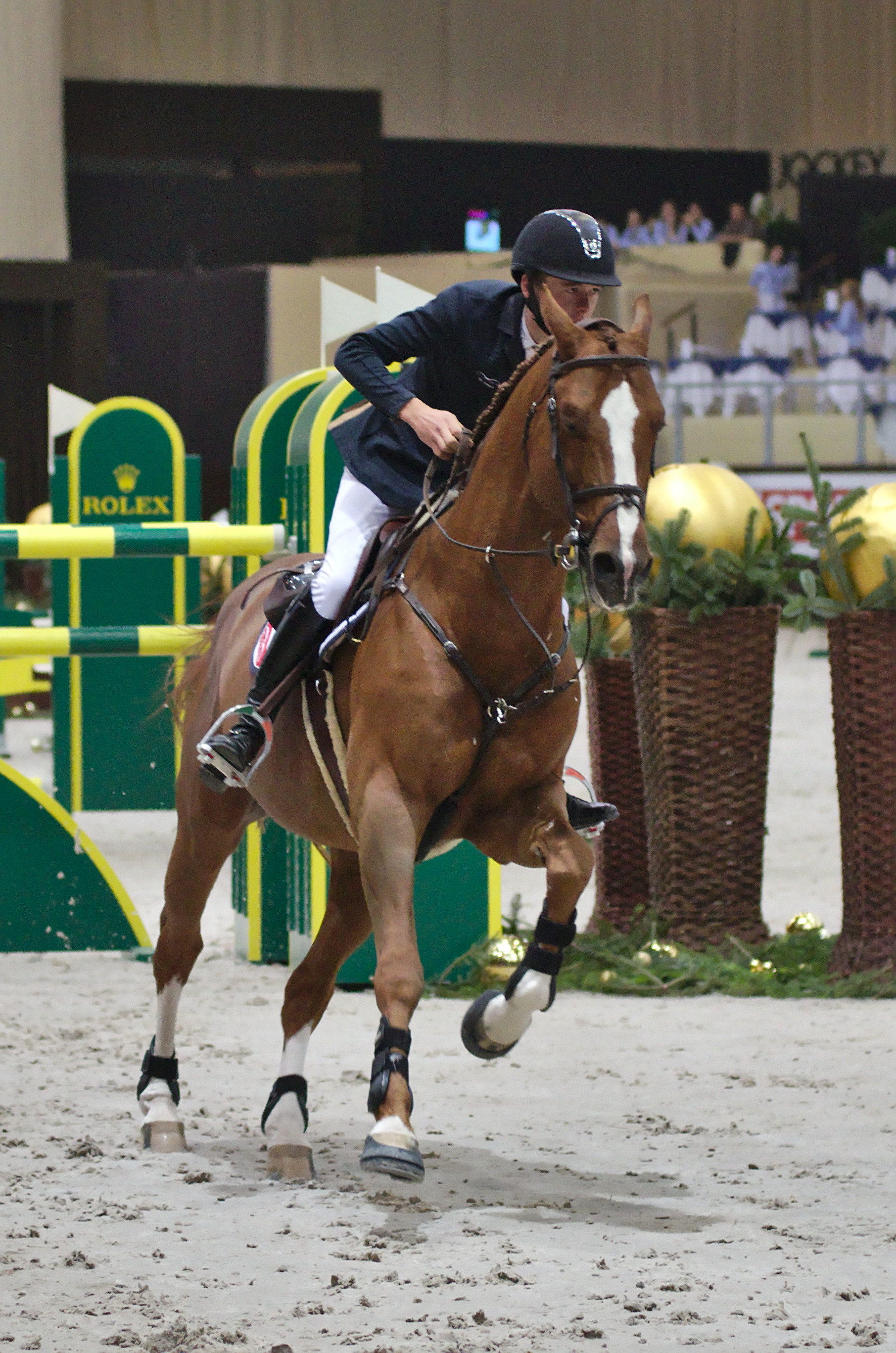
Allen and Romanov in Geneva in 2013

He was on the gold medal-winning Irish team at the 2017 European Championships with Hector van d'Abdijhoeve, despite a fall during the competition. Allen won the 5* Grand Prix in St. Gallen on Hector van d'Abdijhoeve, in addition to 5* wins in Doha, Mexico City, Hamburg, Helsinki, Olympia London Olympia and at the Dutch Masters. In 2018, he rode for the Global Champions League team Valkenswaard United, placing second in the league playoffs. Allen purchased Harley vd Bisschop (a stallion formerly ridden by Nicola Philippaerts) in October of that year, selling Hector van d'Abdijhoeve ro Denis Lynch in January 2019. He and GK Caspar won the World Cup Qualifier at the Royal Agricultural Winter Fair in Toronto, and had several wins in 2020 before the season was halted due to the COVID-19 pandemic.

In 2024, he was selected as Ireland's travelling reserve for the 2024 Paris Olympic Games. A week before the games, Allen had to rescind his place after his mount, Pacino Amiro sustained a minor injury.

== Major results ==
Year	Place	Horse	Event	Rating	Show	Location
2020	1	GK Casper	WEF Challenge Cup	CSI4*	Winter Equestrian Festival	Wellington, Florida
2019	1	GK Casper	Toronto World Cup Qualifier	CSI4*-W	The Royal	Toronto
2019	1	GK Casper	1.55m Speed	CSI5*	LGCT Doha	Doha, Qatar
2018	1	Harley vd Bisschop	GCL Playoffs	CSI5*	LGCT Prague	Prague
2018	1	Gin Chin van het Lindenhof	Longines Trophy Grand Prix	CSI4*	Jumping Indoor Maastricht	Maastricht
2018	2	Molly Malone V	LGCT Grand Prix of Paris	CSI5*	LGCT Paris	Paris
2018	3	Hector van d'Abdijhoeve	Rolex Grand Prix of Rome	CSI5*	Rome Piazza di Siena	Rome
2017	1	Gin Chin van het Lindenhof	Christmas Tree Stakes 1.55m	CSI5*-W	London Olympia	London
2017	1	Gin Chin van het Lindenhof	Sweden Grand Prix	CSI4*	Sweden International Horse Show	Stockholm
2017	Gold	Hector van d'Abdijhoeve	European Championships	CH-EU	European Championships	Gothenburg
2017	1	Izzy by Picobello	Anglesea Serpentine Stakes 1.55m	CSIO5*	Dublin Horse Show	Dublin
2016	1	Molly Malone V	Sweden Grand Prix	CSI4*	Sweden International Horse Show	Stockholm
2015	3	Molly Malone V	FEI World Cup Jumping Finals	WC	World Cup Finals	Las Vegas
2015	1	Romanov	Bordeaux World Cup Qualifier	CSI5*-W	Jumping International of Bordeaux	Bordeaux
2015	1	Romanov	LGCT Grand Prix of Paris	CSI5*	LGCT Paris	Paris
2015	1	Molly Malone V	Grand Prix of Dinard	CSI5*	Dinard	Dinard
2014	7	Molly Malone V	World Equestrian Games - Individual	WEG	World Equestrian Games	Normandy
