= HMCS Stormont =

Several units of the Royal Canadian Navy have been named HMCS Stormont.

- HMCS Stormont (K444), a River-class frigate renamed Matane before commissioning. The ship served in the Battle of the Atlantic during the Second World War.
- HMCS Stormont (K327), a River-class frigate that served in the Battle of the Atlantic during the Second World War.

== Battle honours ==
Ships names Stormont have earned the following battle honours;

- Atlantic, 1944–45
- Arctic, 1944
- English Channel, 1944
- Normandy, 1944
