= German submarine U-2516 =

German World War II submarine

History

Nazi Germany
- Name: U-2516
- Ordered: 6 November 1943
- Builder: Blohm & Voss, Hamburg, Germany
- Yard number: 2516
- Laid down: 3 August 1944
- Launched: 27 September 1944
- Commissioned: 24 October 1944
- Fate: Sunk on 9 April 1945

General characteristics
- Class & type: Type XXI submarine
- Displacement: 1,621 t (1,595 long tons) surfaced; 1,819 t (1,790 long tons) submerged
- Length: 76.70 m (251 ft 8 in) (o/a); 60.50 m (198 ft 6 in) (p/h)
- Beam: 8 m (26 ft 3 in) (o/a); 5.3 m (17 ft 5 in) (p/h)
- Height: 11.30 m (37 ft 1 in)
- Draught: 6.32 m (20 ft 9 in)
- Installed power: 4,000 PS (2,900 kW; 3,900 shp) (diesel drive); 5,000 PS (3,700 kW; 4,900 shp) (standard electric drive); 226 PS (166 kW; 223 shp) (silent electric drive)
- Propulsion: Diesel/Electric 2 x 62 batteries (226 hp); 2 × MAN M6V40/46KBB supercharged 6-cylinder diesel engines; 2 × SSW GU365/30 double-acting electric motors; 2 × SSW GV232/28 silent running electric motors
- Speed: Surfaced: 15.6 knots (28.9 km/h; 18.0 mph) (diesel); 17.9 knots (33.2 km/h; 20.6 mph) (electric); Submerged: 17.2 knots (31.9 km/h; 19.8 mph) (electric); 6.1 knots (11.3 km/h; 7.0 mph) (silent running motors)
- Range: 15,500 nmi (28,700 km; 17,800 mi) at 10 knots (19 km/h; 12 mph) surfaced; 340 nmi (630 km; 390 mi) at 5 knots (9.3 km/h; 5.8 mph) submerged
- Test depth: 280 m (920 ft)
- Complement: 57–60 crewmen
- Sensors & processing systems: Type F432 D2 Radar Transmitter; FuMB Ant 3 Bali Radar Detector
- Armament: 6 × bow torpedo tubes; 23 × 53.3 cm (21 in) torpedoes or; 17 × torpedoes and 12 × TMC mines; 4 × 2 cm (0.8 in) AA guns or; 4 × 3.7 cm (1.5 in) AA guns

Service record
- Part of: 31st U-boat Flotilla; 24 October 1944 – 9 April 1945
- Identification codes: M 47 956
- Commanders: Oblt.z.S.d.R Fritz Kallipke; 24 October 1944 – 9 April 1945
- Operations: None
- Victories: None

German submarine U-2516 was a Type XXI U-boat (Elektroboot) of Nazi Germany's Kriegsmarine during the Second World War. She spent the war as a trials vessel and was damaged beyond repair by a British air raid while docked and scrapped in Kiel, Germany.

== Construction ==
The U-2516 was laid down on 3 August 1944 at the Blohm & Voss shipyard in Hamburg, Germany. She was launched on 27 September 1944 and commissioned on 24 October 1944 under the command of Oberleutnant zur See der Reserve Fritz Kallipke with her U-boat emblem being a red deer.

When she was completed, the submarine was 76.70 metres (251 ft 8 in) long overall (o/a), with a beam of 8 metres (26 ft 3 in) and a draught of 6.32 metres (20 ft 9 in). She was assessed at 1,819 t (1,790 long tons) submerged and 1,621 t (1,595 long tons) when at the surface. The submarine was powered by two MAN SE supercharged six-cylinder M6V40/46KBB diesel engines each producing a total of 4,000 metric horsepower (2,940 kW; 3,950 shp) for use while surfaced and two Siemens-Schuckert GU365/30 double-acting electric motors each providing a total of 5,000 metric horsepower (3,700 kW; 4,900 shp) and two Siemens-Schuckert silent running GV232/28 electric motors each providing 226 metric horsepower (166 kW; 223 shp) for use while submerged. The submarine had a maximum surface speed of 15.6 knots (28.9 km/h; 18.0 mph) and a maximum submerged speed of 17.2 knots (31.9 km/h; 19.8 mph) with a speed of 6.1 knots (11.3 km/h; 7.0 mph) when running on silent motors. When submerged, the U-boat could operate for 340 nautical miles (630 km; 390 mi) at 5 knots (9.3 km/h; 5.8 mph) and when surfaced, she could travel 15.5000 nautical miles (28.7060 km; 17.8371 mi) at 10 knots (19 km/h; 12 mph).

The submarine was fitted with six 53.3 cm (21 in) torpedo tubes (All fitted at the bow) and 23 torpedoes or 17 torpedoes and 12 mines. The boat was also equipped with four 2 cm (0.79 in) C/30 anti-aircraft guns. The submarine had a complement of five officers and 52 men.

== Service history ==
U-2516 did not undertake any combat patrols and was instead assigned as a trials boat to the 31st U-boat Flotilla from 24 October 1944 onward always serving under the same commander until her career's end.

The U-2516 was docked at drydock number 1 in Kiel, Germany, on 9 April 1945 when the docks were attacked at 22:30 by British RAF bombers from Bomber Command's 1st, 3rd and 8th Groups. There were three men aboard U-2516 at the time of the attack working in the engine room. Two of them were killed when several bombs hit U-2516, which had also damaged her beyond repair ending her war career. Also destroyed by the bombing of Kiel that night was the U-1227. The wreck of U-2516 lay where she was sunk until she was scrapped after the war's end.

== Bibliography ==
- Busch, Rainer; Röll, Hans-Joachim (1999). German U-boat commanders of World War II : a biographical dictionary. Translated by Brooks, Geoffrey. London, Annapolis, Md: Greenhill Books, Naval Institute Press. ISBN 1-55750-186-6.
- Busch, Rainer; Röll, Hans-Joachim (1999). Der U-Boot-Krieg, 1939-1945: Deutsche U-Boot-Verluste von September 1939 bis Mai 1945 [German U-boat losses from September 1939 to May 1945] (in German). Vol. IV. Hamburg, Berlin, Bonn: Mittler. ISBN 3-8132-0514-2.
- Gröner, Erich; Jung, Dieter; Maass, Martin (1991). U-boats and Mine Warfare Vessels. German Warships 1815–1945. Vol. 2. Translated by Thomas, Keith; Magowan, Rachel. London: Conway Maritime Press. ISBN 0-85177-593-4.
