= 2nd U-boat Flotilla =

- Active: Raised 1936, Dissolved 1944
- Country: Nazi Germany
- Branch: Kriegsmarine
- Type: U-boat flotilla
- Garrison/HQ: Kiel, Wilhelmshaven, Lorient
- Nickname(s): Saltzwedel Flotilla
- Engagements: World War II; Battle of the Atlantic (1939–1945); Battle of the Caribbean

Commanders
- Notable commanders: Korvettenkapitän Werner Hartmann; Korvettenkapitän Viktor Schütze; Fregattenkapitän Ernst Kals

The 2nd U-boat Flotilla (German 2. Unterseebootsflottille), also known as the Saltzwedel Flotilla, was the second operational U-boat unit in Nazi Germany's Kriegsmarine. Founded on 1 September 1936 under the command of Fregattenkapitän Werner Scheer, it was named in honour of Oberleutnant zur See Reinhold Saltzwedel. Saltzwedel, a U-boat commander during World War I, died on 2 December 1917, when his submarine UB-81 was sunk by a mine in the English Channel.

The flotilla was based in Kiel for the first few weeks after its formation, but was later moved to Wilhelmshaven, where it remained until May 1940. In June 1940, the flotilla was moved to Lorient in France until it was disbanded in August 1944.

== Flotilla Commanders ==
Duration	Rank	Commander
September 1936 - July 1937	Fregattenkapitän	Werner Scheer
October 1937 - September 1939	Korvettenkapitän	Hans Ibbeken
January 1940 - May 1940	Korvettenkapitän	Werner Hartmann
May 1940 - July 1941	Korvettenkapitän	Heinz Fischer
August 1941 - January 1943	Korvettenkapitän	Viktor Schütze
January 1943 - October 1944	Kapitän zur See	Ernst Kals

== U-boats assigned to the flotilla ==
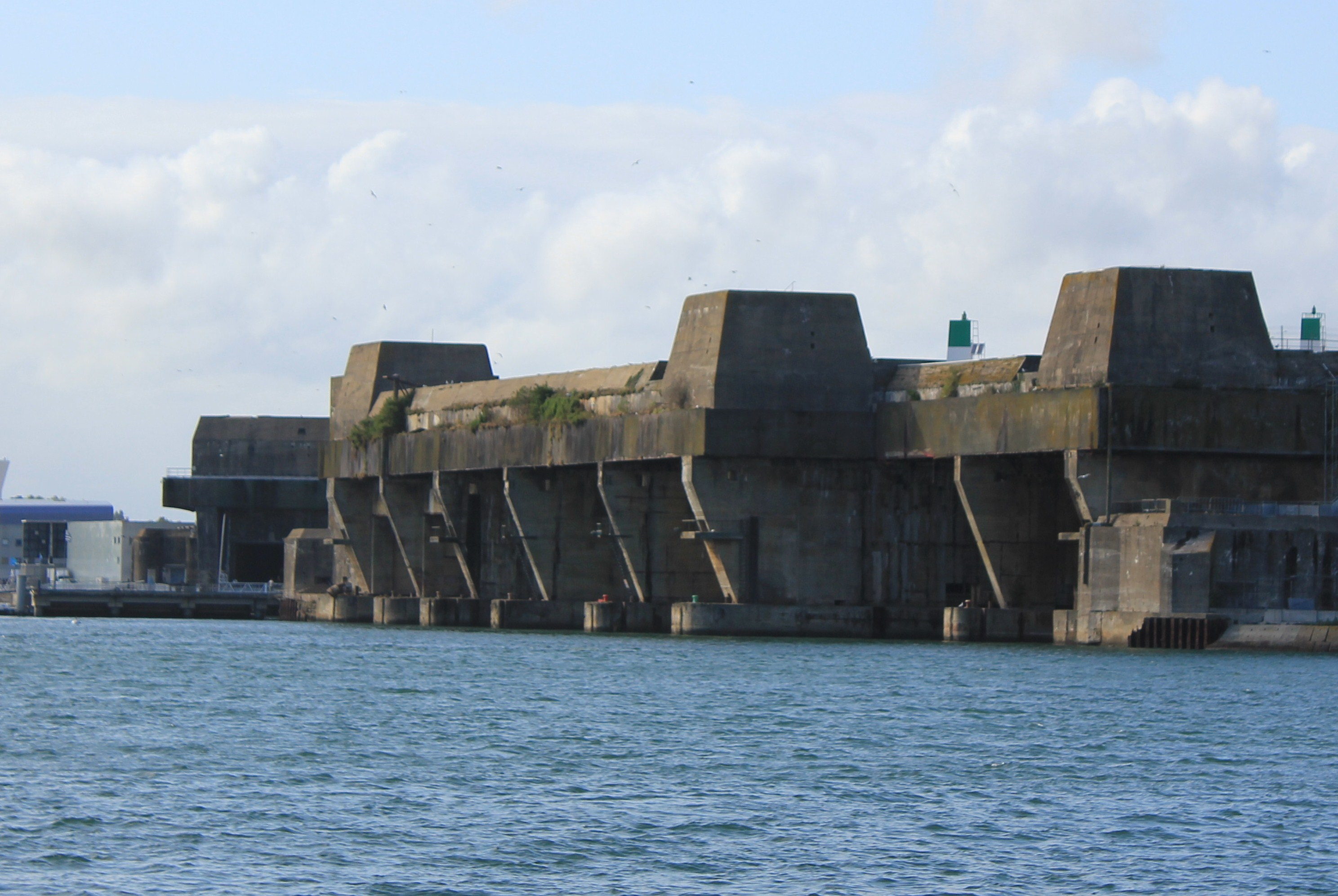
U-boat pen Keroman I at Lorient.

U-25	U-26	U-27	U-28	U-29	U-30	U-31
U-32	U-33	U-34	U-35	U-36	U-37	U-38
U-41	U-43	U-44	U-64	U-65	U-66	U-67
U-68	U-103	U-104	U-105	U-106	U-107	U-108
U-109	U-110	U-111	U-116	U-117	U-122	U-123
U-124	U-125	U-126	U-127	U-128	U-129	U-130
U-131	U-153	U-154	U-156	U-157	U-161	U-162
U-168	U-173	U-183	U-184	U-189	U-190	U-191
U-193	U-501	U-502	U-503	U-504	U-505	U-507
U-518	U-519	U-520	U-521	U-522	U-531	U-532
U-534	U-536	U-538	U-545	U-547	U-548	U-801
U-802	U-841	U-842	U-843	U-856	U-858	U-868
U-1223	U-1225	U-1226	U-1227	U-1228		
