= German submarine U-189 =

German World War II submarine

History

Nazi Germany
- Name: U-189
- Ordered: 4 November 1940
- Builder: DeSchiMAG AG Weser, Bremen
- Yard number: 1035
- Laid down: 12 September 1941
- Launched: 1 May 1942
- Commissioned: 15 August 1942
- Fate: Sunk by a British aircraft, 23 April 1943

General characteristics
- Class & type: Type IXC/40 submarine
- Displacement: 1,144 t (1,126 long tons) surfaced; 1,257 t (1,237 long tons) submerged
- Length: 76.76 m (251 ft 10 in) o/a; 58.75 m (192 ft 9 in) pressure hull
- Beam: 6.86 m (22 ft 6 in) o/a; 4.44 m (14 ft 7 in) pressure hull
- Height: 9.60 m (31 ft 6 in)
- Draught: 4.67 m (15 ft 4 in)
- Installed power: 4,400 PS (3,200 kW; 4,300 bhp) (diesels); 1,000 PS (740 kW; 990 shp) (electric)
- Propulsion: 2 shafts; 2 × diesel engines; 2 × electric motors
- Speed: 18.3 knots (33.9 km/h; 21.1 mph) surfaced; 7.3 knots (13.5 km/h; 8.4 mph) submerged
- Range: 13,850 nmi (25,650 km; 15,940 mi) at 10 knots (19 km/h; 12 mph) surfaced; 63 nmi (117 km; 72 mi) at 4 knots (7.4 km/h; 4.6 mph) submerged
- Test depth: 230 m (750 ft)
- Complement: 4 officers, 44 enlisted
- Armament: 6 × torpedo tubes (4 bow, 2 stern); 22 × 53.3 cm (21 in) torpedoes; 1 × 10.5 cm (4.1 in) SK C/32 deck gun (180 rounds); 1 × 3.7 cm (1.5 in) SK C/30 AA gun; 1 × twin 2 cm FlaK 30 AA guns

Service record
- Part of: 4th U-boat Flotilla; 15 August 1942 – 1 April 1943; 2nd U-boat Flotilla; 1 – 23 April 1943
- Identification codes: M 49 106
- Commanders: K.Kapt. Hellmut Kurrer; 15 August 1942 – 23 April 1943
- Operations: 1 patrol: 3 – 23 April 1943
- Victories: None

German submarine U-189 was a Type IXC/40 U-boat of Nazi Germany's Kriegsmarine built for service during World War II. Her keel was laid down on 12 September 1941 by DeSchiMAG AG Weser in Bremen as yard number 1035. She was launched on 1 May 1942 and commissioned on 15 August with Korvettenkapitän Hellmut Kurrer in command.

The U-boat's service began with training as part of the 4th U-boat Flotilla. She then moved to the 2nd flotilla on 1 April 1943 for operations.

She was sunk by a British aircraft on 23 April 1943.

== Design ==
German Type IXC/40 submarines were slightly larger than the original Type IXCs. U-189 had a displacement of 1,144 tonnes (1,126 long tons) when at the surface and 1,257 tonnes (1,237 long tons) while submerged. The U-boat had a total length of 76.76 m (251 ft 10 in), a pressure hull length of 58.75 m (192 ft 9 in), a beam of 6.86 m (22 ft 6 in), a height of 9.60 m (31 ft 6 in), and a draught of 4.67 m (15 ft 4 in). The submarine was powered by two MAN M 9 V 40/46 supercharged four-stroke, nine-cylinder diesel engines producing a total of 4,400 metric horsepower (3,240 kW; 4,340 shp) for use while surfaced, two Siemens-Schuckert 2 GU 345/34 double-acting electric motors producing a total of 1,000 shaft horsepower (1,010 PS; 750 kW) for use while submerged. She had two shafts and two 1.92 m (6 ft) propellers. The boat was capable of operating at depths of up to 230 metres (750 ft).

The submarine had a maximum surface speed of 18.3 knots (33.9 km/h; 21.1 mph) and a maximum submerged speed of 7.3 knots (13.5 km/h; 8.4 mph). When submerged, the boat could operate for 63 nautical miles (117 km; 72 mi) at 4 knots (7.4 km/h; 4.6 mph); when surfaced, she could travel 13,850 nautical miles (25,650 km; 15,940 mi) at 10 knots (19 km/h; 12 mph). U-189 was fitted with six 53.3 cm (21 in) torpedo tubes (four fitted at the bow and two at the stern), 22 torpedoes, one 10.5 cm (4.13 in) SK C/32 naval gun, 180 rounds, and a 3.7 cm (1.5 in) SK C/30 as well as a 2 cm (0.79 in) C/30 anti-aircraft gun. The boat had a complement of forty-eight.

== Service history ==
=== Patrol and loss ===
U-189's patrol took her from Kiel on 3 April 1943, across the North Sea and into the Atlantic Ocean through the 'gap' between Greenland and Iceland.

She was sunk east of Cape Farewell (Greenland) by depth charges dropped by a British Liberator on 23 April 1943. Fifty-four men were killed; leaving no survivors.

The pilot of the Liberator reported the sinking and about 50 men in the water, but received the answer that no ships would be made available for rescue. All were left to perish in the ice cold sea and 54 in total died.

=== Wolfpacks ===
U-189 took part in one wolfpack, namely:

- Meise (21 – 23 April 1943)

== Bibliography ==
- Busch, Rainer; Röll, Hans-Joachim (1999). German U-boat commanders of World War II : a biographical dictionary. Translated by Brooks, Geoffrey. London, Annapolis, Md: Greenhill Books, Naval Institute Press. ISBN 1-55750-186-6.
- Busch, Rainer; Röll, Hans-Joachim (1999). Deutsche U-Boot-Verluste von September 1939 bis Mai 1945 [German U-boat losses from September 1939 to May 1945]. Der U-Boot-Krieg (in German). Vol. IV. Hamburg, Berlin, Bonn: Mittler. ISBN 3-8132-0514-2.
- Gröner, Erich; Jung, Dieter; Maass, Martin (1991). U-boats and Mine Warfare Vessels. German Warships 1815–1945. Vol. 2. Translated by Thomas, Keith; Magowan, Rachel. London: Conway Maritime Press. ISBN 0-85177-593-4.
