= Christina O =

Luxury yacht built in 1943

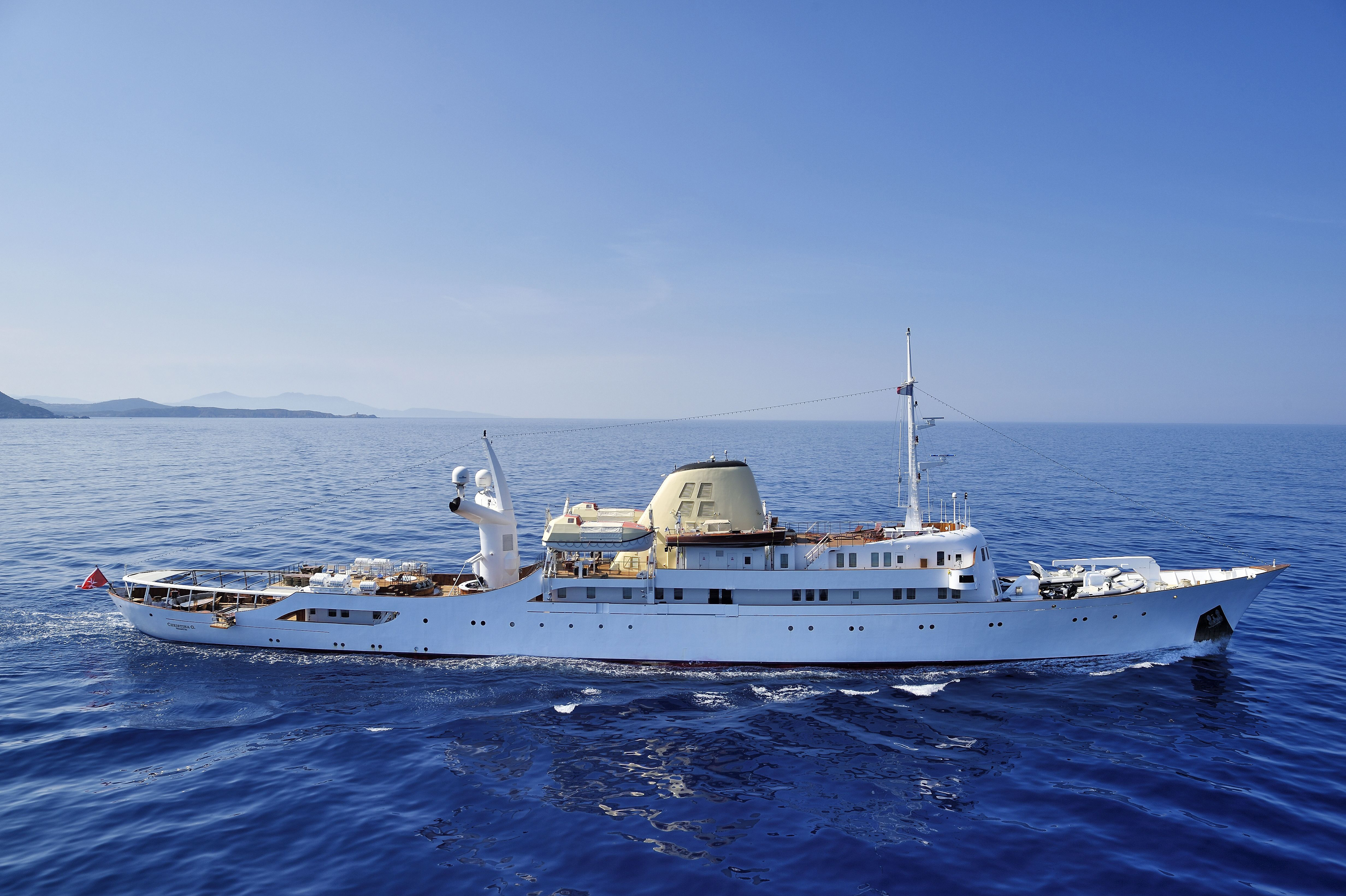
- Christina O in 2018

History
- Name: 1998–present Christina O; 1978–1998 Argo; 1954–1978 Christina; 1943–1954 HMCS Stormont (K327)
- Builder: Canadian Vickers Ltd., Montreal
- Laid down: 23 December 1942
- Launched: 14 July 1943
- Maiden voyage: 1943
- In service: 1943
- Identification: IMO number: 8963818; MMSI number: 248383000; Callsign: 9HA2344

General characteristics
- Displacement: 2250 tonnes
- Length: 325 ft (99.06 m)
- Beam: 36 ft (10.97 m)
- Draft: 14 ft (4.27 m)
- Installed power: 2× 2,069 kW (2,775 bhp) main engines; 3× 476 kW generators; 1× 176 kW emergency generator
- Speed: 19 knots (35 km/h; 22 mph)
- Capacity: 34
- Crew: 39

Christina O is a private motor yacht that once belonged to billionaire Greek shipowner Aristotle Onassis. At 99.13 metres long, she was the 59th largest yacht in the world as of 2022.

== History ==
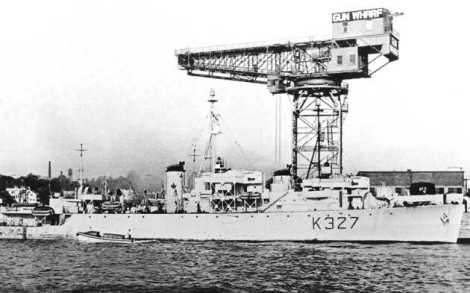
Christina O in her previous role as HMCS Stormont

The ship originally served as a Canadian anti-submarine River-class frigate HMCS Stormont, launched in 1943. Stormont served as a convoy escort during the Battle of the Atlantic and was present at the Normandy landings. Onassis purchased Stormont after the end of World War II as naval surplus, at a scrap value of US$34,000. He spent US$4 million to convert the vessel into a luxury yacht, the first postwar superyacht. He named her after his daughter Christina.

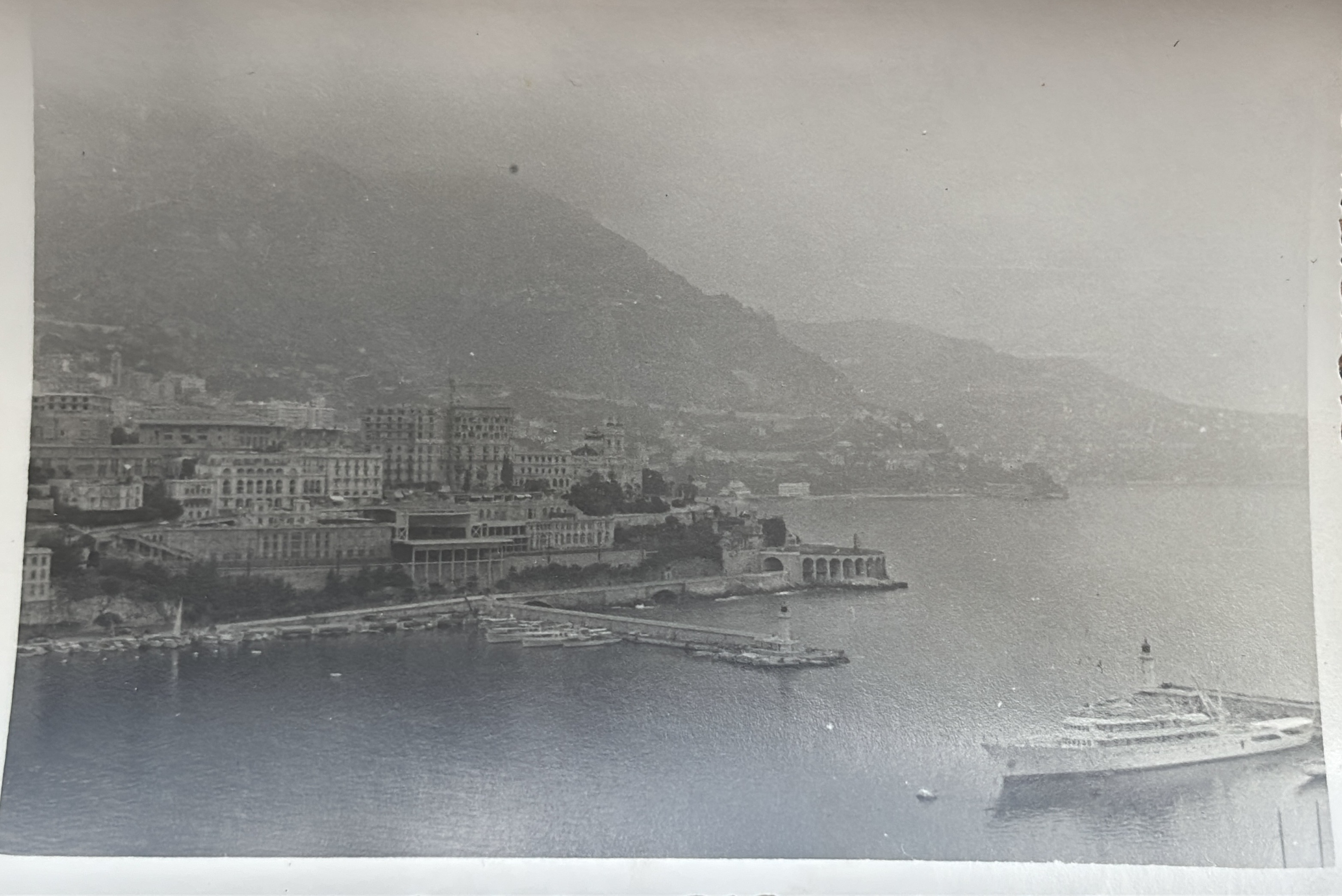
Christina O (bottom right) docked in Monaco

Christina O set a new standard for lavish personal yachts, especially amidst the austerity of post-war Europe. The yacht was remodelled by architect Cäsar Pinnau, who made full use of the ship's size and powerful naval engineering systems to create large, ornate interiors and elaborate luxuries. These included swimming pool with a mosaic bottom that rose to become a dance floor, a children's dining room designed and painted by the illustrator Ludwig Bemelmans, as well as ostentatious displays of wealth reflected in bar stools upholstered in whale foreskins and whales' teeth carved into pornographic scenes from the Odyssey.

A competitive rivalry with Stavros Niarchos likely drove some decisions around the purchase and outfitting of the ship by Onassis.

After her 1968 marriage to Onassis, Jacqueline Onassis selected a pastel color scheme and decor in all of the cabins.

== Notable guests ==
Apart from his mistress Maria Callas and his wife Jackie Kennedy Onassis, Aristotle Onassis entertained celebrities such as Umberto Agnelli, Giovanni Battista Meneghini (Callas' husband until 1959 when she left him for Onassis), Richard Burton, Clementine Churchill, Diana Churchill, Winston Churchill, Jacqueline de Ribes, John F. Kennedy, Greta Garbo, Rainier III, Prince of Monaco, Grace Kelly, Anthony Montague Browne, Rudolf Nureyev, Begum Om Habibeh Aga Khan, J. Paul Getty, Eva Perón, Françoise Sagan, Frank Sinatra, Elizabeth Taylor, Harry Saltzman, John Wayne and Kim Blanke.

In 1956 Rainier III and Grace Kelly held their post-wedding reception on Christina O.

== Ownership ==
Onassis willed the yacht to his daughter Christina, with second wife Jacqueline Kennedy Onassis next in line. If neither was interested, the vessel would be turned over to the Greek government, on condition that it would be properly maintained and serve as presidential yacht. Upon Onassis' death in 1975, both women declined the inheritance.

The Greek government changed the vessel's name to Argo, but allowed it to decay. It was put up for sale at US$16 million in the early 1990s. Unsold, an attempted 1996 purchase by American Alexander Blastos fell through when his deposit check bounced, later resulting in a wire fraud conviction.

The vessel was purchased in a 1998 government-sponsored auction by Greek shipping magnate John Paul Papanicolaou, an Onassis family friend. He reverted her name to Christina O, in tribute to her namesake, who had died in 1988. A major refurbishment was carried out between January 1999 and April 2001. Naval architect Costas Carabelas was hired to spearhead the $50 million refit, engaging interior architect Apostolos Molindris, Decon as construction manager, and the Viktor Lenac Shipyard in Croatia to carry out the work.

The Christina O Limited Partnership bought the yacht for €65 million in 2000.

== Amenities ==
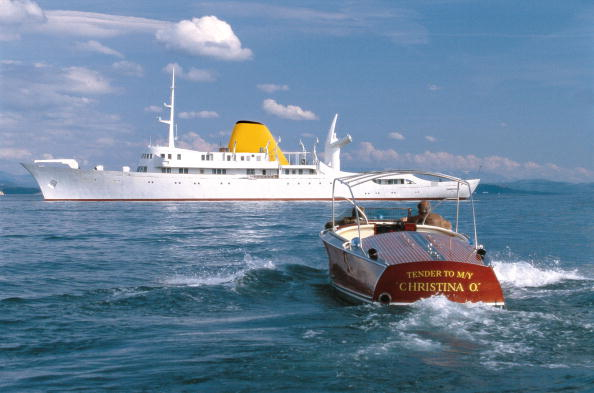
Hacker-craft tender and Christina O

Christina O has a master suite, eighteen passenger staterooms, and numerous indoor and outdoor living areas, all connected by a spiral staircase. Compared to a typical 21st century superyacht, her staterooms are small and Christina O lacks the indoor boat storage that is now standard; however, the number of living areas is large, and the amount of outdoor deck space is generous. The aft main deck has an outdoor pool with a minotaur-themed mosaic floor that rises at the push of a button to become a dance floor. Bar appointments once included whales' teeth carved into pornographic scenes from Homer's Odyssey. The bar stools in Ari's Bar retain the original upholstery crafted from soft, fine leather made from the foreskins of whales.

Whilst owned by Onassis, Christina O was also notable for employing a seaplane for use as a supplementary tender. Over the years three different Piaggio P.136s have been used (G-AOFN, G-APNY later re-registered SX-BDB, and SX-BDC).

== In popular culture ==
Christina O was prominently featured in the 2022 film Triangle of Sadness as the filming location for the second act.

The yacht was rented as a filming location for the 2024 film Maria, a dramatization of the life of Maria Callas starring Angelina Jolie.

== See also ==
- List of motor yachts by length
