= HMCS Magog =

River-class frigate

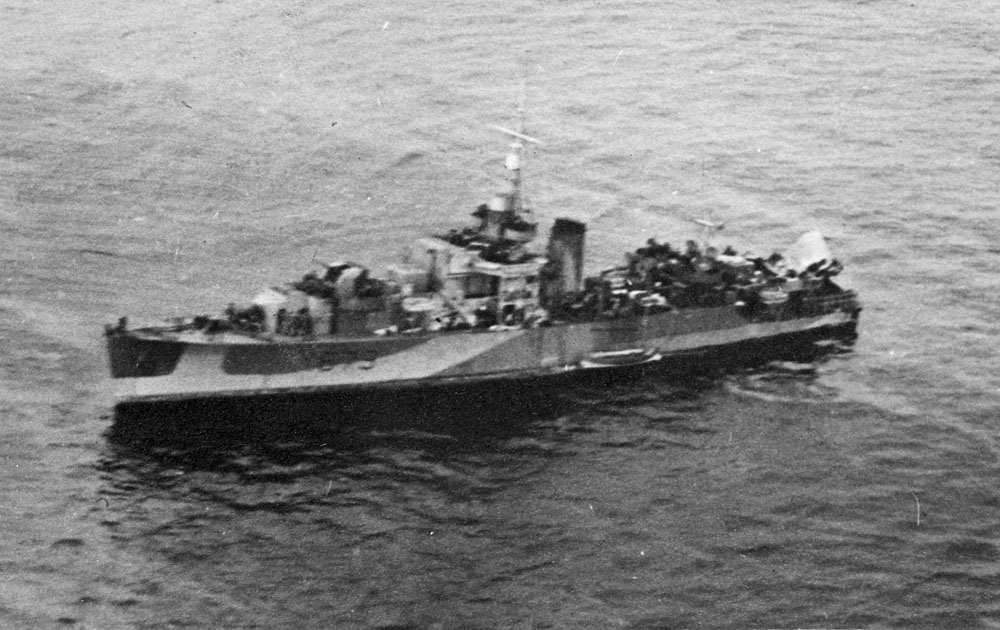
- Magog after being torpedoed, October 1944

History

Canada
- Name: Magog
- Namesake: Magog, Quebec
- Operator: Royal Canadian Navy
- Ordered: October 1941
- Builder: Canadian Vickers, Montreal
- Yard number: 171
- Laid down: 16 June 1943
- Launched: 22 September 1943
- Commissioned: 7 May 1944
- Decommissioned: 20 December 1944
- Identification: Pennant number: K 673
- Honours and awards: Gulf of St. Lawrence, 1944
- Fate: Torpedoed on 14 October 1944. Towed to Quebec City and declared a total loss.

General characteristics
- Class & type: River-class frigate
- Displacement: 1,445 long tons (1,468 t; 1,618 short tons); 2,110 long tons (2,140 t; 2,360 short tons) (deep load)
- Length: 283 ft (86.26 m) p/p; 301.25 ft (91.82 m)o/a
- Beam: 36.5 ft (11.13 m)
- Draught: 9 ft (2.74 m); 13 ft (3.96 m) (deep load)
- Propulsion: 2 × Admiralty 3-drum boilers, 2 shafts, reciprocating vertical triple expansion, 5,500 ihp (4,100 kW)
- Speed: 20 knots (37.0 km/h); 20.5 knots (38.0 km/h) (turbine ships)
- Range: 646 long tons (656 t; 724 short tons) oil fuel; 7,500 nautical miles (13,890 km) at 15 knots (27.8 km/h)
- Complement: 157
- Armament: 2 × QF 4 in (102 mm) /45 Mk. XVI on twin mount HA/LA Mk.XIX; 8 × 20 mm QF Oerlikon A/A on twin mounts Mk.V; 1 × Hedgehog 24 spigot A/S projector; up to 150 depth charges

HMCS Magog was a River-class frigate that served in the Royal Canadian Navy (RCN) during the Second World War. She was used primarily as a convoy escort. On 14 October 1944, she was torpedoed by U-1223. She survived the attack, was towed to port and declared a constructive total loss. Magog was named for the town of Magog, Quebec.

Magog was ordered in October 1941 as part of the 1942-1942 River-class building program. She was laid down on 16 June 1943 by Canadian Vickers Ltd. at Montreal and launched on 22 September 1943. Magog was commissioned into the RCN at Quebec City on 7 May 1944 with the pennant number K673.

== Background ==
The River-class frigate was designed by William Reed of Smith's Dock Company of South Bank-on-Tees. Originally called a "twin-screw corvette", its purpose was to improve on the convoy escort classes in service with the Royal Navy at the time, including the Flower-class corvette. The first orders were placed by the Royal Navy in 1940 and the vessels were named for rivers in the United Kingdom, giving name to the class. In Canada they were named for towns and cities though they kept the same designation. The name "frigate" was suggested by Vice-Admiral Percy Nelles of the Royal Canadian Navy and was adopted later that year.

Improvements over the corvette design included improved accommodation which was markedly better. The twin engines gave only three more knots of speed but extended the range of the ship to nearly double that of a corvette at 7,200 nautical miles (13,300 km) at 12 knots. Among other lessons applied to the design was an armament package better designed to combat U-boats including a twin 4-inch mount forward and 12-pounder aft. 15 Canadian frigates were initially fitted with a single 4-inch gun forward but with the exception of HMCS Valleyfield, they were all eventually upgraded to the double mount. For underwater targets, the River-class frigate was equipped with a Hedgehog anti-submarine mortar and depth charge rails aft and four side-mounted throwers.

River-class frigates were the first Royal Canadian Navy warships to carry the 147B Sword horizontal fan echo sonar transmitter in addition to the irregular ASDIC. This allowed the ship to maintain contact with targets even while firing unless a target was struck. Improved radar and direction-finding equipment improved the RCN's ability to find and track enemy submarines over the previous classes.

Canada originally ordered the construction of 33 frigates in October 1941. The design was too big for the locks on the Lachine Canal so it was not built by the shipyards on the Great Lakes and therefore all the frigates built in Canada were built in dockyards along the West Coast or along the St. Lawrence River below Montreal. In all Canada ordered the construction of 60 frigates including ten for the Royal Navy that transferred two to the United States Navy.

== War service ==
After arriving at Halifax, Magog worked up in St. Margaret's Bay and Bermuda before returning to Montreal for repairs, completing those at Halifax in August 1944. She was assigned to escort group EG 16, which was used to patrol and escort convoys along the eastern Canadian coast. She escorted Convoy ON 256 (Liverpool–New York City), joining the convoy from 8–9 October off eastern Canada. Several days later she escorted Convoy ONS 33 (Liverpool–Halifax), joining the convoy from 13–14 October in the same waters south of Newfoundland.

On 14 October 1944 Magog joined Convoy ONS 33G in the Gulf of St. Lawrence. At 1925 local time, Magog was torpedoed and damaged by German submarine U-1223 near Pointe-des-Monts (near Baie-Trinité, Quebec), losing 65 feet (20 m) of her stern, killing 3 crew and injuring 3 others. After the torpedoing, Magog was taken in tow first by HMCS Toronto, then HMCS Shawinigan to the safety of a bay, and later to Quebec City by the salvage tug Lord Strathcona, where she was eventually declared a total constructive loss. The crew was ordered not to discuss the action at the time by the Prime Minister, William Lyon Mackenzie King.

Magog was paid off 20 December 1944 to care and maintenance and was sold in 1945 to Marine Industries Ltd. from Sorel, Quebec. She was scrapped in 1947.

Her only commanding officer was Lieutenant Lewis Dennis Quick, RCNR (20 March 1944 – 20 December 1944).

== See also ==
- Fleet of the Royal Canadian Navy
