= River-class frigate =

1941 class of frigates of the Royal Navy

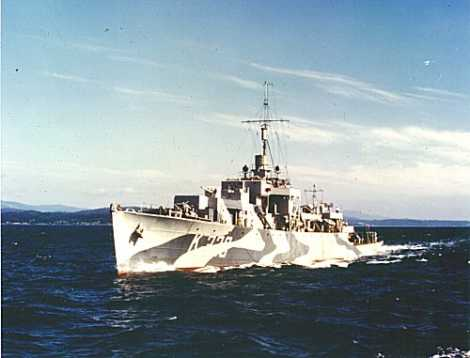
- HMCS Waskesiu

Class overview
- Operators: World War II: Royal Navy; Royal Australian Navy; Royal Canadian Navy; Free French Naval Forces; Royal Netherlands Navy; South African Navy; United States Navy; Post–World War II; Argentine Navy; Royal Ceylon Navy; (later, the Sri Lanka Navy); Chilean Navy; Royal Danish Navy; Dominican Navy; Egyptian Navy; Indian Navy; Israeli Navy; Royal Malaysian Navy; Royal Moroccan Navy; Myanmar Navy; Royal New Zealand Navy; Royal Norwegian Navy; Pakistan Navy; Peruvian Navy; Portuguese Navy
- Succeeded by: Loch class
- Subclasses: RN group I, RN group II, RAN group I, RAN group II, RCN group
- In commission: 1942
- Planned: 30
- Completed: 151
- Cancelled: 2
- Active: 1 as training ship; 1 converted to yacht
- Lost: 5 World War II; 2 Suez Crisis; 10 expended
- Preserved: 4

General characteristics RN group I
- Displacement: 1,370 long tons (1,392 t); 1,830 long tons (1,859 t) (deep load)
- Length: 283 ft (86.3 m) p/p; 301.25 ft (91.8 m) o/a
- Beam: 36 ft 6 in (11.1 m)
- Draught: 9 ft (2.7 m); 13 ft (4.0 m) (deep load)
- Propulsion: 2 × Admiralty 3-drum boilers, 2 shafts, reciprocating vertical triple expansion, 5,500 ihp (4,100 kW); (except Cam, Chelmer, Ettrick, Halladale, Helmsdale, and Tweed; Parsons single reduction steam turbines, 6,500 shp (4,800 kW)
- Speed: 20 knots (37 km/h; 23 mph); 20.5 knots (38.0 km/h; 23.6 mph) (turbine ships)
- Range: 7,200 nmi (13,300 km; 8,300 mi) at 12 knots (22 km/h; 14 mph) with; 440 long tons (447 t) oil fuel
- Complement: 107
- Armament: 2 × QF 4 in (102 mm)/40 Mk.XIX guns, single mounts CP Mk.XXIII; Up to 10 × QF 20 mm (0.79 in) Oerlikon A/A on twin mounts Mk.V and single mounts Mk.III; 1 × Hedgehog 24 spigot A/S projector; 8 × depth charge throwers, 2 × rails, Up to 150 depth charges

General characteristics (RN group II)
- Range: 646 long tons (656 t) oil fuel; 7,500 nmi (13,890 km; 8,631 mi) at 15 knots (27.8 km/h; 17.3 mph)
- Notes: Other data per RN group I

General characteristics (RCN group)
- Displacement: 1,445 long tons (1,468 t); 2,110 long tons (2,144 t) (deep load)
- Range: 646 long tons (656 t) oil fuel; 7,500 nmi (13,890 km; 8,631 mi) at 15 knots (27.8 km/h; 17.3 mph)
- Complement: 157
- Armament: 2 × QF 4-inch (101.6 mm) XVI guns on twin mount HA/LA Mk.XIX; 1 × QF 12-pdr 12 cwt (3-inch (76.20 mm)) Mk. V gun on mounting HA/LA Mk.IX (not all ships); 8 × 20 mm QF Oerlikon A/A on twin mounts Mk.V; 1 × Hedgehog 24 spigot A/S projector; Up to 150 depth charges
- Notes: Other data per RN group I

General characteristics (RAN group I)
- Displacement: 1,420 long tons (1,443 t); 2,020 long tons (2,052 t) (deep load)
- Range: 500 long tons (508 t) oil fuel; 5,180 nmi (9,593 km; 5,961 mi) at 12 knots (22.2 km/h; 13.8 mph)
- Complement: 140
- Armament: 2 × QF 4-inch (101.6 mm) Mk.XVI guns, single mounts HA/LA Mk.XX; 8 × QF 20 mm Oerlikon, single mounts Mk.III, later; 3 × QF 40 mm Bofors, single mounts Mk.VII; 4 × QF 20 mm Oerlikon, twin mounts Mk.V; 1 × Hedgehog 24 spigot A/S projector; Up to 50 depth charges
- Notes: Other data per RN group I

General characteristics (RAN group II)
- Displacement: 1,545 long tons (1,570 t); 2,185 long tons (2,220 t)
- Complement: 177
- Sensors & processing systems: SC radar
- Armament: 4 × QF 4-inch (101.6 mm) Mk.XVI guns, twin mounts HA/LA Mk.XIX; 3 × QF 40 mm Bofors, single mounts Mk.VII; 4 × QF 20 mm Oerlikon, twin mounts Mk.V; 1 × Hedgehog 24 spigot A/S projector; Up to 50 depth charges
- Notes: Other data per RAN group I

The River class was a class of 151 frigates launched between 1941 and 1944 for use as anti-submarine convoy escorts in the North Atlantic. The majority served with the Royal Navy and Royal Canadian Navy (RCN), with some serving in the other Allied navies: the Royal Australian Navy (RAN), the Free French Naval Forces, the Royal Netherlands Navy and, post-war, the South African Navy.

The Royal Navy placed the first orders in 1940, and the vessels were named after rivers in the United Kingdom, giving the name to the class. In Canada, they were called after towns and cities, although they retained the same designation. Originally called a "twin-screw corvette", the name "frigate" was suggested by Vice-Admiral Percy W. Nelles of the Royal Canadian Navy. Canada originally ordered the construction of 33 frigates in October 1941. The design was too big for the locks on the Lachine Canal so it was not built by the shipyards on the Great Lakes and therefore all the frigates built in Canada were built in dockyards along the West Coast or along the St. Lawrence River below Montreal. In all, Canada ordered the construction of 70 frigates, including ten for the Royal Navy, which transferred two (USS Asheville and USS Natchez) to the United States Navy. These served as the basis of the US Navy Tacoma class frigate series. Twelve were built in Australia for the RAN (four to a modified design).

After World War II, they found employment in many other navies the world over; several RCN ships were sunk as breakwaters. One, HMCS Stormont, was purchased by Aristotle Onassis and converted into the luxury yacht Christina O.

== Design ==
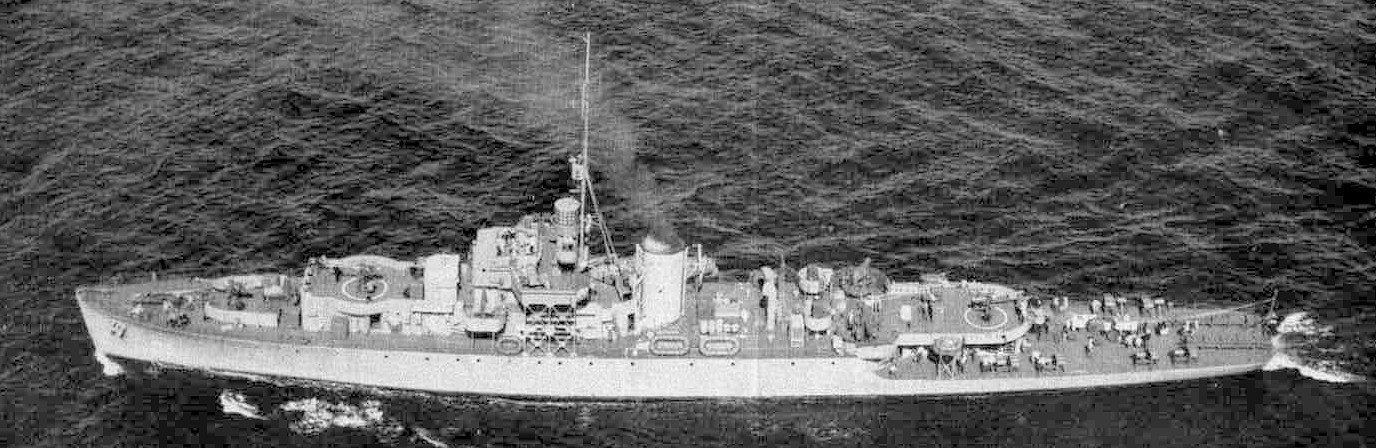
Overhead view of USS Natchez

The River-class ships were designed by naval engineer William Reed, of Smith's Dock Company of South Bank-on-Tees, to have the endurance and anti-submarine capabilities of the Black Swan-class sloops, while being quick and cheap to build in civil dockyards using the machinery (e.g. reciprocating steam engines instead of turbines) and construction techniques pioneered in the building of the Flower-class corvettes. Its purpose was to improve on the convoy escort classes in service with the Royal Navy, including the Flower class.

Improvements over the corvette design included markedly better accommodation. The twin engines gave only 3 knots (3 mph; 6 km/h) more speed but extended the range of the ship to nearly double that of a corvette to 7,200 nmi (13,300 km; 8,300 mi) at 12 kn (22 km/h; 14 mph). Among other lessons applied to the design was armament better designed to combat U-boats, including a twin 4 in (100 mm) mount forward and 12-pounder [76 millimetres (3.0 in)] aft. Fifteen Canadian frigates were initially fitted with one 4 in (100 mm) gun forward but with the exception of HMCS Valleyfield, they were all eventually upgraded to the twin mount. For underwater targets, it was equipped with a Hedgehog anti-submarine mortar, depth charge rails and four side-mounted throwers aft for a 10-charge pattern (some had 8 throwers for a 14-charge pattern for a brief period until this was abandoned).

River-class frigates were the first Royal Canadian Navy warships to carry the 147B Sword horizontal fan-beam active sonar transmitter, in addition to the regular ASDIC. This allowed the ship to maintain contact with targets even while firing, unless a target was struck. Better radar and radio direction-finding equipment enhanced the RCN's ability to locate and track enemy submarines over previous classes. The River-class design was used as the basis for the United States Navy Tacoma class (which served in the Royal Navy as the Colony class); the hull design was later elaborated into the Loch class and subsequently the Bay class.

== Ships in class ==
Two hundred and forty-three frigates were built in Britain, Canada and Australia for seven navies during World War II.

== Vessels lost in action ==
River class ships lost to enemy action
Ship	Date	Fate
HMS Cam	18 July 1944	Presumed mined. Towed to port and declared a total loss.
HMCS Chebogue	4 October 1944	Torpedoed and badly damaged by U-1227 while escorting convoy ONS 33. Towed to port and declared a total loss.
HMS Cuckmere	11 December 1943	Torpedoed and badly damaged by U-223 off Algeria. Towed to port and declared a total loss.
HMS Itchen	23 September 1943	Torpedoed and sunk by U-666 at 53°25′N 39°42′W.
HMS Lagan	20 September 1943	Torpedoed and badly damaged by U-270. Towed to port and declared a total loss.
HMCS Magog	14 October 1944	Torpedoed and badly damaged by U-1223 while escorting convoy ONS 33G. Towed to port and declared a total loss.
HMS Mourne	15 June 1944	Torpedoed and sunk by U-767 at 49°35′N 05°30′W.
HMS Teme	29 March 1945	Torpedoed and badly damaged by U-315. Towed to port and declared a total loss.
HMS Tweed	7 January 1944	Torpedoed and sunk by U-305 at 48°18′N 21°19′W.
HMCS Valleyfield	7 May 1944	Torpedoed and sunk by U-548 at 46°03′N 52°24′W.

== Survivors ==
On display in Brisbane, Australia is HMAS Diamantina, the last complete River-class frigate, preserved at the Queensland Maritime Museum.

HMCS Stormont served as a convoy escort during the Battle of the Atlantic and was present at the D-Day landings. In 1947, Greek shipowner Aristotle Onassis purchased her for scrap value and converted her into a luxurious superyacht named Christina O, after his daughter. The vessel is now owned by John Paul Nicolaou, who lets the yacht for elite charters and cruises.

SLNS Gajabahu, formerly HMCS Hallowell served as a convoy escort during World War II and later transferred to the Israeli Navy and then the Royal Ceylon Navy, which later became the Sri Lankan Navy. She was withdrawn from active duty in 1980 and is now used as a training ship by Sri Lanka.

UBS Mayu, formerly HMS Fal, is preserved in Seikkyi, Myanmar.

== In fiction ==
"HMS Saltash" was a fictional River-class frigate in Nicholas Monsarrat's 1951 book The Cruel Sea. (In the 1953 Jack Hawkins film version she is called "HMS Saltash Castle", and was played by the corvette HMS Portchester Castle.)

HMCS New Glasgow played the fictional frigate "HMS Rockhampton" in the 1955 John Wayne film The Sea Chase. (She had just been recommissioned as a Prestonian class upgrade of the Canadian River-class frigate, after ten years in reserve.)

"HMS Nairn" was a fictional River-class frigate in Alistair MacLean's 1955 book HMS Ulysses.

"HMAS Roper" was a fictional River-class frigate in Australian naval author J.E. Macdonnell's 1963 book Not Under Command. Unusually for this author, her nationality is not mentioned, but as her namesake river is specified as being in Australia's Arnhem Land, HMAS can be assumed.

== See also ==
- List of escorteurs of the French Navy
- List of patrol vessels of the United States Navy

== Bibliography ==
- Colledge, J. J.; Warlow, Ben (2006) [1969]. Ships of the Royal Navy: The Complete Record of All Fighting Ships of the Royal Navy from the 15th Century to the Present (3rd Rev ed.). London: Chatham Publishing. ISBN 978-1-86176-281-8. OCLC 67375475.
- Lavery, Brian (2006). River-Class Frigates and the Battle of the Atlantic: A Technical and Social History. London: National Maritime Museum. ISBN 0-948065-73-7.
- Lenton, H. T. (1998). British & Empire Warships of the Second World War. Annapolis, Maryland: Naval Institute Press. ISBN 1-55750-048-7.
- Marriott, Leo (1983). Royal Navy Frigates 1945–1983. Ian Allan. ISBN 0-7110-1322-5.
