= German submarine U-519 =

German World War II submarine

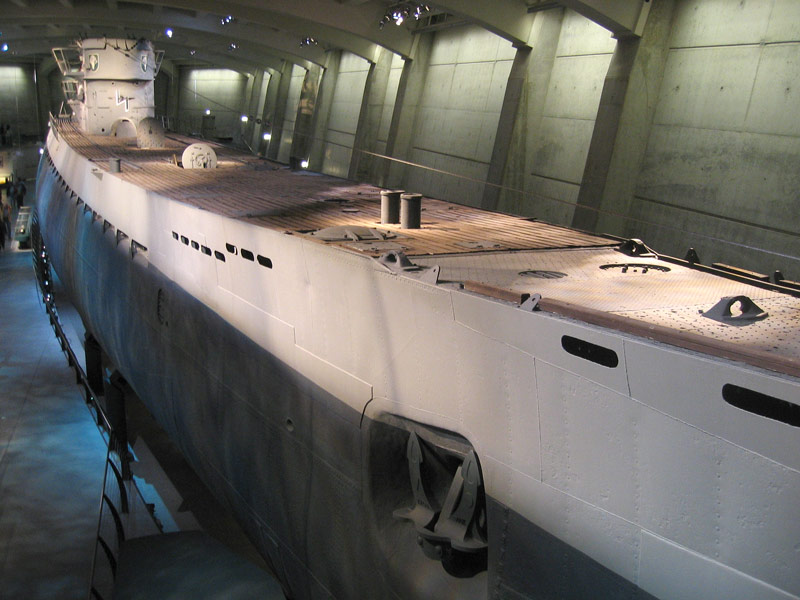
- U-505, a typical Type IXC boat

History

Nazi Germany
- Name: U-519
- Ordered: 14 February 1940
- Builder: Deutsche Werft, Hamburg
- Yard number: 334
- Laid down: 23 June 1941
- Launched: 12 February 1942
- Commissioned: 7 May 1942
- Fate: Missing in the Bay of Biscay since 31 January 1943

General characteristics
- Class & type: Type IXC submarine
- Displacement: 1,120 t (1,100 long tons) surfaced; 1,232 t (1,213 long tons) submerged
- Length: 76.76 m (251 ft 10 in) o/a; 58.75 m (192 ft 9 in) pressure hull
- Beam: 6.76 m (22 ft 2 in) o/a; 4.40 m (14 ft 5 in) pressure hull
- Height: 9.60 m (31 ft 6 in)
- Draught: 4.70 m (15 ft 5 in)
- Installed power: 4,400 PS (3,200 kW; 4,300 bhp) (diesels); 1,000 PS (740 kW; 990 shp) (electric)
- Propulsion: 2 shafts; 2 × diesel engines; 2 × electric motors
- Speed: 18.3 knots (33.9 km/h; 21.1 mph) surfaced; 7.3 knots (13.5 km/h; 8.4 mph) submerged
- Range: 13,450 nmi (24,910 km; 15,480 mi) at 10 knots (19 km/h; 12 mph) surfaced; 64 nmi (119 km; 74 mi) at 4 knots (7.4 km/h; 4.6 mph) submerged
- Test depth: 230 m (750 ft)
- Complement: 4 officers, 44 enlisted
- Armament: 6 × torpedo tubes (4 bow, 2 stern); 22 × 53.3 cm (21 in) torpedoes; 1 × 10.5 cm (4.1 in) SK C/32 deck gun (180 rounds); 1 × 3.7 cm (1.5 in) SK C/30 AA gun; 1 × 2 cm FlaK 38 AA guns

Service record
- Part of: 4th U-boat Flotilla; 7 May – 31 October 1942; 2nd U-boat Flotilla; 1 November 1942 – 31 January 1943
- Identification codes: M 44 754
- Commanders: Kptlt. Günter Eppen; 7 May 1942 – 31 January 1943
- Operations: 2 patrols: 1st patrol: 17 October – 29 December 1942; 2nd patrol: 30 – 31 January 1943
- Victories: None

German submarine U-519 was a Type IXC U-boat of Nazi Germany's Kriegsmarine during World War II. She was laid down on 23 June 1941 at the Deutsche Werft yard in Hamburg as yard number 334, launched on 12 February 1942 and commissioned on 7 May 1942 under the command of Kapitänleutnant Günter Eppen.

After training with the 4th U-boat Flotilla, U-519 was transferred to the 2nd U-boat Flotilla for front-line service on 1 November 1942.

== Design ==
German Type IXC submarines were slightly larger than the original Type IXBs. U-519 had a displacement of 1,120 tonnes (1,100 long tons) when at the surface and 1,232 tonnes (1,213 long tons) while submerged. The U-boat had a total length of 76.76 m (251 ft 10 in), a pressure hull length of 58.75 m (192 ft 9 in), a beam of 6.76 m (22 ft 2 in), a height of 9.60 m (31 ft 6 in), and a draught of 4.70 m (15 ft 5 in). The submarine was powered by two MAN M 9 V 40/46 supercharged four-stroke, nine-cylinder diesel engines producing a total of 4,400 metric horsepower (3,240 kW; 4,340 shp) for use while surfaced, two Siemens-Schuckert 2 GU 345/34 double-acting electric motors producing a total of 1,000 shaft horsepower (1,010 PS; 750 kW) for use while submerged. She had two shafts and two 1.92 m (6 ft) propellers. The boat was capable of operating at depths of up to 230 metres (750 ft).

The submarine had a maximum surface speed of 18.3 knots (33.9 km/h; 21.1 mph) and a maximum submerged speed of 7.3 knots (13.5 km/h; 8.4 mph). When submerged, the boat could operate for 63 nautical miles (117 km; 72 mi) at 4 knots (7.4 km/h; 4.6 mph); when surfaced, she could travel 13,450 nautical miles (24,910 km; 15,480 mi) at 10 knots (19 km/h; 12 mph). U-519 was fitted with six 53.3 cm (21 in) torpedo tubes (four fitted at the bow and two at the stern), 22 torpedoes, one 10.5 cm (4.13 in) SK C/32 naval gun, 180 rounds, and a 3.7 cm (1.5 in) SK C/30 as well as a 2 cm (0.79 in) C/30 anti-aircraft gun. The boat had a complement of forty-eight.

== Service history ==
=== First patrol ===
The U-boat left Kiel on 17 October 1942, moved through the gap between Iceland and the Faeroe Islands into the Atlantic Ocean and patrolled the vicinity of the Azores, joining the wolfpack Westwall between 8 November and 16 December. However she had no successes. She arrived at Lorient in occupied France on 29 December after 74 days at sea.

=== Second patrol ===
The boat departed Lorient for the last time on 30 January 1943. She has been posted missing since 31 January 1943. Her fate remains unknown. She was previously thought to have been sunk by "Tidewater Tillie," a B-24 Liberator of the 2d Antisubmarine Squadron, about six hundred miles west of Lorient. This attack was actually against U-752.

== Bibliography ==
- Busch, Rainer; Röll, Hans-Joachim (1999). German U-boat commanders of World War II : a biographical dictionary. Translated by Brooks, Geoffrey. London, Annapolis, Md: Greenhill Books, Naval Institute Press. ISBN 1-55750-186-6.
- Busch, Rainer; Röll, Hans-Joachim (1999). Deutsche U-Boot-Verluste von September 1939 bis Mai 1945 [German U-boat losses from September 1939 to May 1945]. Der U-Boot-Krieg (in German). Vol. IV. Hamburg, Berlin, Bonn: Mittler. ISBN 3-8132-0514-2.
- Gröner, Erich; Jung, Dieter; Maass, Martin (1991). U-boats and Mine Warfare Vessels. German Warships 1815–1945. Vol. 2. Translated by Thomas, Keith; Magowan, Rachel. London: Conway Maritime Press. ISBN 0-85177-593-4.
