= German submarine U-1223 =

German World War II submarine

History

Nazi Germany
- Name: U-1223
- Ordered: 25 August 1941
- Builder: Deutsche Werft AG, Hamburg
- Yard number: 386
- Laid down: 25 November 1942
- Launched: 23 June 1943
- Commissioned: 6 October 1943
- Decommissioned: 14 April 1945
- Fate: Scuttled on 5 May 1945 in position 53°32′N 8°35′E

General characteristics
- Class & type: Type IXC/40 submarine
- Displacement: 1,144 t (1,126 long tons) surfaced; 1,257 t (1,237 long tons) submerged
- Length: 76.76 m (251 ft 10 in) o/a; 58.75 m (192 ft 9 in) pressure hull
- Beam: 6.86 m (22 ft 6 in) o/a; 4.44 m (14 ft 7 in) pressure hull
- Height: 9.60 m (31 ft 6 in)
- Draught: 4.67 m (15 ft 4 in)
- Installed power: 4,400 PS (3,200 kW; 4,300 bhp) (diesels); 1,000 PS (740 kW; 990 shp) (electric)
- Propulsion: 2 shafts; 2 × diesel engines; 2 × electric motors
- Speed: 18.3 knots (33.9 km/h; 21.1 mph) surfaced; 7.3 knots (13.5 km/h; 8.4 mph) submerged
- Range: 13,850 nmi (25,650 km; 15,940 mi) at 10 knots (19 km/h; 12 mph) surfaced; 63 nmi (117 km; 72 mi) at 4 knots (7.4 km/h; 4.6 mph) submerged
- Test depth: 230 m (750 ft)
- Complement: 4 officers, 44 enlisted
- Armament: 6 × torpedo tubes (4 bow, 2 stern); 22 × 53.3 cm (21 in) torpedoes; 1 × 3.7 cm (1.5 in) Flak M42 AA gun; 2 x twin 2 cm (0.79 in) C/30 AA guns

Service record
- Part of: 4th U-boat Flotilla; 6 October 1943 – 31 July 1944; 2nd U-boat Flotilla; 1 August – 29 December 1944; 33rd U-boat Flotilla; 30 December 1944 – 15 April 1945
- Identification codes: M 53 099
- Commanders: Kptlt. Harald Bosüner; 6 October 1943 – March 1944; Oblt.z.S. Albert Kneip; March 1944 – 28 April 1945
- Operations: 1 patrol: 28 August – 24 December 1944
- Victories: 1 warship total loss (1,370 tons); 1 merchant ship damaged (7,134 GRT)

German submarine U-1223 was a Type IXC/40 U-boat built for Nazi Germany's Kriegsmarine during World War II.

== Design ==
German Type IXC/40 submarines were slightly larger than the original Type IXCs. U-1223 had a displacement of 1,144 tonnes (1,126 long tons) when at the surface and 1,257 tonnes (1,237 long tons) while submerged. The U-boat had a total length of 76.76 m (251 ft 10 in), a pressure hull length of 58.75 m (192 ft 9 in), a beam of 6.86 m (22 ft 6 in), a height of 9.60 m (31 ft 6 in), and a draught of 4.67 m (15 ft 4 in). The submarine was powered by two MAN M 9 V 40/46 supercharged four-stroke, nine-cylinder diesel engines producing a total of 4,400 metric horsepower (3,240 kW; 4,340 shp) for use while surfaced, two Siemens-Schuckert 2 GU 345/34 double-acting electric motors producing a total of 1,000 shaft horsepower (1,010 PS; 750 kW) for use while submerged. She had two shafts and two 1.92 m (6 ft) propellers. The boat was capable of operating at depths of up to 230 metres (750 ft).

The submarine had a maximum surface speed of 18.3 knots (33.9 km/h; 21.1 mph) and a maximum submerged speed of 7.3 knots (13.5 km/h; 8.4 mph). When submerged, the boat could operate for 63 nautical miles (117 km; 72 mi) at 4 knots (7.4 km/h; 4.6 mph); when surfaced, she could travel 13,850 nautical miles (25,650 km; 15,940 mi) at 10 knots (19 km/h; 12 mph). U-1223 was fitted with six 53.3 cm (21 in) torpedo tubes (four fitted at the bow and two at the stern), 22 torpedoes, and a 3.7 cm (1.5 in) Flak M42 as well as two twin 2 cm (0.79 in) C/30 anti-aircraft guns. The boat had a complement of forty-eight.

== Service history ==
U-1223 was ordered on 25 August 1941 from Deutsche Werft in Hamburg-Finkenwerder under the yard number 386. Her keel was laid down on 25 November 1942 and was launched the following year on 23 June 1943. About three months later she was commissioned into service under the command of Kapitänleutnant Harald Bosüner (Crew 35) on 6 October 1943 in the 4th U-boat Flotilla.

While working up for deployment, U-1223 Bosüner was relieved and handed over command to Oberleutnant zur See Albert Kneip (Crew X/39) in March 1944. After completing training, the U-boat transferred to the 2nd U-boat Flotilla and left Kiel for the West Atlantic on 28 August 1944 for her first and only patrol. Stopping briefly in Bergen, Norway, for replenishment, she operated off the Canadian coast, damaging HMCS Magog on 14 October 1944 and the British steamer Fort Thompson on 2 November. Magog was towed back to port, but declared a constructive loss and decommissioned.

U-1223 arrived back in Kristiansand on Christmas Eve, 24 December 1944, and continued her journey to Flensburg, where she arrived three days later. Having been transferred to the 33rd U-boat Flotilla, she left Flensburg again for Königsberg on 5 January 1945, arriving there on the tenth. The U-boat experienced technical problems in the end of January 1945 and had to be towed into Stettin. From there she travelled under tow of U-1108 to Wesermünde, where she was decommissioned on 15 April 1945. Most of her crew was ordered to form a tank destroyer unit in Neustadt in Holstein under the command of the first watch officer.

When British forces closed in on the port, the U-boat was scuttled in position 53°32′N 8°35′E on 5 May 1945. Her wreck was later broken up for scrap.

== Summary of raiding history ==
Date	Ship Name	Nationality	Tonnage (Note: Merchant ship tonnages are in gross register tons. Military vessels are listed by tons displacement.)	Fate
14 October 1944	HMCS Magog	Royal Canadian Navy	1,370	Total loss
2 November 1944	Fort Thompson	United Kingdom	7,134	Damaged

== Bibliography ==
- Busch, Rainer; Röll, Hans-Joachim (1999). German U-boat commanders of World War II: a biographical dictionary. Translated by Brooks, Geoffrey. London, Annapolis, Md: Greenhill Books, Naval Institute Press. ISBN 1-55750-186-6.
- Busch, Rainer; Röll, Hans-Joachim (1999). Deutsche U-Boot-Verluste von September 1939 bis Mai 1945 [German U-boat losses from September 1939 to May 1945]. Der U-Boot-Krieg (in German). Vol. IV. Hamburg, Berlin, Bonn: Mittler. ISBN 3-8132-0514-2.
- Gröner, Erich; Jung, Dieter; Maass, Martin (1991). German Warships 1815–1945, U-boats and Mine Warfare Vessels. Vol. 2. Translated by Thomas, Keith; Magowan, Rachel. London: Conway Maritime Press. ISBN 0-85177-593-4.
