= HMCS Chebogue =

1943 Canadian River-class frigate

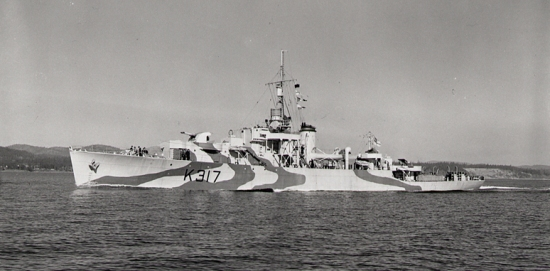
- HMCS Chebogue

History

Canada
- Name: Chebogue
- Namesake: Chebogue, Nova Scotia
- Operator: Royal Canadian Navy
- Ordered: June 1942
- Builder: Yarrows, Esquimalt
- Yard number: 88
- Laid down: 19 March 1943
- Launched: 17 August 1943
- Commissioned: 22 February 1944
- Decommissioned: 25 September 1945
- Identification: Pennant number:K 317
- Honours and awards: Atlantic 1942-43
- Fate: Scrapped 1948.

General characteristics
- Class & type: River-class frigate
- Displacement: 1,445 long tons (1,468 t; 1,618 short tons); 2,110 long tons (2,140 t; 2,360 short tons) (deep load)
- Length: 283 ft (86.26 m) p/p; 301.25 ft (91.82 m)o/a
- Beam: 36.5 ft (11.13 m)
- Draught: 9 ft (2.74 m); 13 ft (3.96 m) (deep load)
- Propulsion: 2 x Admiralty 3-drum boilers, 2 shafts, reciprocating vertical triple expansion, 5,500 ihp (4,100 kW)
- Speed: 20 knots (37.0 km/h); 20.5 knots (38.0 km/h) (turbine ships)
- Range: 646 long tons (656 t; 724 short tons) oil fuel; 7,500 nautical miles (13,890 km) at 15 knots (27.8 km/h)
- Complement: 157
- Armament: 2 × QF 4 in (102 mm) /45 Mk. XVI on twin mount HA/LA Mk.XIX; 8 × 20 mm QF Oerlikon A/A on twin mounts Mk.V; 1 × Hedgehog 24 spigot A/S projector; up to 150 depth charges

HMCS Chebogue (K317) was a River-class frigate that served with the Royal Canadian Navy during the Second World War. She served primarily as an ocean convoy escort in the Battle of the Atlantic. She was named for Chebogue, Nova Scotia. During the war she was torpedoed and declared a constructive loss.

Chebogue was ordered in June 1942 as part of the 1942–1943 River-class building program. She was laid down on 19 March 1943 by Yarrows Ltd. at Esquimalt and launched 17 August 1943. She was commissioned into the Royal Canadian Navy on 22 February 1943 at Esquimalt.

== Background ==
The River-class frigate was designed by William Reed of Smith's Dock Company of South Bank-on-Tees. Originally called a "twin-screw corvette", its purpose was to improve on the convoy escort classes in service with the Royal Navy at the time, including the Flower-class corvette. The first orders were placed by the Royal Navy in 1940 and the vessels were named for rivers in the United Kingdom, giving name to the class. In Canada they were named for towns and cities though they kept the same designation. The name "frigate" was suggested by Vice-Admiral Percy Nelles of the Royal Canadian Navy and was adopted later that year.

Improvements over the corvette design included improved accommodation which was markedly better. The twin engines gave only three more knots of speed but extended the range of the ship to nearly double that of a corvette at 7,200 nautical miles (13,300 km) at 12 knots. Among other lessons applied to the design was an armament package better designed to combat U-boats including a twin 4-inch mount forward and 12-pounder aft. 15 Canadian frigates were initially fitted with a single 4-inch gun forward but with the exception of HMCS Valleyfield, they were all eventually upgraded to the double mount. For underwater targets, the River-class frigate was equipped with a Hedgehog anti-submarine mortar and depth charge rails aft and four side-mounted throwers.

River-class frigates were the first Royal Canadian Navy warships to carry the 147B Sword horizontal fan echo sonar transmitter in addition to the irregular ASDIC. This allowed the ship to maintain contact with targets even while firing unless a target was struck. Improved radar and direction-finding equipment improved the RCN's ability to find and track enemy submarines over the previous classes.

Canada originally ordered the construction of 33 frigates in October 1941. The design was too big for the shipyards on the Great Lakes so all the frigates built in Canada were built in dockyards along the west coast or along the St. Lawrence River. In all Canada ordered the construction of 60 frigates including ten for the Royal Navy that transferred two to the United States Navy.

== War service ==
After transiting to Halifax and arriving on 12 April 1944, Chebogue was sent to work up at Bermuda. Upon her return in May, she was assigned to the Mid-Ocean Escort Force escort group C-1 as a trans-Atlantic convoy escort. On her second return trip to Canada with a convoy she was torpedoed.

=== Torpedoing ===
On 4 October 1944 while escorting ONS 33, a convoy made up of slower ships, Chebogue was hit by a GNAT fired by U-1227. GNAT was the codename (German Naval Acoustic Torpedo) the Allies gave to the torpedo that tracked targets by the sounds they made. At the time the convoy was 800 miles (1,300 km) from the British Isles. Seven men were killed in the resulting explosion with the loss of 10 metres (33 ft) off her stern. With part of her stern missing, Chebogue was unable to move under her own steam and had to be taken under tow. A succession of HMCS Chambly, HMS Mounsey, HMCS Ribble and the ocean tug, HMS Earner towed her roughly 900 miles (1,400 km) before the towline parted in a gale and Chebogue was driven ashore in Swansea Bay, Wales. The RNLI lifeboat Edward, Prince of Wales was despatched to aid in the rescue of the ship's crew. The weather worsened going from 40-knot (74 km/h; 46 mph) winds to those of 70 knots (130 km/h; 81 mph). For recovering the crew of Chebogue Coxswain William Gammon was awarded the Gold Medal for Gallantry, with Second Coxswain Tom Ace and Mechanic Gilbert Davies receiving the Bronze Medal.

Chebogue was re-floated and taken to Port Talbot where she was declared a constructive loss. Chebogue was placed in reserve at Port Talbot until December when she was towed to Newport, Wales where it was intended to make her seaworthy enough to be towed across the Atlantic Ocean. That plan was cancelled and Chebogue was instead taken to Milford Haven and paid off 25 September 1945. She was broken up in 1948.
