= German submarine U-1227 =

German World War II submarine

History

Nazi Germany
- Name: U-1227
- Ordered: 14 October 1941
- Builder: Deutsche Werft, Hamburg
- Yard number: 390
- Laid down: 1 February 1943
- Launched: 18 September 1943
- Commissioned: 8 December 1943
- Decommissioned: 10 April 1945
- Fate: Scuttled on 3 May 1945. Later raised and broken up.

General characteristics
- Class & type: Type IXC/40 submarine
- Displacement: 1,144 t (1,126 long tons) surfaced; 1,257 t (1,237 long tons) submerged
- Length: 76.76 m (251 ft 10 in) o/a; 58.75 m (192 ft 9 in) pressure hull
- Beam: 6.86 m (22 ft 6 in) o/a; 4.44 m (14 ft 7 in) pressure hull
- Height: 9.60 m (31 ft 6 in)
- Draught: 4.67 m (15 ft 4 in)
- Installed power: 4,400 PS (3,200 kW; 4,300 bhp) (diesels); 1,000 PS (740 kW; 990 shp) (electric)
- Propulsion: 2 shafts; 2 × diesel engines; 2 × electric motors
- Speed: 18.3 knots (33.9 km/h; 21.1 mph) surfaced; 7.3 knots (13.5 km/h; 8.4 mph) submerged
- Range: 13,850 nmi (25,650 km; 15,940 mi) at 10 knots (19 km/h; 12 mph) surfaced; 63 nmi (117 km; 72 mi) at 4 knots (7.4 km/h; 4.6 mph) submerged
- Test depth: 230 m (750 ft)
- Complement: 4 officers, 44 enlisted
- Armament: 6 × torpedo tubes (4 bow, 2 stern); 22 × 53.3 cm (21 in) torpedoes; 1 × 3.7 cm (1.5 in) Flak M42 AA gun; 2 x twin 2 cm (0.79 in) C/30 AA guns

Service record
- Part of: 31st U-boat Flotilla; 8 December 1943 – 31 July 1944; 2nd U-boat Flotilla; 1 August – 31 December 1944; 33rd U-boat Flotilla; 1 January – 10 April 1945
- Identification codes: M 54 328
- Commanders: Oblt.z.S. Friedrich Altmeier; 8 December 1943 – 10 April 1945
- Operations: 1 patrol: a. 14 September – 26 December 1944; b. 27 – 29 December 1944; c. 2 – 4 January 1945
- Victories: 1 warship total loss (1,370 tons)

German submarine U-1227 was a Type IXC/40 U-boat of Nazi Germany's Kriegsmarine during World War II.

The submarine was laid down on 1 February 1943 at the Deutsche Werft yard at Hamburg, launched on 18 September 1943, and commissioned on 8 December 1943 under the command of Oberleutnant zur See Friedrich Altmeier. The U-boat then served with 31st U-boat Flotilla, a training unit, with 2nd U-boat Flotilla from 1 August until 31 December 1944, and with 33rd U-boat Flotilla from 1 January until 10 April 1945.

== Design ==
German Type IXC/40 submarines were slightly larger than the original Type IXCs. U-1227 had a displacement of 1,144 tonnes (1,126 long tons) when at the surface and 1,257 tonnes (1,237 long tons) while submerged. The U-boat had a total length of 76.76 m (251 ft 10 in), a pressure hull length of 58.75 m (192 ft 9 in), a beam of 6.86 m (22 ft 6 in), a height of 9.60 m (31 ft 6 in), and a draught of 4.67 m (15 ft 4 in). The submarine was powered by two MAN M 9 V 40/46 supercharged four-stroke, nine-cylinder diesel engines producing a total of 4,400 metric horsepower (3,240 kW; 4,340 shp) for use while surfaced, two Siemens-Schuckert 2 GU 345/34 double-acting electric motors producing a total of 1,000 shaft horsepower (1,010 PS; 750 kW) for use while submerged. She had two shafts and two 1.92 m (6 ft) propellers. The boat was capable of operating at depths of up to 230 metres (750 ft).

The submarine had a maximum surface speed of 18.3 knots (33.9 km/h; 21.1 mph) and a maximum submerged speed of 7.3 knots (13.5 km/h; 8.4 mph). When submerged, the boat could operate for 63 nautical miles (117 km; 72 mi) at 4 knots (7.4 km/h; 4.6 mph); when surfaced, she could travel 13,850 nautical miles (25,650 km; 15,940 mi) at 10 knots (19 km/h; 12 mph). U-1227 was fitted with six 53.3 cm (21 in) torpedo tubes (four fitted at the bow and two at the stern), 22 torpedoes, and a 3.7 cm (1.5 in) Flak M42 as well as two twin 2 cm (0.79 in) C/30 anti-aircraft guns. The boat had a complement of forty-eight.

== Service history ==
U-1227 completed only one combat patrol, from 14 September until 26 December 1944. On 4 October 1944 she attempted to attack a convoy at night, but was seen in the bright moonlight and counter-attacked by convoy escorts. She torpedoed one of the escorts, the Canadian River-class frigate HMCS Chebogue, during the pursuit. The frigate was a total loss, but the U-boat escaped and continued its patrol.

=== Fate ===
U-1227 was damaged at Kiel in a British night-bombing raid on 9 April 1945, and was decommissioned there on 10 April. U-1227 was scuttled to avoid capture on 3 May 1945.

== Summary of raiding history ==
Date	Ship Name	Nationality	Tonnage (Note: Merchant ship tonnages are in gross register tons. Military vessels are listed by tons displacement.)	Fate
4 October 1944	HMCS Chebogue	Royal Canadian Navy	1,370	Total loss

== Bibliography ==
- Bishop, Chris (2006). Kriegsmarine U-Boats, 1939–45. London: Amber Books. ISBN 978-1-904687-96-2.
- Busch, Rainer; Röll, Hans-Joachim (1999). German U-boat commanders of World War II : a biographical dictionary. Translated by Brooks, Geoffrey. London, Annapolis, Md: Greenhill Books, Naval Institute Press. ISBN 1-55750-186-6.
- Busch, Rainer; Röll, Hans-Joachim (1999). Deutsche U-Boot-Verluste von September 1939 bis Mai 1945 [German U-boat losses from September 1939 to May 1945]. Der U-Boot-Krieg (in German). Vol. IV. Hamburg, Berlin, Bonn: Mittler. ISBN 3-8132-0514-2.
- Gröner, Erich; Jung, Dieter; Maass, Martin (1991). German Warships 1815–1945, U-boats and Mine Warfare Vessels. Vol. 2. Translated by Thomas, Keith; Magowan, Rachel. London: Conway Maritime Press. ISBN 0-85177-593-4.
