= John Paul Papanicolaou =

Greek shipbuilder and businessman (1949-2010)

John Paul Papanicolaou (23 March 1949 – 14 February 2010) was a Greek shipbuilder and businessman leading in the industry during his era. He was passionate in purchasing and overhauling historically monumental vessels. As a friend of the Onassis family, he is best known for his purchase and grand restoration of the Onassis yacht, Christina O in 1998, adding the ”O” (Ω) to the ship's name. He also purchased and renewed the former Yugoslavian presidential yacht Galeb, which was the third largest yacht in the world and voyaged by Josip Broz Tito himself at one time.

John-Paul Papanicolaou died in Athens, Greece on February 14, 2010, after two years of fighting a terminal illness.
