= 2024 Trophée des Champions =

- Event: Trophée des Champions
Paris Saint-Germain	Monaco
1	0
- Date: 5 January 2025
- Venue: Stadium 974, Doha, Qatar
- Man of the Match: Ousmane Dembélé (Paris Saint-Germain)
- Referee: Willy Delajod
- Attendance: 39,682

The 2024 Trophée des Champions was the 29th edition of the French super cup. The match was contested by Paris Saint-Germain, the winners of the 2023–24 Ligue 1 and 2023–24 Coupe de France titles, and Monaco, the runners-up of the 2023–24 Ligue 1.

Paris Saint-Germain won the match 1–0 for their record thirteenth Trophée des Champions title.

== Host selection ==
The match was initially scheduled for 8 August 2024 in Beijing, China. On 3 July 2024, it was postponed by the Ligue de Football Professionnel (LFP). On 18 November 2024, the LFP confirmed that the game would take place in Doha, Qatar, on 5 January 2025. Other considered host countries included Monaco and Ivory Coast. On 12 December 2024, the venue was revealed to be Stadium 974.

== Venue ==
City	Stadium	Location of the host city of the 2024 Trophée des Champions.
Doha	Stadium 974	Location of the host city of the 2024 Trophée des Champions.
Capacity: 44,089		Location of the host city of the 2024 Trophée des Champions.

== Match ==
=== Details ===
5 January 2025
19:30 AST

Paris Saint-Germain	1–0	Monaco
Dembélé 90+2'	Report

Stadium 974, Doha
Attendance: 39,682
Referee: Willy Delajod

Paris Saint-Germain	Monaco

GK	1	(Italy) Gianluigi Donnarumma
RB	2	(Morocco) Achraf Hakimi
CB	5	(Brazil) Marquinhos (c)
CB	51	(Ecuador) Willian Pacho
LB	25	(Portugal) Nuno Mendes	(yellow card) 23'
CM	33	(France) Warren Zaïre-Emery		(substituted off) 88'
CM	17	(Portugal) Vitinha
CM	87	(Portugal) João Neves		(substituted off) 67'
RW	19	(South Korea) Lee Kang-in		(substituted off) 67'
CF	10	(France) Ousmane Dembélé
LW	14	(France) Désiré Doué		(substituted off) 72'
Substitutes:
GK	39	(Russia) Matvey Safonov
DF	21	(France) Lucas Hernandez
DF	35	(Brazil) Lucas Beraldo
DF	42	(France) Yoram Zague
MF	8	(Spain) Fabián Ruiz		(substituted on) 67'
MF	24	(France) Senny Mayulu		(substituted on) 88'
FW	9	(Portugal) Gonçalo Ramos		(substituted on) 72'
FW	11	(Spain) Marco Asensio
FW	29	(France) Bradley Barcola	(yellow card) 87'	(substituted on) 67'
Manager:
(Spain) Luis Enrique

GK	16	(Switzerland) Philipp Köhn
RB	2	(Brazil) Vanderson	(yellow card) 35'	(substituted off) 86'
CB	22	(Ghana) Mohammed Salisu
CB	5	(Germany) Thilo Kehrer
LB	12	(Brazil) Caio Henrique
CM	10	(Russia) Aleksandr Golovin		(substituted off) 72'
CM	6	(Switzerland) Denis Zakaria (c)
RW	11	(France) Maghnes Akliouche		(substituted off) 86'
AM	18	(Japan) Takumi Minamino
LW	7	(Morocco) Eliesse Ben Seghir
CF	21	(Nigeria) George Ilenikhena		(substituted off) 72'
Substitutes:
GK	50	(France) Yann Lienard
DF	4	(Netherlands) Jordan Teze		(substituted on) 86'
DF	20	(France) Kassoum Ouattara
DF	46	(France) Bradel Kiwa
DF	88	(France) Soungoutou Magassa		(substituted on) 86'
MF	8	(Belgium) Eliot Matazo
MF	15	(Senegal) Lamine Camara		(substituted on) 72'
MF	42	(France) Saïmon Bouabré
FW	36	(Switzerland) Breel Embolo		(substituted on) 72'
Manager:
(Austria) Adi Hütter

Man of the Match:
Ousmane Dembélé (Paris Saint-Germain)

Assistant referees:
Erwan Finjean
Philippe Jeanne
Fourth official:
Abdelatif Kherradji
Video assistant referee:
Hamid Guénaoui
Assistant video assistant referee:
Cédric Dos Santos

Match rules

- 90 minutes.
- Penalty shoot-out if scores level.
- Nine named substitutes, of which up to five may be used. (Note: Each team was given only three opportunities to make substitutions, excluding substitutions made at half-time.)

== See also ==
- 2024–25 Ligue 1
- 2024–25 Coupe de France
- 2024–25 AS Monaco FC season
- 2024–25 Paris Saint-Germain FC season
