= 2025–26 AS Monaco FC season =

Monaco
2025–26 season
- President: Dmitry Rybolovlev
- Head coach: Adi Hütter (until 9 October); Sébastien Pocognoli (from 11 October)
- Stadium: Stade Louis II
- Ligue 1: 7th
- Coupe de France: Round of 16
- UEFA Champions League: Knockout phase play-offs
- Top goalscorer: League: Folarin Balogun (13); All: Folarin Balogun (19)
- Average home league attendance: 8,153
Home colours	Away colours	Third colours

The 2025–26 season was the 107th season in the history of Monaco, and the club's 13th consecutive season in Ligue 1. In addition to the domestic league, the club also participated in the Coupe de France and the UEFA Champions League.

== Players ==
=== First-team squad ===
As of 13 January 2026

Note: Flags indicate national team as defined under FIFA eligibility rules; some limited exceptions apply. Players may hold more than one non-FIFA nationality.

No.	Pos.	Nation	Player
1	GK	FIN	Lukas Hradecky
2	DF	BRA	Vanderson
3	DF	ENG	Eric Dier
4	DF	NED	Jordan Teze
5	DF	GER	Thilo Kehrer (vice-captain)
6	MF	SUI	Denis Zakaria (captain)
8	MF	FRA	Paul Pogba
9	FW	USA	Folarin Balogun
10	MF	RUS	Aleksandr Golovin (3rd captain)
11	MF	FRA	Maghnes Akliouche
12	DF	BRA	Caio Henrique
13	DF	FRA	Christian Mawissa
14	FW	DEN	Mika Biereth
15	MF	SEN	Lamine Camara
16	GK	SUI	Philipp Köhn

No.	Pos.	Nation	Player
17	MF	BEL	Stanis Idumbo
18	FW	JPN	Takumi Minamino
19	FW	NGR	George Ilenikhena
20	DF	FRA	Kassoum Ouattara
21	FW	FRA	Lucas Michal
22	DF	GHA	Mohammed Salisu
23	MF	FRA	Aladji Bamba
25	DF	BEL	Wout Faes (on loan from Leicester City)
27	FW	SEN	Krépin Diatta
28	DF	FRA	Mamadou Coulibaly
29	FW	GER	Paris Brunner
31	FW	ESP	Ansu Fati (on loan from Barcelona)
40	GK	FRA	Jules Stawiecki
43	FW	FRA	Pape Cabral
50	GK	FRA	Yann Lienard

== Transfers ==
=== In ===
No.	Pos.	Player	Transferred from	Fee	Date	Source
8	MF	(France) Paul Pogba	Free agent	Free	28 June 2025	
31	FW	(Spain) Ansu Fati	(Spain) Barcelona	Loan with option to buy	1 July 2025	
3	DF	(England) Eric Dier	(Germany) Bayern Munich	Free	1 July 2025	
1	GK	(Finland) Lukas Hradecky	(Germany) Bayer Leverkusen	€2,000,000	8 August 2025	
25	DF	(Belgium) Wout Faes	(England) Leicester City	Loan with option to buy	13 January 2026	

=== Out ===
Pos.	Player	Transferred to	Fee	Date	Source
DF	(Senegal) Ismail Jakobs	(Turkey) Galatasaray	€8,000,000	1 July 2025	
DF	(Ivory Coast) Valy Konaté	(Belgium) Cercle Brugge	Loan	1 July 2025	
FW	(France) Edan Diop	(Belgium) Cercle Brugge	Loan	18 July 2025	

== Pre-season friendlies ==
11 July 2025 Friendly	Monaco	1–0	Cercle Brugge	La Turbie
18:30 CEST (UTC+2)	Caio Henrique (yellow card) 39'; Camara (yellow card) 63'; Gomis 78' (o.g.)	Report	Konaté (yellow card) 19' (yellow-red card) 28'; Ravych (yellow card) 63'	Stadium: Monaco Training Center

16 July 2025 Friendly	Coventry City	0–5	Monaco	Burton upon Trent
17:00 BST (UTC+1)		Report	Biereth 27'; Bouabré 37'; Akliouche 61', 70', 86'	Stadium: St. George’s Park

19 July 2025 Friendly	Nottingham Forest	0–0	Monaco	Chesterfield
15:00 BST (UTC+1)		Report		Stadium: SMH Group Stadium

26 July 2025 Friendly	Arminia Bielefeld	0–3	Monaco	Bielefeld
15:00 CEST (UTC+2)	Young (yellow card) 41'	Report	Magassa (yellow card) 16'; Golovin (yellow card) 23'; Biereth 24'; Brunner 50'; Akliouche 61'	Stadium: SchücoArena; Attendance: 20,216

30 July 2025 Friendly	Monaco	3–1	Torino	La Turbie
18:00 CEST (UTC+2)	Biereth 16'; Camara 45'; Golovin 64'	Report	Gineitis 6'; Tameze (yellow card) 84'	Stadium: Monaco Training Center

31 July 2025 Friendly	Monaco	3–1	Torino	La Turbie
10:30 CEST (UTC+2)	Balogun 22'; Ouattara 42'; Mawissa 68'	Report	Casadei 47'	Stadium: Monaco Training Center

3 August 2025 Friendly	Ajax	2–2	Monaco	Amsterdam
14:00 CEST (UTC+2)	Taylor 29'; Traoré 87'	Report	Biereth 34'; Minamino 65'	Stadium: Johan Cruyff Arena; Attendance: 52,705

8 August 2025 Friendly	Monaco	1–2	Inter Milan	Monaco
20:00 CEST (UTC+2)	Akliouche 2'	Report	Çalhanoğlu (red card) 36'; L. Martínez 60'; Bonny 80'	Stadium: Stade Louis II; Attendance: 10,000

== Competitions ==
=== Overall record ===
Competition	First match	Last match	Starting round	Final position	Record							
Competition	First match	Last match	Starting round	Final position	Pld	W	D	L	GF	GA	GD	Win %
Ligue 1	16 August 2025	17 May 2026	Matchday 1	7th	34	16	6	12	60	54	+6	47.06
Coupe de France	21 December 2025	5 February 2026	Round of 64	Round of 16	3	2	0	1	6	5	+1	66.67
UEFA Champions League	18 September 2025	25 February 2026	League phase	Knockout phase play-offs	10	2	5	3	12	19	−7	20.00
Total					47	20	11	16	78	78	+0	42.55

Source: Soccerway

=== Ligue 1 ===
==== League table ====
Pos	Team	Pld	W	D	L	GF	GA	GD	Pts	Qualification or relegation
5	Marseille	34	18	5	11	63	45	+18	59	Qualification for the Europa League league phase (Note: Since the 2025–26 Coupe de France winners, Lens, qualified for the Champions League via league position, the Europa League spot awarded to the cup winners was passed to the sixth-placed team, and the Conference League spot was passed to the seventh-placed team.)
6	Rennes	34	17	8	9	59	50	+9	59	Qualification for the Europa League league phase
7	Monaco	34	16	6	12	60	54	+6	54	Qualification for the Conference League play-off round
8	Strasbourg	34	15	8	11	58	47	+11	53	
9	Toulouse	34	12	9	13	47	46	+1	45	

Source: Ligue 1
Rules for classification: 1) Points; 2) Goal difference; 3) Head-to-head points; 4) Head-to-head goal difference; 5) Head-to-head goals scored; 6) Head-to-head away goals scored; 7) Goals scored; 8) Away goals scored; 9) Fair-play points (Note: Head-to-head record is used only after all the matches between the teams in question have been played).

==== Results summary ====
Overall								Home						Away					
Pld	W	D	L	GF	GA	GD	Pts	W	D	L	GF	GA	GD	W	D	L	GF	GA	GD
34	16	6	12	60	54	+6	54	10	2	5	33	23	+10	6	4	7	27	31	−4

Source: Ligue 1

==== Results by round ====
Round	1	2	3	4	5	6	7	8	9	10	11	12	13	14	15	16	17	18	19	20	21	22	23	24	25	26	27	28	29	30	31	32	33	34
Ground	H	A	H	A	H	A	H	A	H	A	H	H	A	H	A	A	H	H	A	H	A	H	A	H	A	H	A	H	A	H	A	A	H	A
Result	W	L	W	W	W	L	D	D	W	W	L	L	L	W	L	L	L	L	D	W	D	W	W	W	W	W	W	W	L	D	D	W	L	L
Position	1	8	4	3	1	4	5	7	6	2	5	6	8	7	7	9	9	9	10	10	10	8	8	7	7	6	6	5	7	7	7	6	7	7

Source: Ligue 1
A = Away; H = Home; W = Win; D = Draw; L = Loss

==== Matches ====
The match schedule was released on 27 June 2025.

16 August 2025 1	Monaco	3–1	Le Havre	Monaco
19:00 CEST (UTC+2)	Lloris 32' (o.g.); Dier 61'; Akliouche 74'	Report	Ndiaye 67'; Lloris (yellow card) 89'	Stadium: Stade Louis II; Attendance: 11,734; Referee: Ruddy Buquet

24 August 2025 2	Lille	1–0	Monaco	Villeneuve-d'Ascq
20:45 CEST (UTC+2)	Bentaleb (yellow card) 86'; Giroud 90+1', (penalty missed) 90+9'	Report	Camara (yellow card) 87'; Mawissa (yellow card) 90+8'	Stadium: Stade Pierre-Mauroy; Attendance: 43,549; Referee: Willy Delajod

31 August 2025 3	Monaco	3–2	Strasbourg	Monaco
17:15 CEST (UTC+2)	Akliouche 6', (yellow card) 90+11'; Balogun 48'; Minamino 90+6'; Mamadou Coulibaly (yellow card) 90+11'	Report	Doukouré (yellow card) 8'; Bakwa 73'; Panichelli 76' (pen.); Nzingoula (red card) 90+9'	Stadium: Stade Louis II; Attendance: 8,718; Referee: Benoît Bastien

13 September 2025 4	Auxerre	1–2	Monaco	Auxerre
21:05 CEST (UTC+2)	Casimir (yellow card) 55' (yellow-red card) 68'; Owusu (yellow card) 64'; Salisu 73' (o.g.)	Report	Zakaria (yellow card) 38'; Ouattara (yellow card) 42'; Minamino 45+2', (yellow card) 55'; Bamba (yellow card) 72'; Brunner (yellow card) 75'; Ilenikhena 89'; Caio Henrique (yellow card) 90+3'	Stadium: Stade de l'Abbé-Deschamps; Attendance: 16,703; Referee: Romain Lissorgue

21 September 2025 5	Monaco	5–2	Metz	Monaco
17:05 CEST (UTC+2)	Biereth 28'; Teze (yellow card) 43'; Fati 46', 83'; Kouao 86' (o.g.); Ilenikhena 90+3'	Report	Diallo 13'; Hein 67' (pen.)	Stadium: Stade Louis II; Attendance: 6,080; Referee: Stéphanie Frappart

27 September 2025 6	Lorient	3–1	Monaco	Lorient
17:00 CEST (UTC+2)	Bamba 40', (yellow card) 48'; Karim (yellow card) 46'; Pagis 76', 82'	Report	Kehrer (yellow card) 9' (yellow-red card) 38'; Vanderson (yellow card) 21'; Fati 90+8' (pen.)	Stadium: Stade du Moustoir; Attendance: 15,561; Referee: Ruddy Buquet

5 October 2025 7	Monaco	2–2	Nice	Monaco
17:15 CEST (UTC+2)	Fati 45+5' (pen.), 56' (pen.); Salisu (yellow card) 71'	Report	Abdi (yellow card) 24' (yellow-red card) 34'; Diop 29', 42' (pen.); Bombito (yellow card) 51'	Stadium: Stade Louis II; Attendance: 8,306; Referee: Willy Delajod

18 October 2025 8	Angers	1–1	Monaco	Angers
19:00 CEST (UTC+2)	Arcus (yellow card) 48'; Cherif 85', (yellow card) 90+4'	Report	Salisu (yellow card) 1'; Teze (yellow card) 60'; Balogun 72'	Stadium: Stade Raymond Kopa; Attendance: 13,423; Referee: Jérémy Stinat

25 October 2025 9	Monaco	1–0	Toulouse	Monaco
19:00 CEST (UTC+2)	Salisu 3'; Golovin (yellow card) 18'; Coulibaly (yellow card) 45'; Kehrer (yellow card) 66'	Report	Francis (yellow card) 34'; Emersonn (yellow card) 54'; Methalie (yellow card) 67'; Cresswell (yellow card) 90+5'	Stadium: Stade Louis II; Attendance: 7,086; Referee: Guillaume Paradis

29 October 2025 10	Nantes	3–5	Monaco	Nantes
21:05 CET (UTC+1)	Tati (yellow card) 16'; Guirassy 19', 45+6'; Abline (yellow card) 77'; Mohamed 80'; Centonze (yellow card) 88'	Report	Coulibaly 6', (yellow card) 25'; Minamino (yellow card) 34'; Balogun 41'; Akliouche 55'; Salisu (yellow card) 57'; Kehrer (yellow card) 62'; Teze (yellow card) 62'; Golovin 75', 90+4'; Ouattara (yellow card) 82'; Köhn (yellow card) 84'	Stadium: Stade de la Beaujoire; Attendance: 33,653; Referee: Jérôme Brisard

1 November 2025 11	Monaco	0–1	Paris FC	Monaco
19:00 CET (UTC+1)	Coulibaly (yellow card) 81'; Minamino (yellow card) 85'; Fati (yellow card) 90+8'	Report	Otávio (yellow card) 36'; Camara (yellow card) 47'; Simon 53'	Stadium: Stade Louis II; Attendance: 10,727; Referee: Eric Wattellier

8 November 2025 12	Monaco	1–4	Lens	Monaco
21:05 CET (UTC+1)	Balogun 37' (pen.), (red card) 45'; Fati (penalty missed) 90+3'; Zakaria (yellow card) 90+5'	Report	Édouard 21'; Saïd 40', 60'; Sangaré 45+3'; Gradit (yellow card) 57'; Aguilar (yellow card) 74'	Stadium: Stade Louis II; Attendance: 9,456; Referee: Bastien Dechepy

22 November 2025 13	Rennes	4–1	Monaco	Rennes
19:00 CET (UTC+1)	Boudlal 20'; Camara 48'; Embolo 73'; Blas 83' (pen.)	Report	Akliouche (yellow card) 19'; Zakaria (red card) 65'; Biereth 90+5'	Stadium: Roazhon Park; Attendance: 27,681; Referee: Hakim Ben El Hadj

29 November 2025 14	Monaco	1–0	Paris Saint-Germain	Monaco
17:00 CET (UTC+1)	Camara (yellow card) 12'; Minamino 68'; Kehrer (red card) 80'; Diatta (yellow card) 88'; Teze (yellow card) 90+5'	Report	Vitinha (yellow card) 33'	Stadium: Stade Louis II; Attendance: 11,546; Referee: Clément Turpin

5 December 2025 15	Brest	1–0	Monaco	Brest
19:00 CET (UTC+1)	Doumbia 28', (yellow card) 44'; Ajorque (red card) 60'; Mboup (yellow card) 78'	Report	Minamino (yellow card) 10'; Caio Henrique (yellow card) 27'; Vanderson (yellow card) 52'; Teze (yellow card) 90+4'	Stadium: Stade Francis-Le Blé; Attendance: 14,522; Referee: Thomas Léonard

14 December 2025 16	Marseille	1–0	Monaco	Marseille
20:45 CET (UTC+1)	Kondogbia (yellow card) 40'; Greenwood 82', (yellow card) 83'	Report	Vanderson (yellow card) 64'	Stadium: Stade Vélodrome; Attendance: 64,509; Referee: François Letexier

3 January 2026 17	Monaco	1–3	Lyon	Monaco
17:00 CET (UTC+1)	Kehrer (yellow card) 7'; Coulibaly 45+4', (red card) 70'; Balogun (yellow card) 78'	Report	Mata (yellow card) 35'; Šulc 38', 57'; Kluivert (yellow card) 70'; Tolisso (yellow card) 70'; Abner 79'	Stadium: Stade Louis II; Attendance: 11,828; Referee: Jérôme Brisard

16 January 2026 18	Monaco	1–3	Lorient	Monaco
19:00 CET (UTC+1)	Zakaria (yellow card) 70'; Fati 76'	Report	Dieng 68'; Makengo 85'; Karim 87'	Stadium: Stade Louis II; Attendance: 4,810; Referee: Willy Delajod

24 January 2026 19	Le Havre	0–0	Monaco	Le Havre
19:00 CET (UTC+1)		Report	Ouattara (yellow card) 21'; Balogun (yellow card) 78'; Kehrer (yellow card) 85'	Stadium: Stade Océane; Attendance: 19,033; Referee: Marc Bollengier

31 January 2025 20	Monaco	4–0	Rennes	Monaco
21:05 CET (UTC+1)	Teze (yellow card) 22'; Fati 33'; Akliouche 50'; Coulibaly 59'; Idumbo 89'	Report	Embolo (yellow card) 12'; Brassier (yellow card) 28'	Stadium: Stade Louis II; Attendance: 5,319; Referee: Ruddy Buquet

8 February 2026 21	Nice	0–0	Monaco	Nice
15:00 CET (UTC+1)	Diop (yellow card) 18'; Wahi (yellow card) 90'	Report	Balogun (yellow card) 13'; Vanderson (yellow card) 88'	Stadium: Allianz Riviera; Attendance: 24,243; Referee: Benoît Bastien

13 February 2026 22	Monaco	3–1	Nantes	Monaco
21:05 CET (UTC+1)	Adingra 25', 28'; Zakaria 30'; Camara (yellow card) 45+1'; Coulibaly (yellow card) 45+3'; Golovin (yellow card) 64' (yellow-red card) 65'; Teze (yellow card) 82'	Report	Centonze 45+1'; Awaziem (yellow card) 87'; Sissoko (yellow card) 90+1'	Stadium: Stade Louis II; Attendance: 5,237; Referee: Eric Wattellier

21 February 2026 23	Lens	2–3	Monaco	Lens
17:00 CET (UTC+1)	Édouard 3'; Thauvin 56'; Abdulhamid (yellow card) 74'; Ganiou (yellow card) 90+4'	Report	Balogun 62'; Zakaria 70'; Fati 72'; Faes (yellow card) 90+2'; Teze (yellow card) 90+5'	Stadium: Stade Bollaert-Delelis; Attendance: 37,727; Referee: Willy Delajod

28 February 2026 24	Monaco	2–0	Angers	Monaco
19:00 CET (UTC+1)	Balogun 57'; Adingra 62'	Report	Pona (yellow card) 45'; Belkhdim (yellow card) 57'; Djibirin (yellow card) 82'	Stadium: Stade Louis II; Attendance: 5,186; Referee: Guillaume Paradis

6 March 2026 25	Paris Saint-Germain	1–3	Monaco	Paris
20:45 CET (UTC+1)	Barcola 71'; Hakimi (yellow card) 90+1'	Report	Akliouche 27'; Faes (yellow card) 45+4'; Golovin 55'; Balogun (yellow card) 71', (goal) 73'; Camara (yellow card) 76'	Stadium: Parc des Princes; Attendance: 46,806; Referee: Ruddy Buquet

14 March 2026 26	Monaco	2–0	Brest	Monaco
21:05 CET (UTC+1)	Balogun 19'; Kehrer (yellow card) 36'; Bamba (yellow card) 47'; Golovin 78'	Report	Diaz (yellow card) 45+2'	Stadium: Stade Louis II; Attendance: 5,288; Referee: Jérémie Pignard

22 March 2026 27	Lyon	1–2	Monaco	Décines-Charpieu
15:00 CET (UTC+1)	Šulc 42'; Tagliafico (red card) 89'	Report	Golovin (yellow card) 39'; Faes (yellow card) 53'; Akliouche 62'; Balogun 72' (pen.); Diatta (yellow card) 86'	Stadium: Parc Olympique Lyonnais; Attendance: 56,039; Referee: François Letexier

5 April 2026 28	Monaco	2–1	Marseille	Monaco
20:45 CEST (UTC+2)	Camara (yellow card) 8'; Golovin 59'; Kehrer (yellow card) 70'; Balogun 74'	Report	Medina (yellow card) 34'; Gouiri 85'; Balerdi (yellow card) 87'	Stadium: Stade Louis II; Attendance: 10,495; Referee: Clément Turpin

10 April 2026 29	Paris FC	4–1	Monaco	Paris
19:00 CEST (UTC+2)	Ikoné 4', 21'; Immobile 8'; Camara (yellow card) 59'; Koleosho 71'	Report	Balogun 36'	Stadium: Stade Jean-Bouin; Attendance: 16,520; Referee: Romain Lissorgue

19 April 2026 30	Monaco	2–2	Auxerre	Monaco
15:00 CEST (UTC+2)	Akliouche (yellow card) 7'; Fati 56'; Balogun 59' (pen.); Zakaria (yellow card) 60'	Report	Danois 11'; Sinayoko 33', (yellow card) 73'; Sy (yellow card) 83'; Mensah (yellow card) 90+5'	Stadium: Stade Louis II; Attendance: 8,473; Referee: Thomas Léonard

25 April 2026 31	Toulouse	2–2	Monaco	Toulouse
21:05 CEST (UTC+2)	Cresswell (yellow card) 31'; Russell-Rowe 61'; Nicolaisen (yellow card) 66'; Emersonn 90'; Sauer (yellow card) 90+2'	Report	Teze 6'; Camara 18'; Mawissa (yellow card) 62'; Hradecky (yellow card) 75'	Stadium: Stadium de Toulouse; Attendance: 24,750; Referee: Clément Turpin

2 May 2026 32	Metz	1–2	Monaco	Longeville-lès-Metz
19:00 CEST (UTC+2)	Deminguet 49'	Report	Balogun 61'; Coulibaly (yellow card) 62'; Mawissa (yellow card) 81'; Fati 90+1'	Stadium: Stade Saint-Symphorien; Attendance: 24,083; Referee: Ruddy Buquet

10 May 2026 33	Monaco	0–1	Lille	Monaco
21:00 CEST (UTC+2)	Coulibaly (yellow card) 79'	Report	Bouaddi (yellow card) 23'; Fernandez-Pardo (yellow card) 54'; Zakaria 72' (o.g.); Perrin (yellow card) 75'	Stadium: Stade Louis II; Attendance: 8,314; Referee: Clément Turpin

17 May 2026 34	Strasbourg	5–4	Monaco	Strasbourg
21:00 CEST (UTC+2)	Godo 34', 84'; Moreira 58'; Nanasi 61', 72'; Noubissie (yellow card) 69'	Report	Camara 10', 42', (yellow card) 51'; Mawissa (yellow card) 31'; Fati 45+2'; Doukouré 55' (o.g.)	Stadium: Stade de la Meinau; Attendance: 30,321; Referee: Benoît Bastien

=== Coupe de France ===
21 December 2025 Round of 64	Auxerre	1–2	Monaco	Auxerre
14:45 CET (UTC+1)	Dioussé 29' (pen.); Sy (yellow card) 45+2'; Danois (yellow card) 54'; Senaya (yellow card) 75'; Matondo (yellow card) 78'	Report	Biereth 8', 74'; Mawissa (yellow card) 32'; Caio Henrique (yellow card) 45+6'; Zakaria (yellow card) 69'	Stadium: Stade de l'Abbé-Deschamps; Attendance: 9,833; Referee: Romain Lissorgue

10 January 2026 Round of 32	Orléans	1–3	Monaco	Orléans
15:30 CET (UTC+1)	Mouton (yellow card) 79'; El Khoumisti 90+6'	Report	Balogun 27'; Idumbo (yellow card) 29' (yellow-red card) 43'; Teze (yellow card) 56'; Ilenikhena 88', 90+4'	Stadium: Stade de la Source; Attendance: 6,800; Referee: Stéphanie Frappart

5 February 2026 Round of 16	Strasbourg	3–1	Monaco	Strasbourg
21:00 CET (UTC+1)	Godo 7'; Barco (yellow card) 22'; Enciso 55', 61'	Report	Biereth (yellow card) 11', (goal) 58'; Vanderson (yellow card) 22'; Zakaria (yellow card) 27'; Golovin (yellow card) 40'	Stadium: Stade de la Meinau; Attendance: 29,586; Referee: Jérémy Stinat

=== UEFA Champions League ===
==== League phase ====
The draw for the league phase was held on 28 August 2025.

Pos	Team	Pld	W	D	L	GF	GA	GD	Pts	Qualification
19	(Royal Belgian Football Association) Club Brugge	8	3	1	4	15	17	−2	10	Advance to knockout phase play-offs (unseeded)
20	(Turkish Football Federation) Galatasaray	8	3	1	4	9	11	−2	10	Advance to knockout phase play-offs (unseeded)
21	(French Football Federation) Monaco	8	2	4	2	8	14	−6	10	Advance to knockout phase play-offs (unseeded)
22	(Association of Football Federations of Azerbaijan) Qarabağ	8	3	1	4	13	21	−8	10	Advance to knockout phase play-offs (unseeded)
23	(Norwegian Football Federation) Bodø/Glimt	8	2	3	3	14	15	−1	9	Advance to knockout phase play-offs (unseeded)

Source: UEFA
Rules for classification: League phase tiebreakers

Round	1	2	3	4	5	6	7	8
Ground	A	H	H	A	A	H	A	H
Result	L	D	D	W	D	W	L	D
Position	33	30	27	19	23	19	21	21
Points	0	1	2	5	6	9	9	10

Source: UEFA
A = Away; H = Home; W = Win; D = Draw; L = Loss

18 September 2025 1	Club Brugge (Belgium)	4–1	(France) Monaco	Bruges, Belgium
18:45 CEST (UTC+2)	Mignolet (yellow card) 10'; Tresoldi 32'; Onyedika 39'; Vanaken 42', (yellow card) 67'; Diakhon 75'	Report	Akliouche (penalty missed) 10'; Mawissa (yellow card) 42'; Coulibaly (yellow card) 72'; Fati 90+1'	Stadium: Jan Breydel Stadium; Attendance: 25,007; Referee: Simone Sozza (Italy)

1 October 2025 2	Monaco (France)	2–2	(England) Manchester City	Monaco
21:00 CEST (UTC+2)	Teze 18'; Diatta (yellow card) 63'; Dier 90' (pen.)	Report	Haaland 15', 44'; Donnarumma (yellow card) 39'; Rodri (yellow card) 57'; Silva (yellow card) 88'; González (yellow card) 89'; Savinho (yellow card) 90+4'	Stadium: Stade Louis II; Attendance: 11,275; Referee: Jesús Gil Manzano (Spain)

22 October 2025 3	Monaco (France)	0–0	(England) Tottenham Hotspur	Monaco
21:00 CEST (UTC+2)		Report	Richarlison (yellow card) 47'	Stadium: Stade Louis II; Attendance: 11,365; Referee: Marco Guida (Italy)

4 November 2025 4	Bodø/Glimt (Norway)	0–1	(France) Monaco	Bodø, Norway
21:00 CET (UTC+1)	Auklend (yellow card) 4'; Gundersen (red card) 81'	Report	Kehrer (yellow card) 24'; Salisu (yellow card) 42'; Balogun 43'; Ouattara (yellow card) 88'; Golovin (yellow card) 90+5'	Stadium: Aspmyra Stadion; Attendance: 7,842; Referee: Damian Sylwestrzak (Poland)

26 November 2025 5	Pafos (Cyprus)	2–2	(France) Monaco	Limassol, Cyprus
19:45 EET (UTC+2)	David Luiz 18', (yellow card) 88'; Goldar (yellow card) 45+3'; Salisu 88' (o.g.)	Report	Minamino 5'; Camara (yellow card) 21'; Balogun 26'; Golovin (yellow card) 28'; Salisu (yellow card) 90+1'	Stadium: Alphamega Stadium; Attendance: 8,347; Referee: Ivan Kružliak (Slovakia)

9 December 2025 6	Monaco (France)	1–0	(Turkey) Galatasaray	Monaco
21:00 CET (UTC+1)	Zakaria (penalty missed) 51'; Balogun 68'; Biereth (yellow card) 90+6'	Report	Sánchez (yellow card) 50'; Yılmaz (yellow card) 88'	Stadium: Stade Louis II; Attendance: 9,887; Referee: Danny Makkelie (Netherlands)

20 January 2026 7	Real Madrid (Spain)	6–1	(France) Monaco	Madrid, Spain
21:00 CET (UTC+1)	Mbappé 5', 26'; Bellingham (yellow card) 44', (goal) 80'; Mastantuono 51'; Kehrer 55' (o.g.); Vinícius 63'	Report	Zakaria (yellow card) 33'; Teze 72'	Stadium: Bernabéu; Attendance: 73,599; Referee: Espen Eskås (Norway)

28 January 2026 8	Monaco (France)	0–0	(Italy) Juventus	Monaco
21:00 CET (UTC+1)	Kehrer (yellow card) 63'; Camara (yellow card) 71'	Report	Yıldız (yellow card) 77'; Adžić (yellow card) 85'	Stadium: Stade Louis II; Attendance: 10,287; Referee: José María Sánchez Martínez (Spain)

==== Knockout phase ====
===== Knockout phase play-offs =====
The draw for the knockout phase play-offs was held on 30 January 2026.

17 February 2026 First leg	Monaco (France)	2–3	(France) Paris Saint-Germain	Monaco
21:00 CET (UTC+1)	Balogun 1', 18'; Faes (yellow card) 21'; Zakaria (yellow card) 29'; Golovin (red card) 48'	Report	Vitinha (penalty missed) 22'; Doué 29', 67'; Hakimi 41'	Stadium: Stade Louis II; Attendance: 10,287; Referee: Jesús Gil Manzano (Spain)

25 February 2026 Second leg	Paris Saint-Germain (France)	2–2 (5–4 agg.)	(France) Monaco	Paris, France
21:00 CET (UTC+1)	Marquinhos 60'; Kvaratskhelia 66'; Safonov (yellow card) 90+4'	Report	Zakaria (yellow card) 24'; Akliouche 45'; Vanderson (yellow card) 48'; Coulibaly (yellow card) 55' (yellow-red card) 58'; Teze 90+1'; Nibombé (yellow card) 90+4'	Stadium: Parc des Princes; Attendance: 47,511; Referee: István Kovács (Romania)

== Statistics ==
=== Appearances and goals ===
No.	Pos	Nat	Player	Total		Ligue 1		Coupe de France		UEFA Champions League	
No.	Pos	Nat	Player	Apps	Goals	Apps	Goals	Apps	Goals	Apps	Goals
Goalkeepers
1	GK	(Finland) FIN	Lukáš Hrádecký	20	0	17	0	1	0	2	0
16	GK	(Switzerland) SUI	Philipp Köhn	29	0	17+2	0	2	0	8	0
50	GK	(France) FRA	Yann Lienard	0	0	0	0	0	0	0	0
Defenders
2	DF	(Brazil) BRA	Vanderson	23	0	7+7	0	1	0	8	0
3	DF	(England) ENG	Eric Dier	14	2	7+3	1	1	0	3	1
4	DF	(Netherlands) NED	Jordan Teze	44	4	27+6	1	2	0	7+2	3
5	DF	(Germany) GER	Thilo Kehrer	39	0	27	0	3	0	7+2	0
12	DF	(Brazil) BRA	Caio Henrique	32	0	16+4	0	3	0	9	0
13	DF	(France) FRA	Christian Mawissa	22	0	13+5	0	1	0	1+2	0
20	DF	(France) FRA	Kassoum Ouattara	24	0	12+3	0	1+1	0	2+5	0
22	DF	(Ghana) GHA	Mohammed Salisu	18	1	12	1	1	0	5	0
25	DF	(Belgium) BEL	Wout Faes	15	0	12+1	0	0	0	2	0
49	DF	(France) FRA	Ilane Touré	2	0	0+2	0	0	0	0	0
Midfielders
6	MF	(Switzerland) SUI	Denis Zakaria	32	2	22+1	2	3	0	6	0
8	MF	(France) FRA	Paul Pogba	6	0	1+5	0	0	0	0	0
10	MF	(Russia) RUS	Aleksandr Golovin	34	5	20+4	5	3	0	6+1	0
11	MF	(France) FRA	Maghnes Akliouche	43	7	28+3	6	2	0	10	1
15	MF	(Senegal) SEN	Lamine Camara	29	3	21+2	3	1	0	5	0
17	MF	(Belgium) BEL	Stanis Idumbo	12	1	0+8	1	1+2	0	0+1	0
21	MF	(France) FRA	Lucas Michal	4	0	0+2	0	0	0	0+2	0
23	MF	(France) FRA	Aladji Bamba	24	0	9+8	0	0+2	0	2+3	0
28	MF	(France) FRA	Mamadou Coulibaly	35	3	15+10	3	1+1	0	5+3	0
43	MF	(Senegal) SEN	Pape Cabral	6	0	0+4	0	0	0	0+2	0
44	MF	(Belgium) BEL	Samuel Nibombé	1	0	0	0	0	0	0+1	0
Forwards
9	FW	(United States) USA	Folarin Balogun	43	19	26+4	13	2+1	1	10	5
14	FW	(Denmark) DEN	Mika Biereth	44	6	13+20	3	3	3	1+7	0
18	FW	(Japan) JPN	Takumi Minamino	21	4	11+4	3	1	0	4+1	1
19	FW	(France) FRA	George Ilenikhena	20	4	3+12	2	0+2	2	0+3	0
24	FW	(Ivory Coast) CIV	Simon Adingra	16	2	10+4	2	0	0	1+1	0
27	FW	(Senegal) SEN	Krépin Diatta	22	0	10+8	0	0+1	0	2+1	0
29	FW	(Germany) GER	Paris Brunner	6	0	1+5	0	0	0	0	0
31	FW	(Spain) ESP	Ansu Fati	29	12	9+15	11	0	0	3+2	1
Players transferred out during the season
7	MF	(Morocco) MAR	Eliesse Ben Seghir	2	0	0+2	0	0	0	0	0

Source: Competitions
