= Mamadou Coulibaly (footballer, born 2004) =

French footballer (born 2004)

Personal information
- Date of birth: 21 April 2004 (age 22)
- Place of birth: Paris, France
- Height: 1.80 m (5 ft 11 in)
- Position: Midfielder

Team information
- Current team: Monaco
- Number: 28

Youth career
- Sevran FC
- Villepinte FC
- FC Épinay
- 2019–2024: Monaco

Senior career*
| Years | Team | Apps | (Gls) |
| 2024– | Monaco | 34 | (3) |

International career^{‡}
| 2024 | France U20 | 1 | (0) |
| 2026– | France U21 | 2 | (0) |
- * Club domestic league appearances and goals as of 22:26, 4 September 2026 (UTC) ‡ National team caps and goals as of 30 March 2026

Mamadou Coulibaly (born 21 April 2004) is a French professional footballer who plays as a midfielder for Ligue 1 club Monaco.

== Club career ==
Coulibaly is a youth product of Sevran FC, Villepinte FC, FC Épinay before moving to Monaco's academy in 2019. On 6 May 2022, he signed his first professional contract with Monaco until 2025. He made his senior and professional debut with Monaco as a substitute in a 3–1 Coupe de France win over Rodez on 20 January 2024. On 29 October 2025, he scored his first goal and provided an assist in a 5–3 away win over Nantes.

== International career ==
Born in France, Coulibaly is of Malian descent. In March 2024, he was called up to the France U20s for a set of friendlies.

== Career statistics ==
=== Club ===
As of match played 4 September 2026

Appearances and goals by club, season and competition
| Club | Season | League | | | National cup | | Europe | | Other | | Total | |
| Club | Season | Division | Apps | Goals | Apps | Goals | Apps | Goals | Apps | Goals | Apps | Goals |
|---|---|---|---|---|---|---|---|---|---|---|---|---|
| Monaco | 2023–24 | Ligue 1 | 5 | 0 | 1 | 0 | — | | — | | 6 | 0 |
| Monaco | 2024–25 | Ligue 1 | 1 | 0 | 0 | 0 | 0 | 0 | — | | 1 | 0 |
| Monaco | 2025–26 | Ligue 1 | 25 | 3 | 2 | 0 | 9 (Note: Appearances in UEFA Champions League) | 0 | — | | 36 | 3 |
| Monaco | 2026–27 | Ligue 1 | 3 | 0 | 0 | 0 | 1 (Note: Appearances in UEFA Conference League) | 1 | — | | 4 | 1 |
| Career total | | | 34 | 3 | 3 | 0 | 10 | 1 | 0 | 0 | 47 | 4 |

== Honours ==
Monaco U19

- Championnat National U19 runner-up: 2021–22
