= Lucas Michal =

French footballer (born 2005)

Personal information
- Date of birth: 22 June 2005 (age 21)
- Place of birth: Bourg-la-Reine, France
- Height: 1.72 m (5 ft 8 in)
- Positions: Forward; right winger

Team information
- Current team: Cercle Brugge (on loan from Monaco)

Youth career
- 2013–2015: Ivry
- 2015–2018: Paris FC
- 2018–2020: US Torcy
- 2020–2024: Monaco

Senior career*
Years	Team	Apps	(Gls)
2024–	Monaco	11	(0)
2026	→ Metz (loan)	9	(0)
2026–	→ Cercle Brugge (loan)	0	(0)

International career^{‡}
2021	France U17	9	(0)
2024	France U19	9	(1)
2024–2025	France U20	19	(10)
2025–	France U21	1	(0)
Medal record
Men's football
Representing France
UEFA European Under-19 Championship
Runner-up	2024 Northern Ireland
- * Club domestic league appearances and goals as of 26 April 2026 ‡ National team caps and goals as of 17 November 2025

Lucas Michal (born 22 June 2005) is a French professional footballer who plays as a forward or right winger for Belgian Pro League club Cercle Brugge, on loan from Ligue 1 club Monaco.

== Club career ==
Michal is a youth product of Ivry, Paris FC and US Torcy before moving to the youth academy of Monaco in 2020. On 24 May 2023, he signed his first professional contract with Monaco until 2026. He made his senior and professional debut with Monaco as a substitute in a 4–0 Ligue 1 win over Nantes on 19 May 2024.

On 2 February 2026, he joined Metz on loan from Monaco until the end of the season.

He joined Cercle Brugge on loan for the 2026–27 season.

== International career ==
Michal was born in Metropolitan France and is of Martiniquais descent. He was called up to the France U19s for the 2024 UEFA European Under-19 Championship.

== Career statistics ==
As of match played 26 April 2026

Appearances and goals by club, season and competition
Club	Season	League			Cup		Europe		Other		Total	
Club	Season	Division	Apps	Goals	Apps	Goals	Apps	Goals	Apps	Goals	Apps	Goals
Monaco	2023–24	Ligue 1	1	0	3	0	—		—		1	0
Monaco	2024–25	Ligue 1	8	0	2	0	3 (Note: Appearances in UEFA Champions League)	0	—		13	0
Monaco	2025–26	Ligue 1	2	0	0	0	2	0	—		4	0
Monaco	2026–27	Ligue 1	0	0	0	0	0	0	—		0	0
Monaco	Total		11	0	5	0	5	0	—		21	0
Metz (loan)	2025–26	Ligue 1	9	0	—		—		—		9	0
Career total			20	0	5	0	5	0	0	0	30	0

== Honours ==
France U19

- UEFA European Under-19 Championship runner-up: 2024

France U20

- Maurice Revello Tournament: 2025

Individual

- FIFA U-20 World Cup Bronze Boot: 2025
