= Samuel Nibombé =

Belgian footballer (born 2007)

Personal information
- Full name: Samuel Kondi Nibombe
- Date of birth: 15 August 2007 (age 19)
- Place of birth: Mons, Belgium
- Height: 1.98 m (6 ft 6 in)
- Positions: Centre-back; defensive midfielder

Team information
- Current team: Monaco
- Number: 44

Youth career
- 2015–2018: Mons
- 2018–2021: Anderlecht
- 2021–2023: Charleroi
- 2023–2025: Monaco

Senior career*
Years	Team	Apps	(Gls)
2025–	Monaco	1	(0)

International career^{‡}
2022	Belgium U16	7	(0)
2022–2023	Belgium U16	17	(1)
2023–2024	Belgium U17	6	(0)
2024	Belgium U18	4	(1)
2025–	Belgium U19	3	(0)
- * Club domestic league appearances and goals as of 28 February 2026 ‡ National team caps and goals as of 25 February 2026

Samuel Kondi Nibombe (born 15 August 2007) is a Belgian professional footballer who plays as a defender for Ligue 1 club Monaco.

== Club career ==
Born in Mons, in Wallonia, Belgium, Samuel Nibombé is the son of Togo international footballer Daré Nibombé, who then played for RAEC Mons.

He is a youth product of Mons, Anderlecht and Charleroi, from where he joined the Monaco youth academy in the summer 2023, signing his first professional contract with the Ligue 1 club.

In March 2025, he signed a new contract with Monaco lasting until 2027.

Having become a leader of Monaco youth team in both the under-19 championships and the Youth League, he also appeared on the bench on several occasion with the first team during the 2024–25 season. But his progress was halted by a cardiac accident during a youth game in May 2025, coming back on the pitch half a year later, and eventually making his way back with the first team in December 2025.

Nibombé made his professional debut with Monaco in a 2–2 Champions League draw with reigning champions Paris Saint-Germain on 25 February 2026.

== International career ==
Born in Belgium, Nibombé also has Togolese origins. He is a youth international for Belgium, having played for all the youth teams between under-15 and under-19, regularly captaining the selections.
