= Eliesse Ben Seghir =

Morocco international footballer (born 2005)

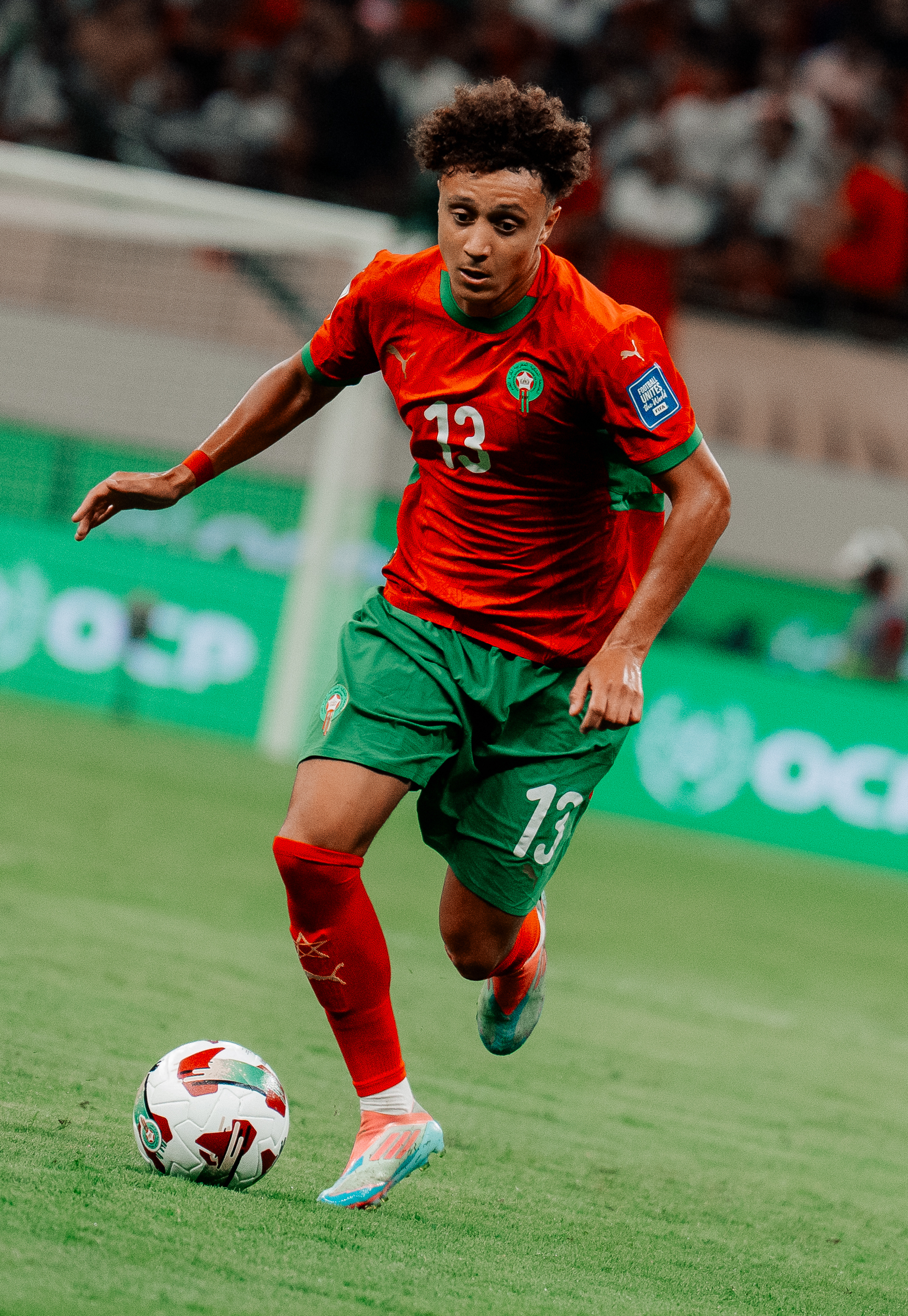
- Ben Seghir with Morocco in 2025

Personal information
- Date of birth: 16 February 2005 (age 21)
- Place of birth: Gassin, France
- Height: 1.79 m (5 ft 10 in)
- Positions: Left winger; left midfielder

Team information
- Current team: Bayer Leverkusen
- Number: 29

Youth career
- 2010–2016: SC Cogolinois
- 2016–2018: Fréjus Saint-Raphaël
- 2018–2020: SC Cogolinois
- 2020–2022: Monaco

Senior career*
Years	Team	Apps	(Gls)
2022–2025	Monaco	67	(12)
2025–	Bayer Leverkusen	10	(0)

International career^{‡}
2021–2022	France U17	2	(0)
2022–2023	France U18	9	(3)
2023	France U19	5	(3)
2024–	Morocco U23	6	(0)
2024–	Morocco	20	(3)
Medal record
Men's football
Representing Morocco
Africa Cup of Nations
Winner	2025 Morocco
Olympic Games
Bronze medal – third place	2024 Paris	Team
- * Club domestic league appearances and goals as of 17:30, 16 May 2026 (UTC) ‡ National team caps and goals as of 23:05, 14 January 2026 (UTC)

Eliesse Ben Seghir (Arabic: إلياس بن صغير; born 16 February 2005) is a professional footballer who plays as a left winger or left midfielder for Bundesliga club Bayer Leverkusen and the Morocco national team.

== Club career ==
=== Monaco ===
==== Youth career ====
Ben Seghir is a youth product of the academies of SC Cogolinois, Fréjus Saint-Raphaël, and Monaco. He signed his first professional contract with Monaco on 5 August 2022, and made his senior and professional debut with the club as a late substitute in a 4–1 UEFA Europa League win over Red Star Belgrade on 3 November 2022.

==== First Team ====
On 28 December 2022, Ben Seghir made his Ligue 1 debut for Monaco as a half-time substitute in a match against Auxerre. He scored two goals, both of which put Monaco in the lead, to help his team come out victorious by a score of 3–2. On 27 November 2024, he scored his first UEFA Champions League goal in a 3–2 home defeat against Benfica.

=== Bayer Leverkusen ===
On 31 August 2025, Ben Seghir joined Bundesliga side Bayer Leverkusen for a deal worth €30 million + add-ons, signing a five-year deal until June 2030.

== International career ==
Ben Seghir was a youth international for France, having played for the France U18s.

Ben Seghir made his debut for the senior Morocco national team on 22 March 2024 in a friendly against Angola.

On 11 December 2025, Ben Seghir was called up to the Morocco squad for the 2025 Africa Cup of Nations.

== Career statistics ==
=== Club ===
As of match played 16 September 2026

Appearances and goals by club, season and competition
Club	Season	League			National cup (Note: Includes Coupe de France, DFB-Pokal)		Europe		Other		Total	
Club	Season	Division	Apps	Goals	Apps	Goals	Apps	Goals	Apps	Goals	Apps	Goals
Monaco	2022–23	Ligue 1	19	4	1	0	3 (Note: Appearances in UEFA Europa League)	0	—		23	4
Monaco	2023–24	Ligue 1	13	2	1	0	—		—		14	2
Monaco	2024–25	Ligue 1	33	6	2	1	10 (Note: Appearances in UEFA Champions League)	2	1 (Note: Appearance in Trophée des Champions)	0	46	9
Monaco	2025–26	Ligue 1	2	0	—		—		—		2	0
Monaco	Total		67	12	4	1	13	2	1	0	85	15
Bayer Leverkusen	2025–26	Bundesliga	10	0	1	0	4	0	—		15	0
Bayer Leverkusen	2026–27	Bundesliga	0	0	0	0	1	0	—		1	0
Bayer Leverkusen	Total		10	0	1	0	5	0	—		16	0
Career total			77	12	5	1	18	2	1	0	101	15

=== International ===
As of match played 14 January 2026

Appearances and goals by national team and year
National team	Year	Apps	Goals
Morocco	2024	8	3
Morocco	2025	10	0
Morocco	2026	2	0
Total		20	3

Morocco score listed first, score column indicates score after each Ben Seghir goal.

List of international goals scored by Eliesse Ben Seghir
No.	Date	Venue	Cap	Opponent	Score	Result	Competition
1	7 June 2024	Adrar Stadium, Agadir, Morocco	3	Zambia	2–0	2–1	2026 FIFA World Cup qualification
2	15 October 2024	Honor Stadium, Oujda, Morocco	6	Central African Republic	1–0	4–0	2025 Africa Cup of Nations qualification
3	15 October 2024	Honor Stadium, Oujda, Morocco	6	Central African Republic	2–0	4–0	2025 Africa Cup of Nations qualification

== Personal life ==
Born in France, Ben Seghir holds both French and Moroccan nationalities. He is the younger brother of fellow footballer Salim Ben Seghir.

== Honours ==
Monaco U19

- Championnat National U19 runner-up: 2021–22

Morocco U23

- Olympic Bronze Medal: 2024

Morocco

- Africa Cup of Nations: 2025
