= 2024–25 AS Monaco FC season =

Monaco
2024–25 season
- President: Dmitry Rybolovlev
- Head coach: Adi Hütter
- Stadium: Stade Louis II
- Ligue 1: 3rd
- Coupe de France: Round of 32
- Trophée des Champions: Runners-up
- UEFA Champions League: Knockout phase play-offs
- Top goalscorer: League: Mika Biereth (13); All: Mika Biereth (13)
- Average home league attendance: 9,354
Home colours	Away colours	Third colours

The 2024–25 season was the 106th season in the history of AS Monaco FC, and the club's 12th consecutive season in Ligue 1. In addition to the domestic league, the club participated in the Coupe de France, the Trophée des Champions and the UEFA Champions League.

This was Monaco's first season since 2018–19 without striker Wissam Ben Yedder, who departed the club following the end of his contract.

== Players ==
=== First-team squad ===
As of 11 January 2025

Note: Flags indicate national team as defined under FIFA eligibility rules; some limited exceptions apply. Players may hold more than one non-FIFA nationality.

No.	Pos.	Nation	Player
1	GK	POL	Radosław Majecki
2	DF	BRA	Vanderson
4	DF	NED	Jordan Teze
5	DF	GER	Thilo Kehrer (vice-captain)
6	MF	SUI	Denis Zakaria (captain)
7	MF	MAR	Eliesse Ben Seghir
8	MF	BEL	Eliot Matazo
9	FW	USA	Folarin Balogun
10	MF	RUS	Aleksandr Golovin (3rd captain)
11	MF	FRA	Maghnes Akliouche
12	DF	BRA	Caio Henrique
13	DF	FRA	Christian Mawissa
14	FW	DEN	Mika Biereth

No.	Pos.	Nation	Player
15	MF	SEN	Lamine Camara
16	GK	SUI	Philipp Köhn
17	DF	CIV	Wilfried Singo
18	FW	JPN	Takumi Minamino
20	DF	FRA	Kassoum Ouattara
21	FW	NGR	George Ilenikhena
22	DF	GHA	Mohammed Salisu
27	FW	SEN	Krépin Diatta
28	MF	FRA	Mamadou Coulibaly
36	FW	SUI	Breel Embolo
37	MF	FRA	Edan Diop
50	GK	FRA	Yann Lienard
88	DF	FRA	Soungoutou Magassa

== Transfers ==
=== In ===
Pos.	Player	Transferred from	Fee	Date	Source
DF	(Germany) Thilo Kehrer	(England) West Ham United	€11,000,000	1 July 2024	
FW	(France) George Ilenikhena	(Belgium) Antwerp	€16,000,000	25 July 2024	
MF	(Senegal) Lamine Camara	(France) Metz	€15,000,000	30 July 2024	
DF	(France) Christian Mawissa	(France) Toulouse	€15,000,000	11 August 2024	
FW	(Germany) Paris Brunner	(Germany) Borussia Dortmund II	€4,000,000	16 August 2024	
DF	(Netherlands) Jordan Teze	(Netherlands) PSV Eindhoven	€10,000,000	20 August 2024	
FW	(Denmark) Mika Biereth	(Austria) Sturm Graz	€13,000,000	11 January 2025	

=== Out ===
Pos.	Player	Transferred to	Fee	Date	Source
FW	(France) Wissam Ben Yedder	Free agent	Released	1 July 2024	
MF	(Mali) Mohamed Camara	(Qatar) Al Sadd	€16,500,000	30 July 2024	
FW	(Netherlands) Myron Boadu	(Germany) Bochum	Loan	9 August 2024	
MF	(France) Félix Lemaréchal	(France) Strasbourg	€6,000,000	13 August 2024	
FW	(Germany) Paris Brunner	(Belgium) Cercle Brugge	Loan	16 August 2024	
MF	(France) Youssouf Fofana	(Italy) Milan	€25,000,000	17 August 2024	
DF	(Chile) Guillermo Maripán	(Italy) Torino	€2,000,000	17 August 2024	
DF	(France) Chrislain Matsima	(Germany) FC Augsburg	Loan	30 August 2024	
DF	(Senegal) Ismail Jakobs	(Turkey) Galatasaray	Loan	13 September 2024	

== Friendlies ==
=== Pre-season ===
6 July 2024 Friendly	Monaco	0–1	Servette	La Turbie
11:00 CEST (UTC+2)	Camara (yellow card) 37'; Köhn (yellow card) 60'	Report	Guillemenot 65'	Stadium: Monaco Training Center

13 July 2024 Friendly	Monaco	1–1	Cercle Brugge	La Turbie
10:30 CEST (UTC+2)	Kehrer 12'	Report	Denkey 10' (pen.); Francis (yellow card) 17'	Stadium: Monaco Training Center

20 July 2024 Friendly	Sturm Graz	2–2	Monaco	Windischgarsten, Austria
18:00 CEST (UTC+2)	Bøving 21'; Biereth 41' (pen.)	Report	Minamino 33' (pen.); Matazo 58'	Stadium: DANA Arena Windischgarsten

31 July 2024 Friendly	Feyenoord	1–3	Monaco	Rotterdam, Netherlands
19:30 CEST (UTC+2)	Ivanušec 39'	Report	Ilenikhena 25'; Maripán 51'; Lemaréchal (yellow card) 56'; Salisu 67'	Stadium: De Kuip; Referee: Allard Lindhout (Netherlands)

12 August 2024 Joan Gamper Trophy	Barcelona	0–3	Monaco	Barcelona, Spain
20:00 CEST (UTC+2)		Report	Camara 50'; Embolo 57'; Mawissa 86'; Salisu (yellow card) 90+4'	Stadium: Estadi Olímpic Lluís Companys; Referee: Victor García Verdura (Spain)

== Competitions ==
=== Overall record ===
Competition	First match	Last match	Starting round	Final position	Record							
Competition	First match	Last match	Starting round	Final position	Pld	W	D	L	GF	GA	GD	Win %
Ligue 1	17 August 2024	17 May 2025	Matchday 1	3rd	34	18	7	9	63	41	+22	52.94
Coupe de France	22 December 2024	14 January 2025	Round of 64	Round of 32	2	1	1	0	5	2	+3	50.00
Trophée des Champions	5 January 2025		Final	Runners-up	1	0	0	1	0	1	−1	0.00
UEFA Champions League	19 September 2024	18 February 2025	League phase	Knockout phase play-offs	10	4	2	4	16	17	−1	40.00
Total					47	23	10	14	84	61	+23	48.94

Source: Soccerway

=== Ligue 1 ===
==== League table ====
Pos	Team	Pld	W	D	L	GF	GA	GD	Pts	Qualification or relegation
1	Paris Saint-Germain (C)	34	26	6	2	92	35	+57	84	Qualification for the Champions League league phase
2	Marseille	34	20	5	9	74	47	+27	65	Qualification for the Champions League league phase
3	Monaco	34	18	7	9	63	41	+22	61	Qualification for the Champions League league phase
4	Nice	34	17	9	8	66	41	+25	60	Qualification for the Champions League third qualifying round
5	Lille	34	17	9	8	52	36	+16	60	Qualification for the Europa League league phase (Note: Since the 2024–25 Coupe de France winners, Paris Saint-Germain, qualified for the Champions League via league position, the Europa League berth awarded to the cup winners was passed to the sixth-placed team and the Conference League berth was passed to the seventh-placed team.)

Source: Ligue 1
Rules for classification: 1) Points; 2) Goal difference; 3) Head-to-head points; 4) Head-to-head goal difference; 5) Head-to-head goals scored; 6) Head-to-head away goals scored; 7) Goals scored; 8) Away goals scored; 9) Fair-play points (Note: Head-to-head record is used only after all the matches between the teams in question have been played).
(C) Champions

==== Results summary ====
Overall								Home						Away					
Pld	W	D	L	GF	GA	GD	Pts	W	D	L	GF	GA	GD	W	D	L	GF	GA	GD
34	18	7	9	63	41	+22	61	12	3	2	38	16	+22	6	4	7	25	25	0

Source: Ligue 1

==== Results by round ====
Round	1	2	3	4	5	6	7	8	9	10	11	12	13	14	15	16	17	18	19	20	21	22	23	24	25	26	27	28	29	30	31	32	33	34
Ground	H	A	H	A	H	H	A	H	A	H	A	H	A	H	A	H	A	A	H	H	A	H	A	H	A	A	H	A	H	H	A	A	H	A
Result	W	W	D	W	W	W	W	D	L	L	W	W	L	W	D	L	D	L	W	W	L	W	L	W	D	W	W	L	W	D	D	W	W	L
Position	7	3	4	3	3	2	1	2	2	3	2	2	3	3	3	3	3	4	3	3	4	4	5	4	4	3	2	3	2	3	4	3	3	3

Source: Ligue 1
A = Away; H = Home; W = Win; D = Draw; L = Loss

==== Matches ====
The match schedule was released on 21 June 2024.

17 August 2024 1	Monaco	1–0	Saint-Étienne	Monaco
21:00 CEST (UTC+2)	Minamino 28'; Embolo (yellow card) 90+5'	Report	N'Zuzi (yellow card) 67'	Stadium: Stade Louis II; Attendance: 14,250; Referee: Clément Turpin

24 August 2024 2	Lyon	0–2	Monaco	Décines-Charpieu
17:00 CEST (UTC+2)	Tolisso (yellow card) 90'; Mata (yellow card) 90+6'	Report	Salisu (yellow card) 44'; Ben Seghir 65'; Camara 80', (yellow card) 90+4' (yellow-red card) 90+7'	Stadium: Parc Olympique Lyonnais; Attendance: 54,392; Referee: Stéphanie Frappart

1 September 2024 3	Monaco	1–1	Lens	Monaco
15:00 CEST (UTC+2)	Vanderson (yellow card) 54'; Zakaria 84'	Report	Gradit (yellow card) 9'; Aguilar (yellow card) 34'; Sotoca (yellow card) 39'; Labeau (yellow card) 68'; Frankowski 90+4' (pen.)	Stadium: Stade Louis II; Attendance: 9,030; Referee: Willy Delajod

14 September 2024 4	Auxerre	0–3	Monaco	Auxerre
19:00 CEST (UTC+2)	Osho (yellow card) 14'; Owusu (yellow card) 43'; Jubal (yellow card) 45+1'	Report	Kehrer 8'; Vanderson 25'; Zakaria 89'	Stadium: Stade de l'Abbé-Deschamps; Attendance: 17,045; Referee: Abdelatif Kherradji

22 September 2024 5	Monaco	3–1	Le Havre	Monaco
15:00 CEST (UTC+2)	Teze 9'; Magassa (yellow card) 21'; Ben Seghir 66'; Balogun 70'	Report	Touré (yellow card) 20'; Kuzyayev 30', (yellow card) 65'; Salmier (yellow card) 44'	Stadium: Stade Louis II; Attendance: 6,353; Referee: Stéphanie Frappart

28 September 2024 6	Monaco	2–1	Montpellier	Monaco
21:00 CEST (UTC+2)	Balogun 32'; Vanderson (yellow card) 50'; Zakaria (yellow card) 50'; Salisu (yellow card) 82'; Camara (yellow card) 88', (goal) 90+8'	Report	Sagnan (yellow card) 4'; Coulibaly (yellow card) 12' (yellow-red card) 90+2'; Nzingoula 16'	Stadium: Stade Louis II; Attendance: 13,065; Referee: Marc Bollengier

5 October 2024 7	Rennes	1–2	Monaco	Rennes
21:00 CEST (UTC+2)	Blas 11', (yellow card) 44'; Assignon (yellow card) 75'	Report	Kehrer 6'; Balogun 22'; Zakaria (yellow card) 45+8'; Ouattara (yellow card) 57'; Minamino (yellow card) 72'; Köhn (yellow card) 86'	Stadium: Roazhon Park; Attendance: 26,533; Referee: Thomas Léonard

18 October 2024 8	Monaco	0–0	Lille	Monaco
20:45 CEST (UTC+2)	Teze (yellow card) 41', (red card) 61'	Report	Bouaddi (yellow card) 11'; Meunier (yellow card) 34'; Alexsandro (yellow card) 44'; Sahraoui (yellow card) 70'; Bayo (yellow card) 90+4'	Stadium: Stade Louis II; Attendance: 7,263; Referee: Eric Wattellier

27 October 2024 9	Nice	2–1	Monaco	Nice
17:00 CET (UTC+1)	Guessand 45+1'; Cho (yellow card) 45+4'; Laborde 71'; Bard (yellow card) 77'	Report	Magassa (yellow card) 15'; Vanderson (yellow card) 35' (yellow-red card) 45+4'; Embolo 39'; Singo (yellow card) 45'; Camara (yellow card) 52'	Stadium: Allianz Riviera; Attendance: 29,795; Referee: Jérémie Pignard

1 November 2024 10	Monaco	0–1	Angers	Monaco
19:00 CET (UTC+1)	Camara (yellow card) 17'	Report	Aholou 29'; Capelle (yellow card) 89'	Stadium: Stade Louis II; Attendance: 10,540; Referee: Abdelatif Kherradji

9 November 2024 11	Strasbourg	1–3	Monaco	Strasbourg
17:00 CET (UTC+1)	Doué (yellow card) 25', (goal) 29'; Petrović (yellow card) 63'; Moreira (yellow card) 78'; Diarra (yellow card) 82'; Wiley (yellow card) 86'	Report	Caio Henrique (yellow card) 22'; Camara (yellow card) 35'; Ben Seghir 79' (pen.), 89'; Ilenikhena 90+1'	Stadium: Stade de la Meinau; Attendance: 19,451; Referee: Bastien Dechepy

22 November 2024 12	Monaco	3–2	Brest	Monaco
19:00 CET (UTC+1)	Akliouche 5', 90+1'; Golovin 24'; Majecki (yellow card) 78'; Singo (yellow card) 85'	Report	Lala (yellow card) 6'; Sima 50'; Le Cardinal (yellow card) 83'; Ajorque 90+6'	Stadium: Stade Louis II; Attendance: 5,721; Referee: Thomas Léonard

1 December 2024 13	Marseille	2–1	Monaco	Marseille
20:45 CET (UTC+1)	Luis Henrique 53'; Greenwood 89' (pen.)	Report	Golovin 41'; Vanderson (yellow card) 90+3'	Stadium: Stade Vélodrome; Attendance: 64,277; Referee: Clément Turpin

7 December 2024 14	Monaco	2–0	Toulouse	Monaco
17:00 CET (UTC+1)	Singo 50'; Embolo (yellow card) 69', (goal) 82'; Teze (yellow card) 90+1'	Report	Aboukhlal (yellow card) 37'; Cásseres (yellow card) 71'	Stadium: Stade Louis II; Attendance: 6,868; Referee: Stéphanie Frappart

14 December 2024 15	Reims	0–0	Monaco	Reims
21:00 CET (UTC+1)	Diouf (yellow card) 84'	Report	Magassa (yellow card) 40'; Ouattara (yellow card) 57'; Golovin (yellow card) 90+4'	Stadium: Stade Auguste Delaune; Attendance: 15,859; Referee: Romain Lissorgue

18 December 2024 16	Monaco	2–4	Paris Saint-Germain	Monaco
21:00 CET (UTC+1)	Singo (yellow card) 13'; Camara (yellow card) 29'; Ben Seghir 53' (pen.); Embolo 60'	Report	Doué 24'; Dembélé 64', 90+7'; Ramos 83'	Stadium: Stade Louis II; Attendance: 12,095; Referee: François Letexier

10 January 2025 17	Nantes	2–2	Monaco	Nantes
19:00 CET (UTC+1)	Abline 12'; Amian 47'; Thomas (yellow card) 53'; Lepenant (yellow card) 87'; Pallois (yellow card) 90+4'	Report	Embolo 52'; Salisu 59'	Stadium: Stade de la Beaujoire; Attendance: 25,380; Referee: Marc Bollengier

17 January 2025 18	Montpellier	2–1	Monaco	Montpellier
19:00 CET (UTC+1)	Al-Taamari 55', 82'; Mouanga (yellow card) 81'	Report	Kehrer 32'; Magassa (yellow card) 56'; Vanderson (yellow card) 67'	Stadium: Stade de la Mosson; Attendance: 11,371; Referee: Jérôme Brisard

25 January 2025 19	Monaco	3–2	Rennes	Monaco
17:00 CET (UTC+1)	Akliouche 15', (yellow card) 90+4'; Biereth 52'; Golovin 56'; Mawissa (yellow card) 63'; Minamino (yellow card) 73'	Report	Nagida 45+1'; Gouiri 67', (yellow card) 75'; Wooh (yellow card) 70'; Hateboer (yellow card) 87'	Stadium: Stade Louis II; Attendance: 5,725; Referee: Jérémy Stinat

1 February 2025 20	Monaco	4–2	Auxerre	Monaco
19:00 CET (UTC+1)	Kehrer 35'; Zakaria (yellow card) 45+4'; Biereth 57', 63', 65'; Magassa (yellow card) 82'	Report	Joly (yellow card) 30'; Diomandé 38'; Jubal 45+7' (pen.); Owusu (yellow card) 71'	Stadium: Stade Louis II; Attendance: 5,336; Referee: Abdelatif Kherradji

7 February 2025 21	Paris Saint-Germain	4–1	Monaco	Paris
21:05 CET (UTC+1)	Vitinha 6'; Doué (yellow card) 28'; Kvaratskhelia 54'; Dembélé 57', 90'	Report	Zakaria 17'	Stadium: Parc des Princes; Attendance: 47,926; Referee: Clément Turpin

15 February 2025 22	Monaco	7–1	Nantes	Monaco
19:00 CET (UTC+1)	Biereth 44', 54', 64' (pen.); Minamino 45'; Ben Seghir 49'; Ilenikhena 81', 90+5'; Zakaria (yellow card) 85'	Report	Abline 4', (yellow card) 45'; Cozza (red card) 8'	Stadium: Stade Louis II; Attendance: 6,080; Referee: Thomas Léonard

22 February 2025 23	Lille	2–1	Monaco	Villeneuve-d'Ascq
17:00 CET (UTC+1)	Haraldsson 22', 42'; David (yellow card) 73'; André (yellow card) 73'; Fernandez-Pardo (yellow card) 89'; Alexsandro (yellow card) 90+2'	Report	Zakaria (yellow card) 19'; Minamino 45+1'; Diatta (yellow card) 58'	Stadium: Stade Pierre-Mauroy; Attendance: 44,177; Referee: Benoît Bastien

28 February 2025 24	Monaco	3–0	Reims	Monaco
20:45 CET (UTC+1)	Biereth 34', 39', 51'	Report		Stadium: Stade Louis II; Attendance: 5,517; Referee: Eric Wattellier

7 March 2025 25	Toulouse	1–1	Monaco	Toulouse
20:45 CET (UTC+1)	Cresswell (yellow card) 45+1'; Magri 90+1'	Report	Mawissa (yellow card) 1'; Minamino 17'; Embolo (yellow card) 74'; Akliouche (yellow card) 90'	Stadium: Stadium de Toulouse; Attendance: 25,593; Referee: Marc Bollengier

15 March 2025 26	Angers	0–2	Monaco	Angers
19:00 CET (UTC+1)	Abdelli (yellow card) 52'	Report	Caio Henrique (yellow card) 43'; Minamino (yellow card) 68'; Biereth 77'; Akliouche 88' (pen.)	Stadium: Stade Raymond Kopa; Attendance: 11,116; Referee: Willy Delajod

29 March 2025 27	Monaco	2–1	Nice	Monaco
21:00 CET (UTC+1)	Biereth (penalty missed) 5', 55'; Embolo (yellow card) 27', (goal) 73'; Mawissa (yellow card) 51'	Report	Boga 41'; Clauss (yellow card) 45'; Santamaria (yellow card) 72'; Laborde (yellow card) 87'; Boudaoui (yellow card) 87'; Dante (red card) 90+1'	Stadium: Stade Louis II; Attendance: 11,564; Referee: Jérôme Brisard

5 April 2025 28	Brest	2–1	Monaco	Brest
19:00 CEST (UTC+2)	Chardonnet (yellow card) 30'; Sima 42'; Camara (yellow card) 44', (goal) 90+4'; Lala (yellow card) 65'	Report	Embolo (yellow card) 17'; Zakaria 63' (pen.); Camara (yellow card) 64'; Biereth (yellow card) 90+5'	Stadium: Stade Francis-Le Blé; Attendance: 14,713; Referee: Thomas Léonard

12 April 2025 29	Monaco	3–0	Marseille	Monaco
17:00 CEST (UTC+2)	Singo (yellow card) 9'; Minamino 34'; Embolo 58'; Kehrer (yellow card) 78'; Zakaria 82' (pen.)	Report	Harit (yellow card) 87'	Stadium: Stade Louis II; Attendance: 13,232; Referee: Benoît Bastien

19 April 2025 30	Monaco	0–0	Strasbourg	Monaco
19:00 CEST (UTC+2)	Caio Henrique (yellow card) 12'; Camara (yellow card) 38'; Minamino (yellow card) 69'	Report	Doukouré (yellow card) 13'; Doué (yellow card) 24'; Omobamidele (yellow card) 48'	Stadium: Stade Louis II; Attendance: 12,825; Referee: Eric Wattellier

26 April 2025 31	Le Havre	1–1	Monaco	Le Havre
19:00 CEST (UTC+2)	Hassan 22', (yellow card) 23'	Report	Biereth 61'	Stadium: Stade Océane; Attendance: 21,340; Referee: Clément Turpin

3 May 2025 32	Saint-Étienne	1–3	Monaco	Stade Geoffroy-Guichard
21:05 CEST (UTC+2)	Davitashvili 65'	Report	Akliouche 2'; Al-Musrati 68'; Balogun 78'	Stadium: Saint-Étienne; Attendance: 37,757; Referee: Jérôme Brisard

10 May 2025 33	Monaco	2–0	Lyon	Monaco
21:00 CEST (UTC+2)	Camara (yellow card) 59'; Minamino 62'; Zakaria 68'; Diatta (yellow card) 88'	Report	Mata (yellow card) 9'; Almada (yellow card) 45+2'; Tagliafico (yellow card) 90'; Niakhaté (yellow card) 90+2'	Stadium: Stade Louis II; Attendance: 13,578; Referee: Benoît Bastien

17 May 2025 34	Lens	4–0	Monaco	Lens
21:00 CEST (UTC+2)	El Aynaoui 21', 56'; Medina (yellow card) 43'; Thomasson 73'; Zaroury 78'	Report	Diatta (yellow card) 45+1'; Magassa (red card) 52'	Stadium: Stade Bollaert-Delelis; Attendance: 38,160; Referee: François Letexier

=== Coupe de France ===
22 December 2024 Round of 64	L'Union Saint-Jean	1–4	Monaco	Toulouse
14:45 CET (UTC+1)	Tournier (yellow card) 70', (goal) 82'	Report	Ben Seghir 21'; Vanderson 37'; Minamino (yellow card) 45+3', (penalty missed) 58'; Embolo (penalty missed) 45+4'; Teze 65'; Ilenikhena (yellow card) 73', (goal) 90'	Stadium: Stadium de Toulouse; Attendance: 20,577; Referee: Olivier Thual

14 January 2025 Round of 32	Reims	1–1 (3–1 p)	Monaco	Reims
20:45 CET (UTC+1)	Kipré 45'; Diakité (yellow card) 86'	Report	Salisu 70'; Embolo (yellow card) 83'	Stadium: Stade Auguste-Delaune; Attendance: 10,665; Referee: Gaël Angoula
	Penalties
	Nakamura (penalty scored); Salama (penalty scored); Kipré (penalty missed); Diakité (penalty scored)		(penalty missed) Caio Henrique; (penalty missed) Biereth; (penalty missed) Camara; (penalty scored) Embolo

=== Trophée des Champions ===
5 January 2025 Final	Paris Saint-Germain	1–0	Monaco	Doha, Qatar
19:30 AST (UTC+3)	Mendes (yellow card) 23'; Barcola (yellow card) 87'; Dembélé 90+2'	Report	Vanderson (yellow card) 35'	Stadium: Stadium 974; Attendance: 39,682; Referee: Willy Delajod

=== UEFA Champions League ===
==== League phase ====
The draw for the league phase was held on 29 August 2024.

Pos	Team	Pld	W	D	L	GF	GA	GD	Pts	Qualification
15	(French Football Federation) Paris Saint-Germain	8	4	1	3	14	9	+5	13	Advance to knockout phase play-offs (seeded)
16	(Portuguese Football Federation) Benfica	8	4	1	3	16	12	+4	13	Advance to knockout phase play-offs (seeded)
17	(French Football Federation) Monaco	8	4	1	3	13	13	0	13	Advance to knockout phase play-offs (unseeded)
18	(French Football Federation) Brest	8	4	1	3	10	11	−1	13	Advance to knockout phase play-offs (unseeded)
19	(Royal Dutch Football Association) Feyenoord	8	4	1	3	18	21	−3	13	Advance to knockout phase play-offs (unseeded)

Source: UEFA
Rules for classification: League phase tiebreakers

Round	1	2	3	4	5	6	7	8
Ground	H	A	H	A	H	A	H	A
Result	W	D	W	W	L	L	W	L
Position	12	14	4	3	8	16	10	17
Points	3	4	7	10	10	10	13	13

Source: UEFA
A = Away; H = Home; W = Win; D = Draw; L = Loss

19 September 2024 1	Monaco (France)	2–1	(Spain) Barcelona	Monaco
21:00 CEST (UTC+2)	Akliouche 16'; Ben Seghir (yellow card) 30'; Camara (yellow card) 36'; Ilenikhena 71'; Zakaria (yellow card) 90+2'; Balogun (yellow card) 90+6'	Report	García (red card) 11'; Yamal 28'; Martínez (yellow card) 75'; Balde (yellow card) 85'; Casadó (yellow card) 85'; Raphinha (yellow card) 85'	Stadium: Stade Louis II; Attendance: 13,296; Referee: Allard Lindhout (Netherlands)

2 October 2024 2	Dinamo Zagreb (Croatia)	2–2	(France) Monaco	Zagreb, Croatia
21:00 CEST (UTC+2)	Petković (yellow card) 26'; Ademi (yellow card) 38'; Sučić 45+3'; Baturina (yellow card) 42', (goal) 66'; Kačavenda (yellow card) 81'; Ristovski (yellow card) 90'	Report	Salisu (yellow card) 22', (goal) 74'; Embolo (yellow card) 28'; Zakaria 90' (pen.)	Stadium: Stadion Maksimir; Attendance: 12,462; Referee: Harm Osmers (Germany)

22 October 2024 3	Monaco (France)	5–1	(Serbia) Red Star Belgrade	Monaco
18:45 CEST (UTC+2)	Minamino 20', 70'; Kehrer (yellow card) 26'; Embolo 45+4'; Singo 54'; Akliouche 90+7'	Report	Ndiaye 27' (pen.); Maksimović (yellow card) 45+2'	Stadium: Stade Louis II; Attendance: 9,590; Referee: Tobias Stieler (Germany)

5 November 2024 4	Bologna (Italy)	0–1	(France) Monaco	Bologna, Italy
21:00 CET (UTC+1)	Moro (yellow card) 27'; Fabbian (yellow card) 53'; Lucumí (yellow card) 88'	Report	Camara (yellow card) 75'; Mawissa (yellow card) 77'; Kehrer 86'	Stadium: Stadio Renato Dall'Ara; Attendance: 23,084; Referee: Aliyar Aghayev (Azerbaijan)

27 November 2024 5	Monaco (France)	2–3	(Portugal) Benfica	Monaco
21:00 CET (UTC+1)	Ben Seghir 13'; Zakaria (yellow card) 41'; Kehrer (yellow card) 41'; Singo (yellow card) 42' (yellow-red card) 58'; Magassa 67'; Mawissa (yellow card) 79'	Report	Florentino (yellow card) 6'; Carreras (yellow card) 29'; Aktürkoğlu (yellow card) 42'; Pavlidis 48'; Cabral 84'; Amdouni 88'	Stadium: Stade Louis II; Attendance: 13,581; Referee: Rade Obrenovič (Slovenia)

11 December 2024 6	Arsenal (England)	3–0	(France) Monaco	London, England
20:00 GMT (UTC±0)	Martinelli (yellow card) 32'; Saka 34', 78'; Merino (yellow card) 60'; Havertz 88'	Report	Vanderson (yellow card) 63'	Stadium: Emirates Stadium; Attendance: 60,157; Referee: Davide Massa (Italy)

21 January 2025 7	Monaco (France)	1–0	(England) Aston Villa	Monaco
21:00 CET (UTC+1)	Singo 8'; Golovin (yellow card) 90+2'	Report	Digne (yellow card) 49'; Rogers (yellow card) 82'; Kamara (yellow card) 90+2'	Stadium: Stade Louis II; Attendance: 13,508; Referee: Slavko Vinčić (Slovenia)

29 January 2025 8	Inter Milan (Italy)	3–0	(France) Monaco	Milan, Italy
21:00 CET (UTC+1)	L. Martínez 4' (pen.), 16', 67'; Pavard (yellow card) 66'; Asllani (yellow card) 81'	Report	Zakaria (yellow card) 3'; Mawissa (red card) 12'; Vanderson (yellow card) 45+3'	Stadium: San Siro; Attendance: 71,601; Referee: Irfan Peljto (Bosnia and Herzegovina)

==== Knockout phase ====
===== Knockout phase play-offs =====
The draw for the knockout phase play-offs was held on 31 January 2025.

12 February 2025 First leg	Monaco (France)	0–1	(Portugal) Benfica	Monaco
21:00 CET (UTC+1)	Al-Musrati (yellow card) 41' (yellow-red card) 52'; Vanderson (yellow card) 79'; Zakaria (yellow card) 90+1'	Report	Carreras (yellow card) 16'; Pavlidis 48'; Florentino (yellow card) 56'	Stadium: Stade Louis II; Attendance: 12,159; Referee: Maurizio Mariani (Italy)

18 February 2025 Second leg	Benfica (Portugal)	3–3 (4–3 agg.)	(France) Monaco	Lisbon, Portugal
20:00 WET (UTC±0)	Aktürkoğlu 22'; Barreiro (yellow card) 67'; Amdouni (yellow card) 71'; Pavlidis 76' (pen.); Kökçü 84'	Report	Minamino 32'; Ben Seghir 51'; Akliouche (yellow card) 62'; Ilenikhena 81'	Stadium: Estádio da Luz; Attendance: 60,776; Referee: Glenn Nyberg (Sweden)

== Statistics ==
=== Appearances and goals ===
No.	Pos	Nat	Player	Total		Ligue 1		Coupe de France		Trophée des Champions		UEFA Champions League	
No.	Pos	Nat	Player	Apps	Goals	Apps	Goals	Apps	Goals	Apps	Goals	Apps	Goals
Goalkeepers
1	GK	(Poland) POL	Radosław Majecki	23	0	15	0	0	0	0	0	8	0
16	GK	(Switzerland) SUI	Philipp Köhn	23	0	19	0	1	0	1	0	2	0
50	GK	(France) FRA	Yann Lienard	1	0	0	0	1	0	0	0	0	0
Defenders
2	DF	(Brazil) BRA	Vanderson	41	2	23+6	1	2	1	1	0	9	0
4	DF	(Netherlands) NED	Jordan Teze	22	2	8+8	1	1+1	1	0+1	0	0+3	0
5	DF	(Germany) GER	Thilo Kehrer	40	5	27	4	1+1	0	1	0	10	1
12	DF	(Brazil) BRA	Caio Henrique	38	0	21+6	0	1+1	0	1	0	5+3	0
13	DF	(France) FRA	Christian Mawissa	28	1	17+5	0	0	0	0	0	4+2	1
17	DF	(Ivory Coast) CIV	Wilfried Singo	35	3	23+4	1	2	0	0	0	6	2
20	DF	(France) FRA	Kassoum Ouattara	16	0	5+7	0	1+1	0	0	0	0+2	0
22	DF	(Ghana) GHA	Mohammed Salisu	25	3	12+4	1	1+1	1	1	0	5+1	1
34	DF	(France) FRA	Chrislain Matsima	0	0	0	0	0	0	0	0	0	0
88	DF	(France) FRA	Soungoutou Magassa	30	0	12+8	0	2	0	0+1	0	2+5	0
Midfielders
6	MF	(Switzerland) SUI	Denis Zakaria	34	7	24+2	6	0	0	1	0	7	1
7	MF	(Morocco) MAR	Eliesse Ben Seghir	46	9	19+14	6	2	1	1	0	7+3	2
8	MF	(Libya) LBA	Al-Musrati	11	1	3+7	1	0	0	0	0	1	0
10	MF	(Russia) RUS	Aleksandr Golovin	29	3	13+6	3	0	0	1	0	6+3	0
11	MF	(France) FRA	Maghnes Akliouche	43	7	27+5	5	0	0	1	0	10	2
15	MF	(Senegal) SEN	Lamine Camara	40	2	25+4	2	1	0	0+1	0	9	0
28	MF	(France) FRA	Mamadou Coulibaly	1	0	0+1	0	0	0	0	0	0	0
37	MF	(France) FRA	Edan Diop	0	0	0	0	0	0	0	0	0	0
41	MF	(France) FRA	Lucas Michal	13	0	0+8	0	1+1	0	0	0	0+3	0
42	MF	(France) FRA	Saïmon Bouabré	4	0	1+2	0	0+1	0	0	0	0	0
Forwards
9	FW	(United States) USA	Folarin Balogun	16	4	7+6	4	0	0	0	0	0+3	0
14	FW	(Denmark) DEN	Mika Biereth	19	13	16	13	0+1	0	0	0	1+1	0
18	FW	(Japan) JPN	Takumi Minamino	43	9	27+4	6	2	0	1	0	6+3	3
21	FW	(France) FRA	George Ilenikhena	31	6	6+17	3	0+1	1	1	0	0+6	2
27	FW	(Senegal) SEN	Krépin Diatta	23	0	2+16	0	0+1	0	0	0	2+2	0
36	FW	(Switzerland) SUI	Breel Embolo	42	7	19+10	6	2	0	0+1	0	10	1
Players transferred/loaned out during the season
8	MF	(Belgium) BEL	Eliot Matazo	7	0	1+2	0	1	0	0	0	0+3	0
14	DF	(Senegal) SEN	Ismail Jakobs	2	0	2	0	0	0	0	0	0	0

Source: Competitions
