= Tylel Tati =

French footballer (born 2008)

Personal information
- Date of birth: 19 January 2008 (age 18)
- Place of birth: Champigny-sur-Marne, France
- Height: 1.90 m (6 ft 3 in)
- Position: Centre-back

Team information
- Current team: Nantes
- Number: 78

Youth career
- 2013–2023: US Roissy-en-Brie
- 2023–2025: Nantes

Senior career*
Years	Team	Apps	(Gls)
2025–	Nantes B	2	(0)
2025–	Nantes	20	(0)

International career^{‡}
2024	France U16	2	(0)
2024	France U17	2	(0)
- * Club domestic league appearances and goals as of 19:13, 5 April 2026 (UTC) ‡ National team caps and goals as of 19:11, 24 August 2025 (UTC)

Tylel Tati (born 19 January 2008) is a French professional footballer who plays as a centre-back for Ligue 2 club Nantes.

== Club career ==
Tati grew up playing for US Roissy-en-Brie, later joining the INF Clairefontaine academy before his arrival at Nantes. He made his debut with Nantes's reserve team at the end of the 2024–25 season before joining the club's first team ahead of the 2025–26 preseason. On 17 August 2025, he made his professional debut as a starter in the first match of the Ligue 1 season against champions Paris Saint-Germain, an eventual 1–0 defeat. His performance was praised by Nantes manager Luis Castro, who said that Tati had "a very good game", while newspaper Ouest-France described his debut as "successful" and "promising for the future".

== International career ==
Tati is a France youth international, making his debut for the France under-16s in 2024.

== Personal life ==
Born in France, Tati is of Congolese descent from the Republic of the Congo on his father's side and Senegalese descent on his mother's side.

Tati’s father, Sambou "Bijou" Tati, has served as the president of US Roissy-en-Brie, the club where Tati began his youth career. Sambou also coached Paul Pogba during Pogba’s final year at the club, when he was 13. Born in 2008, Tati has been photographed alongside Pogba since the age of five, both at US Roissy-en-Brie and later at the INF Clairefontaine academy.

== Career statistics ==
As of match played 5 April 2026

Appearances and goals by club, season and competition
Club	Season	League			National cup		Europe		Other		Total	
Club	Season	Division	Apps	Goals	Apps	Goals	Apps	Goals	Apps	Goals	Apps	Goals
Nantes B	2024–25	National 3	2	0	—		—		—		2	0
Nantes	2025–26	Ligue 1	20	0	2	0	—		—		22	0
Career total			22	0	2	0	0	0	0	0	24	0
