= Mohammed Salisu =

Ghanaian footballer (born 1999)

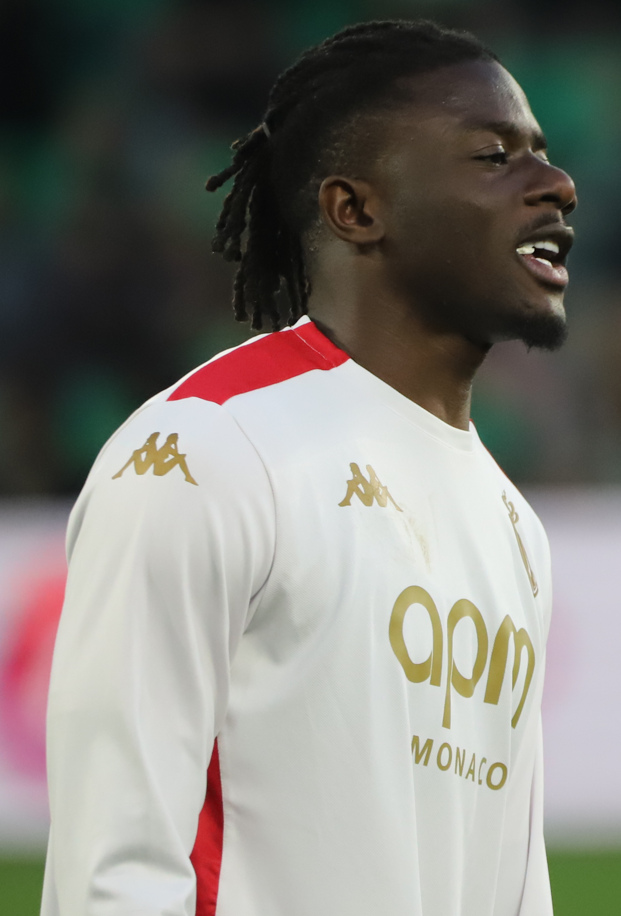
- Salisu with Monaco in 2025

Personal information
- Full name: Mohammed Salisu Abdul Karim
- Date of birth: 17 April 1999 (age 27)
- Place of birth: Kumasi, Ghana
- Height: 1.91 m (6 ft 3 in)
- Position: Centre-back

Team information
- Current team: Monaco
- Number: 22

Youth career
- 2012–2013: Kumasi Barcelona Babies
- 2013–2017: WAFA
- 2017: African Talent Football Academy
- 2017: Valladolid

Senior career*
Years	Team	Apps	(Gls)
2018–2019	Valladolid B	39	(1)
2019–2020	Valladolid	31	(1)
2020–2023	Southampton	68	(0)
2023–	Monaco	41	(2)

International career^{‡}
2022–	Ghana	22	(4)
- * Club domestic league appearances and goals as of 19:14, 18 October 2026 (UTC) ‡ National team caps and goals as of 8 October 2025

Mohammed Salisu Abdul Karim (born 17 April 1999) is a Ghanaian professional footballer who plays as a centre-back for Ligue 1 club Monaco and the Ghana national team.

Salisu started his senior career with Valladolid, featuring for the reserve side before making his first team debut in 2019. He made 34 appearances for the club before joining Southampton for a £10.9 million fee in 2020. Salisu joined Monaco in August 2023.

== Club career ==
=== Early career ===
Born in Kumasi, Salisu started his career at his local youth club Kumasi Barcelona Babies before joining West African Football Academy in 2013. He left the latter for personal reasons in 2015, and then remained over a year without a club before impressing on a trial at the newly formed Nsawam branch of the African Talent Football Academy in March 2017. In October 2017, he joined Real Valladolid's youth setup.

=== Valladolid ===
==== 2017–18 season ====
Salisu made his senior debut with the reserves on 28 January 2018, starting in a 4–2 Segunda División B home loss against Coruxo. On 1 March, he extended his contract until 2021. He scored his first senior goal on 29 April, netting the equaliser in the 82nd minute of a 2–2 away draw against Racing Ferrol.

==== 2018–19 season ====
On 16 July 2018, Salisu was promoted to the senior Valladolid squad. He made his professional debut on 9 January 2019, starting in a 1–0 away loss against Getafe in that season's Copa del Rey. On 22 May 2019, Salisu extended his contract to keep him at the club until 2022.

==== 2019–20 season ====
He made his La Liga debut on 18 August, starting in a 2–1 away victory over Real Betis. After the departure of Fernando Calero to Espanyol, Salisu became a starter for the Castile and León side, partnering Kiko Olivas. On 26 October 2019, he scored his first professional goal by netting the second goal of a 2–0 home win against Eibar.

=== Southampton ===
==== 2020–21 season ====
On 12 August 2020, Salisu joined Premier League club Southampton for a fee worth £10.9 million. The English club had triggered a buyout clause in the defender's contract with Salisu putting pen to paper on a four-year deal. Manager Ralph Hasenhüttl hailed his new signing, saying he was a future prospect who had all the qualities to come to the Premier League and help Southampton.

Mohammed is a player who fits our profile well. He is young and has a great amount of potential, but he is also someone who has the qualities to come in and help the team as soon as he is up to speed with our way of playing.

— Ralph Hasenhüttl hailing Salisu after signing him from Valladolid.

Salisu had yet to feature for Southampton three months after he had signed with Hasenhüttl providing an update in November 2020, stating: ''There is still a way to go I think for being match fit, but I am very happy he's here. He's a long-term project and I am sure that he will play a lot of games for us.''

Salisu made his Southampton debut on 11 February 2021, six months after signing for the club, playing the full 90 minutes and keeping a clean sheet in a 2–0 FA Cup away victory over Wolverhampton Wanderers as Danny Ings and Stuart Armstrong scored a goal each to send Southampton through to the quarter-finals of the competition. He made his Premier League debut three days later when he came on in the 72nd minute to replace the injured Kyle Walker-Peters, also against Wolverhampton Wanderers ending with a 2–1 loss at home. Salisu made his first Premier League start the following week in a 1–1 draw with Chelsea, putting in an impressive performance.

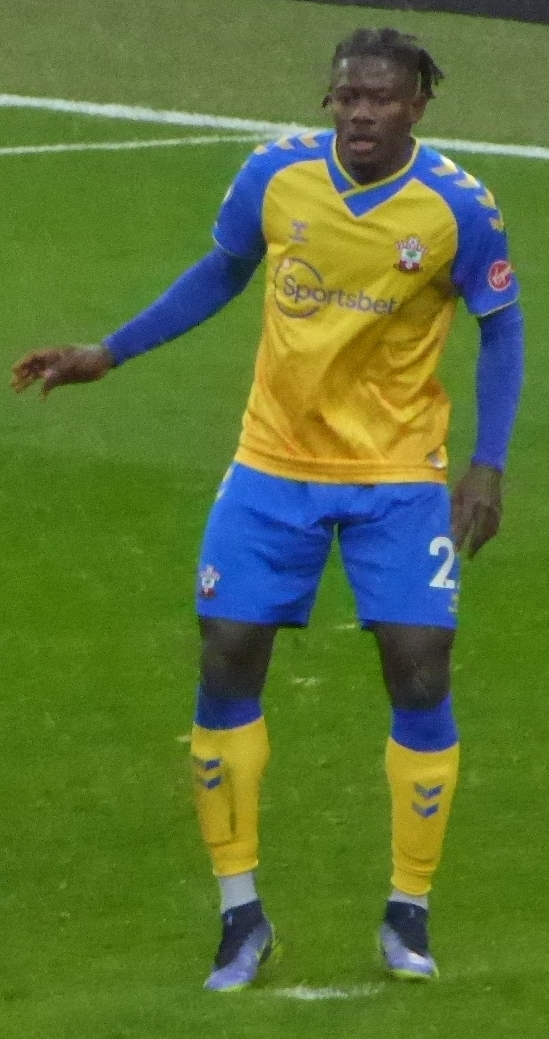
Salisu playing for Southampton in 2022

==== 2021–22 season ====
On 21 September 2021, Salisu scored his first professional goal for Southampton against Sheffield United in the EFL Cup which ended 2–2 at full time before Southampton advanced 4–2 on penalties. On 28 December 2021, Salisu gave away a penalty and got a red card after receiving his second booking for a foul on Son Heung-Min, with the game against Tottenham Hotspur ending in a 1–1 draw.

==== 2022–23 season ====
Salisu made his first appearance of the season on 6 August 2022 in a 4–1 defeat to Tottenham Hotspur. Manager Rubén Sellés revealed in April 2023 that a recurring hip abductor injury was the reason for his continued absence throughout the season.

=== Monaco ===
On 1 August 2023, Salisu joined Ligue 1 club Monaco on a five-year contract until July 2028.

== International career ==
In November 2019, Salisu received his first call-up to the Ghana national team, after being named by James Kwesi Appiah in the squad for the 2021 Africa Cup of Nations qualifiers against South Africa and São Tomé and Príncipe. He withdrew from the squad citing injury problems. In 2020, after Charles Akonnor was appointed as manager of the national team, according to media speculation he made attempts to reach him but his efforts proved futile as seemed Salisu was not interested in playing for the team. His family later came out with a statement to refute all the information within the public space that suggested his refusal to play for the national team. The statement read that '' We further wish to state unequivocally that our son is a proud Ghanaian and very ready to represent Ghana at every level and time''. His elder brother later granted an interview on local radio station Angel FM talking about his brother's call up snub into the Black Starlets, the Ghana U-17 team whilst he was playing in Ghana, due his inability to pay to be in the team and not because his performance was substandard.

In April 2021, during an interview with MozzartSport Kenya, Salisu stated that he would be proud to play for the national team, but also that he felt like it was not the right time for him to play, as he wanted to focus on his club career, instead. In July 2022, the president of the Ghana FA, Kurt Okraku, officially announced that Salisu had finally agreed to represent the Black Stars.

Salisu made his debut for Ghana on 23 September 2022, as a second-half substitute in a 3–0 friendly defeat against Brazil. He scored his first goal for the Black Stars in a 2–0 friendly win against Switzerland on 17 November.

On 14 November 2022, Salisu was named in Ghana's final squad for the 2022 FIFA World Cup in Qatar. He started in central defence in all three of the team's matches and scored the opening goal of the team's 3–2 win over South Korea.

On 1 January 2024, he was named in the Ghanaian squad for the 2023 Africa Cup of Nations. He has been in the starting line-up for both of Ghana's matches thus far: a 2–1 loss to Cape Verde and a 2–2 draw with Egypt.

== Career statistics ==
=== Club ===
As of match played 18 October 2026

Appearances and goals by club, season and competition
Club	Season	League			National cup (Note: Includes Copa del Rey, FA Cup, Coupe de France)		League cup (Note: Includes EFL Cup)		Europe		Other		Total	
Club	Season	Division	Apps	Goals	Apps	Goals	Apps	Goals	Apps	Goals	Apps	Goals	Apps	Goals
Valladolid B	2017–18	Segunda División B	13	1	—		—		—		—		13	1
Valladolid B	2018–19	Segunda División B	26	0	—		—		—		—		26	0
Valladolid B	Total		39	1	—		—		—		—		39	1
Valladolid	2018–19	La Liga	0	0	2	0	—		—		—		2	0
Valladolid	2019–20	La Liga	31	1	1	0	—		—		—		32	1
Valladolid	Total		31	1	3	0	—		—		—		34	1
Southampton	2020–21	Premier League	12	0	3	0	0	0	—		—		15	0
Southampton	2021–22	Premier League	34	0	1	0	2	1	—		—		37	1
Southampton	2022–23	Premier League	22	0	1	0	5	0	—		—		28	0
Southampton	Total		68	0	5	0	7	1	—		—		80	1
Monaco	2023–24	Ligue 1	12	0	1	0	—		—		—		13	0
Monaco	2024–25	Ligue 1	15	1	2	1	—		6 (Note: Appearances in UEFA Champions League)	1	1 (Note: Appearance in Trophée des Champions)	0	23	3
Monaco	2025–26	Ligue 1	12	1	1	0	—		5	0	—		18	1
Monaco	2026–27	Ligue 1	2	0	0	0	—		1 (Note: Appearances in UEFA Conference League)	0	—		3	0
Monaco	Total		41	2	4	1	—		12	1	1	0	58	4
Career total			179	4	12	1	7	1	12	1	1	0	211	7

=== International ===
As of match played 8 October 2025

Appearances and goals by national team and year
National team	Year	Apps	Goals
Ghana	2022	6	2
Ghana	2024	11	0
Ghana	2025	5	2
Total		22	4

As of match played 8 October 2025. Ghana score listed first, score column indicates score after each Salisu goal.

List of international goals scored by Mohammed Salisu
No.	Date	Venue	Cap	Opponent	Score	Result	Competition	Ref.
1	17 November 2022	Zayed Sports City Stadium, Abu Dhabi, United Arab Emirates	3	Switzerland	1–0	2–0	Friendly	
2	28 November 2022	Education City Stadium, Al Rayyan, Qatar	5	South Korea	1–0	3–2	2022 FIFA World Cup	
3	21 March 2025	Accra Sports Stadium, Accra, Ghana	18	Chad	4–0	5–0	2026 FIFA World Cup qualification	
4	8 October 2025	Ben M'Hamed El Abdi Stadium, El Jadida, Morocco	22	Central African Republic	1–0	5–0	2026 FIFA World Cup qualification	
