= Maghnes Akliouche =

French footballer (born 2002)

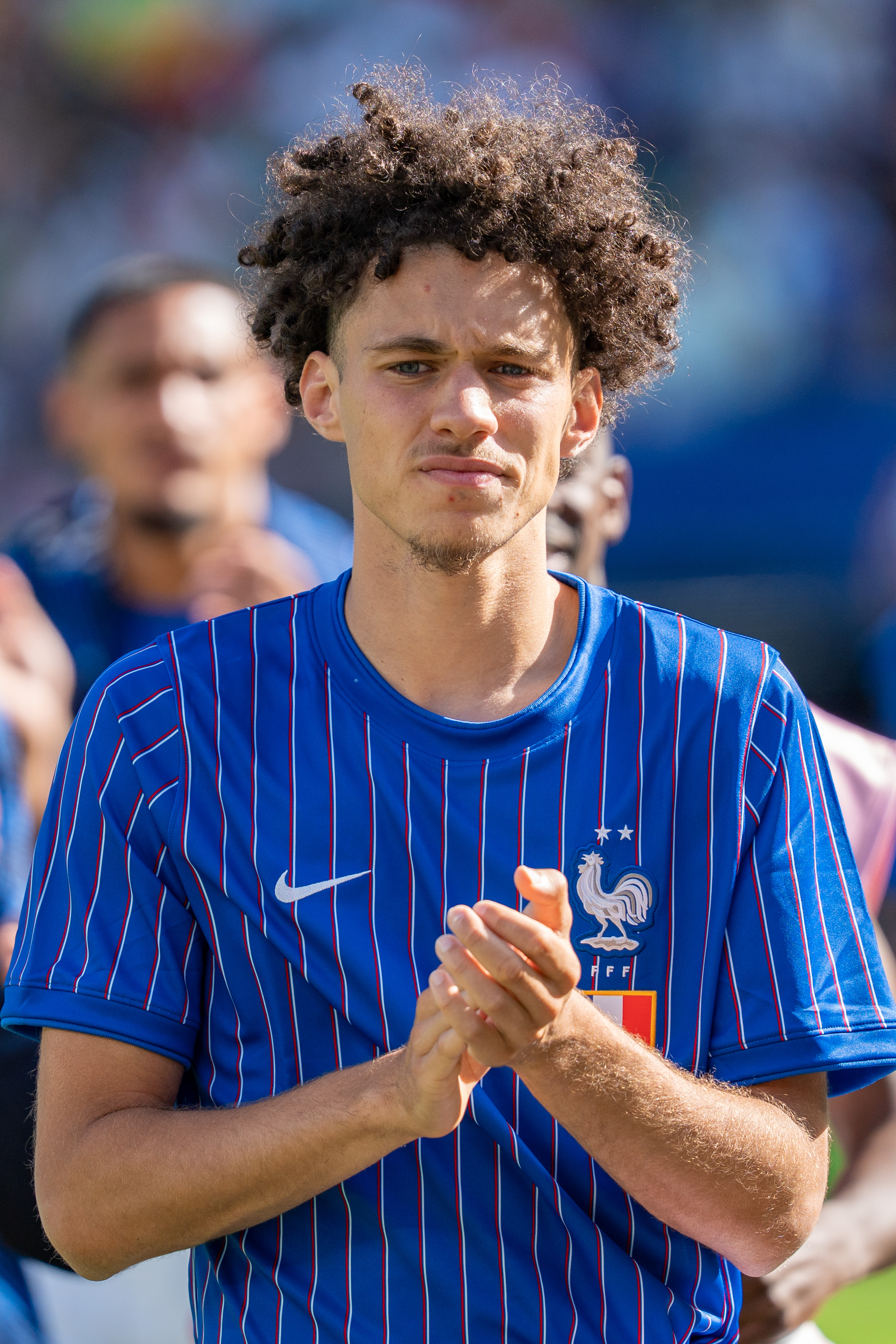
- Akliouche with France in 2026

Personal information
- Full name: Maghnes Akliouche
- Date of birth: 25 February 2002 (age 24)
- Place of birth: Tremblay-en-France, Seine-Saint-Denis, France
- Height: 1.83 m (6 ft 0 in)
- Positions: Attacking midfielder; right winger

Team information
- Current team: Paris Saint-Germain
- Number: 11

Youth career
- 2008–2014: Villemomble
- 2014–2017: Torcy
- 2017–2021: Monaco

Senior career*
Years	Team	Apps	(Gls)
2020–2022	Monaco B	17	(3)
2021–2026	Monaco	109	(18)
2026–	Paris Saint-Germain	10	(1)

International career^{‡}
2022	France U20	7	(3)
2023–2025	France U21	12	(3)
2024	France Olympic	10	(2)
2025–	France	12	(1)
Medal record
Men's football
Representing France
Olympic Games
Silver medal – second place	2024	Team
- * Club domestic league appearances and goals as of 21 November 2026 ‡ National team caps and goals as of 6 October 2026

Maghnes Akliouche (born 25 February 2002) is a French professional footballer who plays as an attacking midfielder or right winger for Ligue 1 club Paris Saint-Germain and the France national team.

== Club career ==
=== Monaco ===
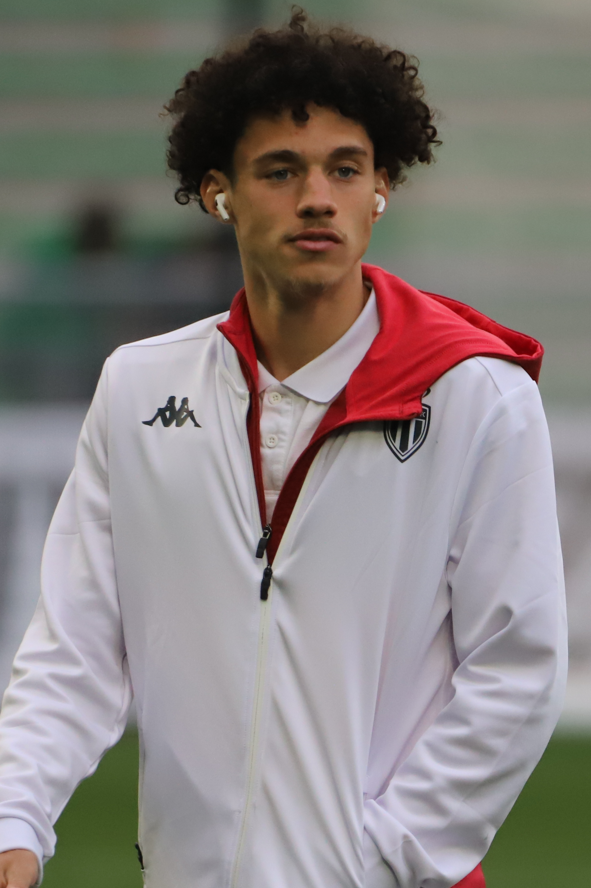
Akliouche with Monaco in 2025

Akliouche made his professional debut for Monaco on 16 October 2021, coming on as a substitute in a 2–0 loss away against Lyon. On 7 January 2023, he scored his first senior goal against Rodez AF during the Coupe de France. Later that year, on 13 August, he netted his first Ligue 1 goal in a 4–2 away win over Clermont.

On 19 September 2024, Akliouche made his UEFA Champions League debut, scoring a goal in a 2–1 win over Barcelona.

=== Paris Saint-Germain ===
On 6 August 2026, Akliouche moved to fellow Ligue 1 club Paris Saint-Germain on a contract until 2031. The transfer fee was reportedly €50m. A week later, on 12 August, he made his debut in a 2–1 victory over Aston Villa in the 2026 UEFA Super Cup.

== International career ==
Born in France, Akliouche is of Algerian descent and holds both French and Algerian nationalities. He was a member of the France Olympic squad that won the silver medal on home soil in 2024.

He received his first call-up to the France senior team in August 2025, ahead of their 2026 FIFA World Cup qualifiers against Ukraine and Iceland. On 5 September 2025, he made his first senior international appearance, coming off the bench against Ukraine in the 2026 FIFA World Cup qualification. Later that year, on 16 November, he scored his first international goal in a 3–1 away win over Azerbaijan during the same World Cup qualification.

On 14 May 2026, Akliouche was selected in the 26-man squad for the 2026 FIFA World Cup. A month later, on 23 June, he was substituted on to make his World Cup debut against Iraq.

== Career statistics ==
=== Club ===
As of match played 21 November 2026

Appearances and goals by club, season and competition
Club	Season	League			Coupe de France		Europe		Other		Total	
Club	Season	Division	Apps	Goals	Apps	Goals	Apps	Goals	Apps	Goals	Apps	Goals
Monaco B	2020–21	National 2	6	0	—		—		—		6	0
Monaco B	2021–22	National 2	11	3	—		—		—		11	3
Monaco B	Total		17	3	—		—		—		17	3
Monaco	2021–22	Ligue 1	7	0	2	0	0	0	—		9	0
Monaco	2022–23	Ligue 1	11	0	1	1	1 (Note: Appearance in UEFA Europa League)	0	—		13	1
Monaco	2023–24	Ligue 1	28	7	3	1	—		—		31	8
Monaco	2024–25	Ligue 1	32	5	0	0	10 (Note: Appearances in UEFA Champions League)	2	1 (Note: Appearance in Trophée des Champions)	0	43	7
Monaco	2025–26	Ligue 1	31	6	2	0	10	1	—		43	7
Monaco	Total		109	18	8	2	21	3	1	0	139	23
Paris Saint-Germain	2026–27	Ligue 1	10	1	0	0	4	1	2 (Note: One appearance in UEFA Super Cup, one appearance in Trophée des Champions)	0	16	2
Career total			136	22	8	2	25	4	3	0	172	28

=== International ===
As of match played 5 October 2026

Appearances and goals by national team and year
National team	Year	Apps	Goals
France	2025	5	1
France	2026	7	0
Total		12	1

As of match played 22 June 2026
France score listed first, score column indicates score after each Akliouche goal

List of international goals scored by Maghnes Akliouche
No.	Date	Venue	Cap	Opponent	Score	Result	Competition
1	16 November 2025	Tofiq Bahramov Republican Stadium, Baku, Azerbaijan	5	Azerbaijan	2–1	3–1	2026 FIFA World Cup qualification

== Honours ==
Paris Saint-Germain

- UEFA Super Cup: 2026

France Olympic

- Summer Olympics silver medal: 2024

Individual

- Maurice Revello Tournament Best XI: 2022

Order

- Knight of the National Order of Merit: 2024
