= Aleksandr Golovin (footballer) =

Russian footballer (born 1996)

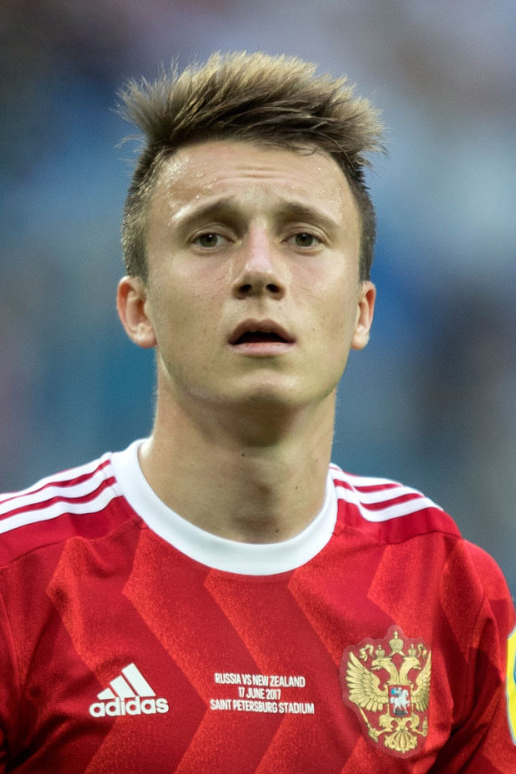
- Golovin with Russia at the 2017 FIFA Confederations Cup

Personal information
- Full name: Aleksandr Sergeyevich Golovin
- Date of birth: 30 May 1996 (age 30)
- Place of birth: Kaltan, Russia
- Height: 1.78 m (5 ft 10 in)
- Positions: Attacking midfielder; left winger

Team information
- Current team: Monaco
- Number: 10

Youth career
- 2001–2009: DYuSSh Kaltan
- 2009–2011: Metallurg Novokuznetsk
- 2012–2014: CSKA Moscow

Senior career*
Years	Team	Apps	(Gls)
2014–2018	CSKA Moscow	81	(9)
2018–	Monaco	216	(36)

International career^{‡}
2013	Russia U17	16	(1)
2014	Russia U18	4	(2)
2014–2015	Russia U19	11	(2)
2015	Russia U21	3	(0)
2015–	Russia	53	(11)
Medal record
Representing Russia
UEFA European Under-17 Championship
Winner	2013 Slovakia
UEFA European Under-19 Championship
Runner-up	2015 Greece
- * Club domestic league appearances and goals as of 21 November 2026 ‡ National team caps and goals as of 29 September 2026

Aleksandr Sergeyevich Golovin (Russian: Александр Сергеевич Головин, IPA: [ɐlʲɪˈksandr sʲɪrˈgʲe(j)ɪvʲɪtɕ gəlɐˈvʲin]; born 30 May 1996) is a Russian professional footballer who alternates between an attacking midfielder and a left winger for Ligue 1 club Monaco and captains the Russia national team.

Golovin began his professional career at CSKA Moscow in 2014, where he played in four Russian Premier League seasons, winning the league title in his second season, before moving to Monaco in 2018, for a club record fee of €30 million, becoming the first Russian to play for the club.

Golovin made his senior international debut for Russia in 2015 and was part of their squads at the UEFA European Championship in 2016 and 2020, and the 2018 FIFA World Cup.

== Early life ==
Golovin was born to a mining family in the small mining town of Kaltan in Southern Siberia, Russia. His father was friends with Aleksandr Plyasunov, a coach at the local youth sports school. When Golovin was six years old, he started playing football under Plyasunov, before moving on to the school of FC Novokuznetsk (then called Metallurg-Zapsib) and the Olympic reserve school in Leninsk-Kuznetsky. After playing for Metallurg, he was invited to play for the squad of the Siberian team. It was during this time that Golovin attracted the attention of scouts and was invited to play for PFC CSKA Moscow.

== Club career ==
=== CSKA Moscow ===
Golovin debuted playing for PFC CSKA Moscow on 24 September 2014 against FC Khimik Dzerzhinsk in the 1/16 round of the Russian Cup. He made the starting lineup and was subbed out in the 88th minute of the game.

Golovin made his Russian Football Premier League debut for PFC CSKA Moscow on 14 March 2015 in a game against FC Mordovia Saransk as a sub in the 72nd minute of the game. He made his UEFA Champions League debut against Sparta Prague on 5 August 2015, subbing in for Alan Dzagoev. He scored his first goal for CSKA on 9 April 2016 against FC Mordovia Saransk.

In the summer of 2017, Arsenal offered between £8 and £10 million for Golovin, but CSKA declined the transfer.

On 2 December 2016, Golovin extended his contract with CSKA Moscow until the end of the 2020–21 season.

=== Monaco ===
On 27 July 2018, Golovin signed a five-year contract with AS Monaco for an undisclosed, but record-transfer fee, from CSKA Moscow. Golovin made his competitive debut for Monaco in a 1–1 Ligue 1 home draw against Nîmes on 21 September 2018, coming on as a substitute during the 72nd minute. He made his first start in Ligue 1 on 25 September, in a 0–1 home defeat against Angers. He scored his first Ligue 1 goal on 2 February 2019, in a 2–1 home win over Toulouse.

On 24 September 2019, Golovin scored two goals and provided an assist for Wissam Ben Yedder in Monaco's 3–1 Ligue 1 home win over Nice. On 6 January 2021, in an away match against Lorient and with the score at 1–1, Golovin, who had just recovered from an injury, was brought on as a substitute and scored after less than a minute. Two weeks later, as a substitute once again, he delivered two assists, each from a corner kick, to help his team come from behind and defeat Marseille.

On 7 February 2021, Golovin scored his first hat-trick for Monaco in a 4–3 away victory against Nîmes. In doing so, he became the first player from Russia to record a hat-trick in Ligue 1.

On 28 December 2022, Golovin gave an assist in a 3–2 away victory against Auxerre. On 11 February 2023, he scored the opening goal in a 3–1 home win against Paris Saint-Germain, his fifth goal of the season. On 19 February 2023, he scored his sixth goal of the season against Stade Brestois. On 4 October 2024, he extended his contract with the club until 2029.

== International career ==
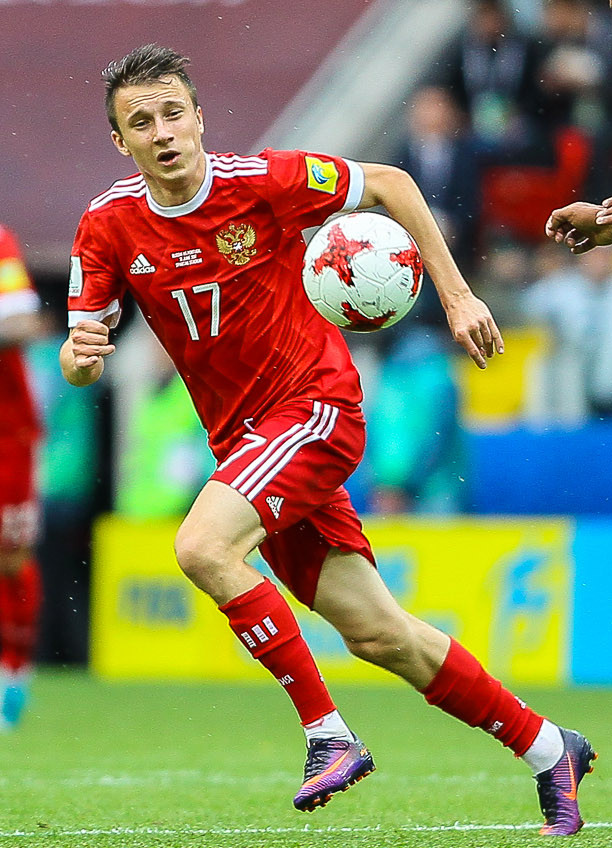
Golovin playing for Russia at the 2017 FIFA Confederations Cup

Golovin won the 2013 UEFA European Under-17 Championship with Russia national under-17 team, with which he also participated in the 2013 FIFA U-17 World Cup. Later, Golovin went on to represent the Russia national under-19 team at the 2015 UEFA European Under-19 Championship, where Russia came in second place. Golovin made his debut for the Russia national team on 7 June 2015 in a friendly game against Belarus at the Arena Khimki, replacing captain Roman Shirokov in the 61st minute and scoring Russia's second goal of a 4–2 victory 16 minutes later.

On 11 May 2018, he was included in Russia's extended 2018 FIFA World Cup squad. On 3 June 2018, he was included in the finalized World Cup squad. On 14 June 2018, he played a crucial role in Russia's 5–0 victory over Saudi Arabia making two assists and scoring the final goal, a free-kick in the opening match of the 2018 World Cup.

On 11 May 2021, he was included in the preliminary extended 30-man squad for UEFA Euro 2020. On 2 June 2021, he was included in the final squad. He played every minute in all 3 of Russia's group stage games as Russia was eliminated after losing to Belgium and Denmark and beating Finland.

On 7 September 2025, he scored the first goal of a 4–1 victory against Qatar in a friendly match.

On 29 September 2026, Golovin had his first multi-goal national team game, scoring a brace in a 2–0 friendly victory over Iran, including a direct free kick goal.

== Career statistics ==
=== Club ===
As of match played 8 November 2026

Appearances and goals by club, season and competition
Club	Season	League			National cup (Note: Includes Russian Cup, Coupe de France)		League cup (Note: Includes Coupe de la Ligue)		Europe		Other		Total	
Club	Season	Division	Apps	Goals	Apps	Goals	Apps	Goals	Apps	Goals	Apps	Goals	Apps	Goals
CSKA Moscow	2014–15	Russian Premier League	7	0	3	0	—		0	0	—		10	0
CSKA Moscow	2015–16	Russian Premier League	17	1	4	2	—		2 (Note: Appearances in UEFA Champions League)	0	—		23	3
CSKA Moscow	2016–17	Russian Premier League	30	3	0	0	—		6	0	1 (Note: Appearance in Russian Super Cup)	0	37	3
CSKA Moscow	2017–18	Russian Premier League	27	5	1	0	—		15 (Note: Ten appearances in UEFA Champions League, five appearances and two goals in UEFA Europa League)	2	—		43	7
CSKA Moscow	Total		81	9	8	2	—		23	2	1	0	113	13
Monaco	2018–19	Ligue 1	30	3	1	0	1	1	3	0	0	0	35	4
Monaco	2019–20	Ligue 1	25	3	3	0	2	0	—		—		30	3
Monaco	2020–21	Ligue 1	21	5	5	1	—		—		—		26	6
Monaco	2021–22	Ligue 1	27	3	2	0	—		11 (Note: Four appearances and one goal in UEFA Champions League, seven appearances in UEFA Europa League)	1	—		40	4
Monaco	2022–23	Ligue 1	34	8	1	0	—		10 (Note: Two appearances in UEFA Champions League, eight appearances in UEFA Europa League)	0	—		45	8
Monaco	2023–24	Ligue 1	25	6	2	0	—		—		—		27	6
Monaco	2024–25	Ligue 1	19	3	0	0	—		9	0	1 (Note: Appearance in Trophée des Champions)	0	29	3
Monaco	2025–26	Ligue 1	25	5	3	0	—		7	0	—		35	5
Monaco	2026–27	Ligue 1	10	0	0	0	—		4 (Note: Appearances in UEFA Conference League)	1	—		14	1
Monaco	Total		216	36	17	1	3	1	44	2	1	0	281	40
Career total			297	45	25	3	3	1	67	4	2	0	394	53

=== International ===
As of match played 29 September 2026

Appearances and goals by national team and year
National team	Year	Apps	Goals
Russia	2015	1	1
Russia	2016	7	1
Russia	2017	7	0
Russia	2018	10	1
Russia	2019	8	2
Russia	2021	12	0
Russia	2023	1	1
Russia	2024	1	0
Russia	2025	3	2
Russia	2026	3	3
Total		53	11

Scores and results list Russia's goal tally first.

List of international goals scored by Aleksandr Golovin
No.	Date	Venue	Opponent	Score	Result	Competition
1.	7 June 2015	Arena Khimki, Khimki, Russia	Belarus	2–2	4–2	Friendly
2.	26 March 2016	Otkritie Arena, Moscow, Russia	Lithuania	2–0	3–0	Friendly
3.	14 June 2018	Luzhniki Stadium, Moscow, Russia	Saudi Arabia	5–0	5–0	2018 FIFA World Cup
4.	10 October 2019	Luzhniki Stadium, Moscow, Russia	Scotland	4–0	4–0	UEFA Euro 2020 qualification
5.	13 October 2019	GSP Stadium, Nicosia, Cyprus	Cyprus	4–0	5–0	UEFA Euro 2020 qualification
6.	20 November 2023	Volgograd Arena, Volgograd, Russia	Cuba	2–0	8–0	Friendly
7.	7 September 2025	Jassim bin Hamad Stadium, Al Rayyan, Qatar	Qatar	1–0	4–1	Friendly
8.	12 November 2025	Krestovsky Stadium, Saint Petersburg, Russia	Peru	1–0	1–1	Friendly
9.	27 March 2026	Krasnodar Stadium, Krasnodar, Russia	Nicaragua	3–1	3–1	Friendly
10.	29 September 2026	Ak Bars Arena, Kazan, Russia	Iran	1–0	2–0	Friendly
11.	29 September 2026	Ak Bars Arena, Kazan, Russia	Iran	2–0	2–0	Friendly

== Honours ==
CSKA Moscow

- Russian Premier League: 2015–16

Monaco

- Coupe de France runner-up: 2020–21

Russia U17

- UEFA European Under-17 Championship: 2013

Russia U19

- UEFA European Under-19 Championship runner-up: 2015

Individual

- The Athletic Ligue 1 Team of the Season: 2023–24
