= Caio Henrique =

Brazilian footballer (born 1997)

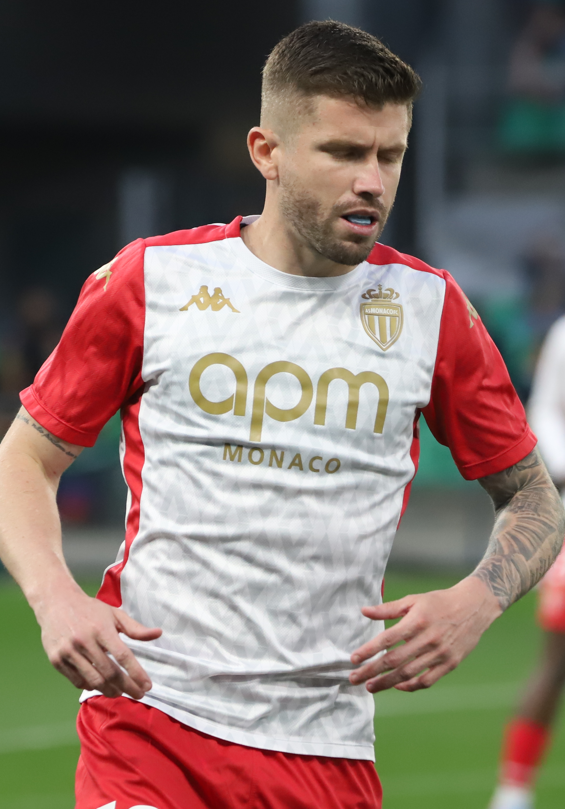
- Caio Henrique with Monaco in 2025

Personal information
- Full name: Caio Henrique Oliveira Silva
- Date of birth: 31 July 1997 (age 29)
- Place of birth: Santos, São Paulo, Brazil
- Height: 1.78 m (5 ft 10 in)
- Positions: Left-back; left wing-back

Team information
- Current team: Ajax
- Number: 12

Youth career
- 2008–2016: Santos
- 2016: Atlético Madrid

Senior career*
Years	Team	Apps	(Gls)
2016–2018	Atlético Madrid B	20	(1)
2016–2020	Atlético Madrid	0	(0)
2018	→ Paraná (loan)	27	(0)
2019	→ Fluminense (loan)	49	(2)
2020	→ Grêmio (loan)	3	(0)
2020–2026	Monaco	158	(3)
2026–	Ajax	7	(0)

International career^{‡}
2016–2017	Brazil U20	13	(0)
2019–2020	Brazil Olympic	11	(0)
2023–	Brazil	5	(0)
- * Club domestic league appearances and goals as of 19 September 2026 (UTC) ‡ National team caps and goals as of 18 November 2025 (UTC)

Caio Henrique Oliveira Silva (born 31 July 1997), known as Caio Henrique (Brazilian Portuguese: [ˈkaju ẽˈʁiki]), is a Brazilian professional footballer who plays as a left-back or left wing-back for Eredivisie club Ajax and the Brazil national team.

== Club career ==
Born in Santos, São Paulo, Caio joined Santos' youth setup in 2008, aged ten. On 1 February 2016, he was sold to Atlético Madrid, as his contract was due to expire.

Caio was promoted to the reserves ahead of the 2016–17 campaign, but spent the whole pre-season with the main squad. He made his senior debut on 28 August 2016, starting in a 1–0 Tercera División away win against Fútbol Alcobendas Sport.

Caio made his professional debut on 30 November 2016, starting in a 6–0 Copa del Rey away routing of Guijuelo. He would resume his appearances with the B-side, however.

On 3 April 2018, Caio returned to his home country after agreeing to a loan deal with Série A side Paraná, until December.

He spent the 2019 season on loan at Fluminense, making 65 appearances and scoring twice. In January 2020, he joined Grêmio also on loan, making only five appearances for the side before the stoppage of football in Brazil due to concerns over the COVID-19 pandemic.

=== Monaco ===
On 27 August 2020, Caio Henrique joined Ligue 1 club Monaco, signing a five-year contract with the principality club. On 15 January 2021, he provided a right-footed assist to his captain Wissam Ben Yedder who scored a header against Montpellier. On the 22nd matchday of the season, he again provided an assist to Kevin Volland with a subtle dip against Nantes.

His season was so successful that he even aroused the interest of Paris-Saint-Germain and Barcelona during the transfer window; despite this, he decided to stay at Monaco.

On 6 August 2021, in the opening match of the 2021–22 season, he provided an assist to Gelson Martins, who scored the first goal in Ligue 1. On September 26, he provided two assists to his captain Wissam Ben Yedder and Kevin Volland, for a 3–1 victory over Clermont Foot. He played his 50th game for Monaco in a 1–1 UEFA Europa League draw against Real Sociedad.

On 3 April 2022, he delivered his tenth assist of the season against Metz in a 2–1 away victory.

=== Ajax ===
On 28 June 2026, Henrique joined Eredivisie club Ajax on a five-year contract for a reported €14 million fee.

== International career ==
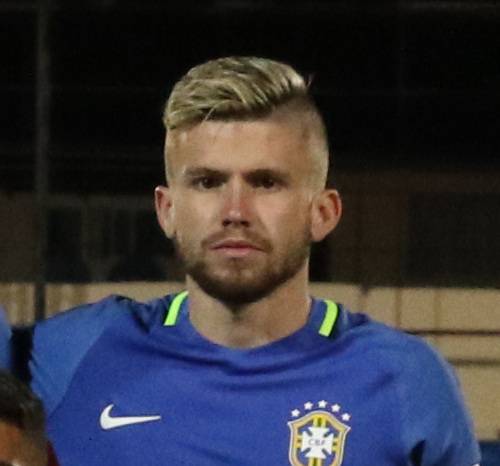
Caio Henrique with Brazil U20 in 2017

Caio Henrique is a youth international for Brazil, having played up to the Brazil U23s. In January 2021, he gained Spanish citizenship after years of residency while at Atlético Madrid, and expressed interest in representing the Spain national team.

In August 2023, he received his first call-up to the Brazil senior national team by interim head coach Fernando Diniz, for two 2026 FIFA World Cup qualification matches against Bolivia and Peru.

== Career statistics ==
=== Club ===
As of match played 19 September 2026

Appearances and goals by club, season and competition
Club	Season	League			State league (Note: Includes Campeonato Carioca, Campeonato Gaúcho)		National cup (Note: Includes Copa del Rey, Copa do Brasil, Coupe de France)		Continental		Other		Total	
Club	Season	Division	Apps	Goals	Apps	Goals	Apps	Goals	Apps	Goals	Apps	Goals	Apps	Goals
Atlético Madrid B	2016–17	Tercera División	15	1	—		—		—		—		15	1
Atlético Madrid B	2017–18	Segunda División B	5	0	—		—		—		—		5	0
Atlético Madrid B	Total		20	1	—		—		—		—		20	1
Atlético Madrid	2016–17	La Liga	0	0	—		1	0	0	0	—		1	0
Paraná (loan)	2018	Série A	27	0	—		0	0	—		—		27	0
Fluminense (loan)	2019	Série A	35	1	14	1	8	0	8 (Note: Appearances in Copa Sudamericana)	0	—		65	2
Grêmio (loan)	2020	Série A	0	0	3	0	0	0	2 (Note: Appearances in Copa Libertadores)	0	—		5	0
Monaco	2020–21	Ligue 1	31	0	—		5	0	—		—		36	0
Monaco	2021–22	Ligue 1	34	2	—		3	0	12 (Note: Four appearances in UEFA Champions League, eight appearances in UEFA Europa League)	0	—		49	2
Monaco	2022–23	Ligue 1	35	1	—		1	0	9 (Note: One appearance in UEFA Champions League, eight appearances in UEFA Europa League)	0	—		45	1
Monaco	2023–24	Ligue 1	9	0	—		0	0	—		—		9	0
Monaco	2024–25	Ligue 1	27	0	—		2	0	8 (Note: Appearances in UEFA Champions League)	0	1 (Note: Appearance in Trophée des Champions)	0	38	0
Monaco	2025–26	Ligue 1	22	0	—		3	0	9	0	—		34	0
Monaco	Total		158	3	—		15	0	37	0	1	0	211	3
Ajax	2026–27	Eredivisie	7	0	—		0	0	5 (Note: Appearances in UEFA Conference League)	0	—		12	0
Career total			247	5	17	1	23	0	53	0	1	0	341	6

=== International ===
As of match played 18 November 2025

Appearances and goals by national team and year
National team	Year	Apps	Goals
Brazil	2023	1	0
Brazil	2025	4	0
Total		5	0

== Honours ==
Monaco

- Coupe de France runner-up: 2020–21
