= Vanderson (footballer, born 2001) =

Brazilian footballer (born 2001)

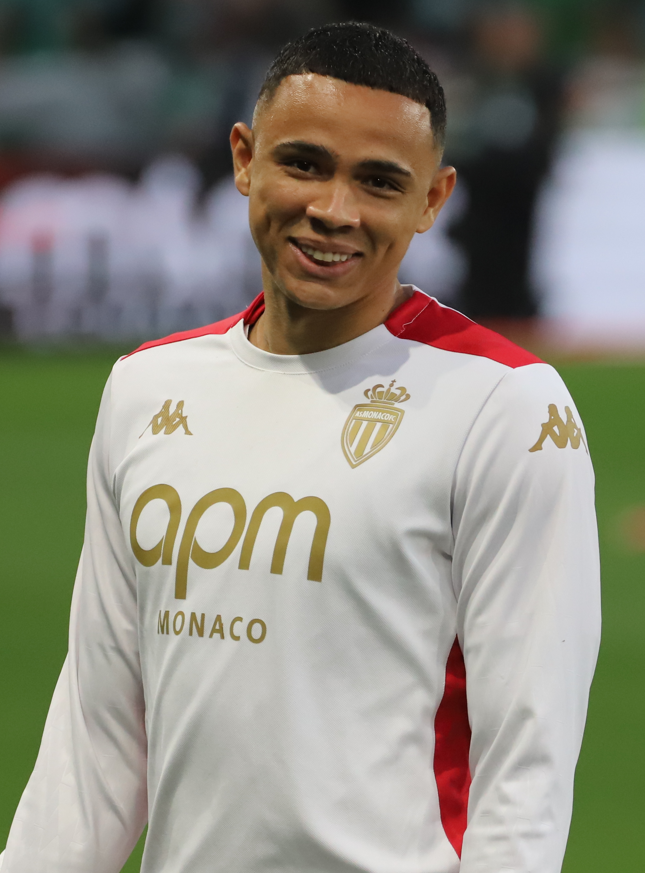
- Vanderson with Monaco in 2025

Personal information
- Full name: Vanderson de Oliveira Campos
- Date of birth: 21 June 2001 (age 25)
- Place of birth: Rondonópolis, Mato Grosso, Brazil
- Height: 1.73 m (5 ft 8 in)
- Positions: Right-back; right wing-back

Team information
- Current team: Monaco
- Number: 2

Youth career
- 2012–2017: União Rondonópolis
- 2017–2019: Rio Branco-SP
- 2019–2020: Grêmio

Senior career*
Years	Team	Apps	(Gls)
2020–2022	Grêmio	42	(4)
2022–	Monaco	122	(7)

International career^{‡}
2023–	Brazil	8	(1)
- * Club domestic league appearances and goals as of 21 November 2026 ‡ National team caps and goals as of 29 September 2026

Vanderson de Oliveira Campos (born 21 June 2001), simply known as Vanderson (Brazilian Portuguese: [ˈvɐ̃deʁsõw̃]), is a Brazilian professional footballer who plays as a right-back or right wing-back for Ligue 1 club Monaco and the Brazil national team.

== Club career ==
On 18 December 2020, Vanderson signed a four-year contract with Grêmio. He made his professional debut with the club in a 2–1 Campeonato Brasileiro Série A win over Atlético Goianiense on 28 December 2020.

On 1 January 2022, Vanderson signed for Ligue 1 club Monaco on a contract until June 2027. The transfer fee paid to Grêmio was reportedly €11 million.

== Career statistics ==
=== Club ===
As of match played 21 November 2026

Appearances and goals by club, season and competition
Club	Season	League			Cup		Continental		Other		Total	
Club	Season	Division	Apps	Goals	Apps	Goals	Apps	Goals	Apps	Goals	Apps	Goals
Grêmio	2020	Série A	5	1	2	0	—		—		7	1
Grêmio	2021	Série A	30	3	5	0	5 (Note: Two appearances in Copa Libertadores, three appearances in Copa Sudamericana)	0	12 (Note: Appearances in Campeonato Gaúcho)	1	52	4
Grêmio	Total		35	4	7	0	5	0	12	1	59	5
Monaco	2021–22	Ligue 1	17	2	3	0	2 (Note: Appearances in UEFA Europa League)	0	—		22	2
Monaco	2022–23	Ligue 1	31	1	0	0	8 (Note: Two appearances in UEFA Champions League, six appearances in UEFA Europa League)	0	—		39	1
Monaco	2023–24	Ligue 1	20	3	3	0	—		—		23	3
Monaco	2024–25	Ligue 1	29	1	2	1	9 (Note: Appearances in UEFA Champions League)	0	1 (Note: Appearance in Trophée des Champions)	0	41	2
Monaco	2025–26	Ligue 1	14	0	1	0	8	0	—		23	0
Monaco	2026–27	Ligue 1	11	0	0	0	4 (Note: Appearances in UEFA Conference League)	0	—		15	0
Monaco	Total		122	7	9	1	31	0	1	0	163	8
Career total			157	11	16	1	36	0	13	1	222	13

=== International ===
As of match played 29 September 2026

Appearances and goals by national team and year
National team	Year	Apps	Goals
Brazil	2023	2	0
Brazil	2024	2	0
Brazil	2025	3	0
Brazil	2026	1	1
Total		8	1

Scores and results list Brazil's goal tally first, score column indicates score after each Vanderson goal.

List of international goals scored by Vanderson
No.	Date	Venue	Cap	Opponent	Score	Result	Competition
1	29 September 2026	Lang Park, Brisbane, Australia	8	Australia	1–0	4–2	Friendly

== Honours ==
Grêmio

- Copa do Brasil runner-up: 2020
- Campeonato Gaúcho: 2021
- Recopa Gaúcha: 2021
