= Denis Zakaria =

Swiss footballer (born 1996)

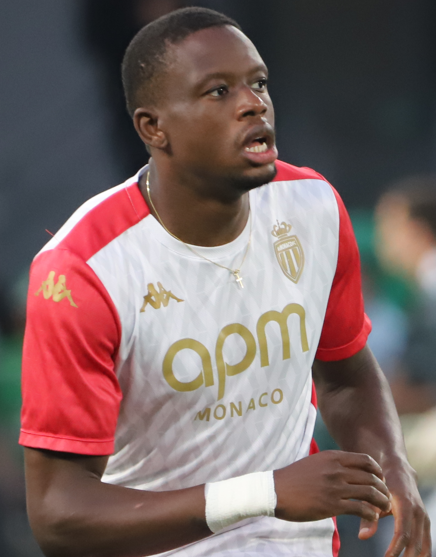
- Zakaria with Monaco in 2025

Personal information
- Full name: Denis Lemi Zakaria Lako Lado
- Date of birth: 20 November 1996 (age 29)
- Place of birth: Geneva, Switzerland
- Height: 1.91 m (6 ft 3 in)
- Position: Defensive midfielder

Team information
- Current team: Monaco
- Number: 6

Youth career
- 2004–2015: Servette

Senior career*
Years	Team	Apps	(Gls)
2014–2015	Servette II	13	(1)
2014–2015	Servette	6	(2)
2015–2017	Young Boys	50	(2)
2017–2022	Borussia Mönchengladbach	125	(11)
2022–2023	Juventus	11	(1)
2022–2023	→ Chelsea (loan)	7	(0)
2023–	Monaco	82	(12)

International career^{‡}
2014–2015	Switzerland U19	8	(2)
2015–2016	Switzerland U21	8	(0)
2016–	Switzerland	70	(3)
- * Club domestic league appearances and goals as of 19:12, 18 October 2026 (UTC) ‡ National team caps and goals as of 23:40, 13 November 2026 (UTC)

Denis Lemi Zakaria Lako Lado (born 20 November 1996) is a Swiss professional footballer who plays as a defensive midfielder for Ligue 1 club Monaco, whom he captains, and the Switzerland national team. He has also represented Switzerland internationally at youth level.

== Club career ==
=== Servette ===
Born in Geneva, Switzerland, to a South Sudanese father and a Congolese mother, he first began playing for local club Servette.

=== Young Boys ===
Zakaria joined Young Boys in June 2015 for an undisclosed fee, signing a four-year contract. He made his Swiss Super League debut on 18 July 2015 against FC Zürich in 1–1 away draw replacing Alexander Gerndt after 79 minutes.

=== Borussia Mönchengladbach ===
In June 2017, Zakaria signed a five-year contract with Borussia Mönchengladbach. He was transferred as a replacement for Mahmoud Dahoud who left the club for Borussia Dortmund. The transfer fee paid to Young Boys for Zakaria was reported as €10 million. Zakaria scored a total of 11 goals in 125 appearances for Borussia Mönchengladbach.

=== Juventus ===
On 31 January 2022, with six months remaining on his contract, Zakaria moved to Serie A club Juventus on a four-and-a-half-year contract, in a deal worth €8.6 million. On 6 February, Zakaria scored on his debut in the 61st minute, helping his side beat Hellas Verona 2–0.

==== Loan to Chelsea ====
On 1 September 2022, Zakaria was loaned to Premier League club Chelsea until the end of the 2022–23 season with an option of a permanent transfer at the end of the season. On 2 November 2022, Zakaria made his Chelsea debut in the club's final UEFA Champions League group stage match, scoring the winning goal of a 2–1 victory against Dinamo Zagreb.

=== Monaco ===
On 14 August 2023, Zakaria moved to Ligue 1 club Monaco on a five-year contract.

== International career ==
Zakaria played for various Swiss youth national teams. He could have represented either Switzerland, South Sudan or Congo at a senior level due to being born in Switzerland and having a Congolese mother and a South Sudanese father.

Zakaria made his debut for the senior Switzerland national team in a friendly 2–1 loss to Belgium on 28 May 2016. He was part of the squad for the 2016 European Championships. Zakaria was included in the 23-man squad for the 2018 FIFA World Cup.

In May 2019, Zakaria played in the 2019 UEFA Nations League Finals, where his team finished fourth. He was named in the 26-man Swiss squad for the UEFA Euro 2020. On 2 July 2021, he scored an own goal in the 8th minute of Switzerland's quarter-final match against Spain, which they went on to lose on penalties. His own goal was the fastest in European Championship history, breaking Wojciech Szczęsny’s record of 18 minutes vs Slovakia earlier in the same tournament until Donyell Malen broke the record in the next tournament with an own goal in the 6th minute during the Netherlands vs Austria.

On 20 May 2026, Zakaria was selected in the 26-man squad for the 2026 FIFA World Cup.

== Style of play ==
Due to his characteristics and playing style, Zakaria has been compared with former France international Patrick Vieira as well as Paul Pogba. Zakaria has been described as a midfield powerhouse due to his pace, strength, athleticism and aggressive playing style. He is also known for being a composed passer and for making surging forward runs from midfield. Primarily a defensive midfielder, he is also capable of playing as a central midfielder, in a holding role, or a box-to-box role, and has even played as a central defender.

== Career statistics ==
=== Club ===
As of match played 18 October 2026

Appearances and goals by club, season and competition
Club	Season	League			National cup (Note: Includes Swiss Cup, DFB-Pokal, Coppa Italia, FA Cup, Coupe de France)		League cup (Note: Includes EFL Cup)		Europe		Other		Total	
Club	Season	Division	Apps	Goals	Apps	Goals	Apps	Goals	Apps	Goals	Apps	Goals	Apps	Goals
Servette	2014–15	Swiss Challenge League	6	2	0	0	—		—		—		6	2
Young Boys	2015–16	Swiss Super League	27	1	3	0	—		3 (Note: One appearance in UEFA Champions League, two appearances in UEFA Europa League)	0	—		33	1
Young Boys	2016–17	Swiss Super League	23	1	4	0	—		7 (Note: Two appearances in UEFA Champions League, five appearances in UEFA Europa League)	0	—		34	1
Young Boys	Total		50	2	7	0	—		10	0	—		67	2
Borussia Mönchengladbach	2017–18	Bundesliga	30	2	3	0	—		—		—		33	2
Borussia Mönchengladbach	2018–19	Bundesliga	31	4	1	0	—		—		—		32	4
Borussia Mönchengladbach	2019–20	Bundesliga	23	2	2	0	—		6 (Note: Appearances in UEFA Europa League)	0	—		31	2
Borussia Mönchengladbach	2020–21	Bundesliga	25	1	2	0	—		5 (Note: Appearance(s) in UEFA Champions League)	0	—		32	1
Borussia Mönchengladbach	2021–22	Bundesliga	16	2	2	0	—		—		—		18	2
Borussia Mönchengladbach	Total		125	11	10	0	—		11	0	—		146	11
Juventus	2021–22	Serie A	9	1	3	0	—		1	0	—		13	1
Juventus	2022–23	Serie A	2	0	—		—		—		—		2	0
Juventus	Total		11	1	3	0	—		1	0	—		15	1
Chelsea (loan)	2022–23	Premier League	7	0	1	0	1	0	2	1	—		11	1
Monaco	2023–24	Ligue 1	25	4	3	0	—		—		—		28	4
Monaco	2024–25	Ligue 1	26	6	0	0	—		7	1	1 (Note: Appearance in Trophée des Champions)	0	34	7
Monaco	2025–26	Ligue 1	24	2	3	0	—		6	0	—		33	2
Monaco	2026–27	Ligue 1	7	0	0	0	—		3 (Note: Appearances in UEFA Conference League)	0	—		10	0
Monaco	Total		82	12	6	0	—		16	1	1	0	105	13
Career total			280	28	27	0	1	0	40	2	1	0	349	30

=== International ===
As of match played 13 November 2026

Appearances and goals by national team and year
National team	Year	Apps	Goals
Switzerland	2016	3	0
Switzerland	2017	6	0
Switzerland	2018	9	1
Switzerland	2019	10	2
Switzerland	2020	0	0
Switzerland	2021	12	0
Switzerland	2022	5	0
Switzerland	2023	7	0
Switzerland	2024	5	0
Switzerland	2025	4	0
Switzerland	2026	9	0
Total		70	3

Scores and results list Switzerland's goal tally first, score column indicates score after each Zakaria goal.

List of international goals scored by Denis Zakaria
No.	Date	Venue	Cap	Opponent	Score	Result	Competition	Ref.
1	8 September 2018	Kybunpark, St. Gallen, Switzerland	13	Iceland	2–0	6–0	2018–19 UEFA Nations League A	
2	23 March 2019	Boris Paichadze Dinamo Arena, Tbilisi, Georgia	19	Georgia	2–0	2–0	UEFA Euro 2020 qualification	
3	8 September 2019	Stade Tourbillon, Sion, Switzerland	24	Gibraltar	1–0	4–0	UEFA Euro 2020 qualification	

== Honours ==
Juventus

- Coppa Italia runner-up: 2021–22

Individual

- Swiss Super League Young Player of the Year: 2016–17
- Swiss Super League Team of the Year: 2016–17
