= Yann Lienard =

French footballer (born 2003)

Personal information
- Full name: Yann François Lienard
- Date of birth: 16 March 2003 (age 23)
- Place of birth: Aubagne, France
- Height: 1.94 m (6 ft 4 in)
- Position: Goalkeeper

Team information
- Current team: Cercle Brugge (on loan from Monaco)
- Number: 21

Youth career
- 2009–2013: ES Bassin Minier
- 2013–2014: ASC de Peypin
- 2014–2016: FC Étoile Huveaune
- 2016–2017: Burel FC
- 2017: COC Saint-Louis
- 2017–2019: Air Bel
- 2019–2021: Monaco

Senior career*
Years	Team	Apps	(Gls)
2020–2022	Monaco B	14	(0)
2021–	Monaco	0	(0)
2026–	→ Cercle Brugge (loan)	0	(0)

International career^{‡}
2020	France U17	1	(0)
2021–2022	France U19	5	(0)
2022–2023	France U20	8	(0)
- * Club domestic league appearances and goals as of 6 September 2026 ‡ National team caps and goals as of 23:07, 2 November 2025 (UTC)

Yann François Lienard (born 16 March 2003) is a French professional footballer who plays as a goalkeeper for Belgian Pro League club Cercle Brugge on loan from Monaco.

== Career ==
Lienard is a product of the youth academies of the clubs ES Bassin Minier, ASC de Peypin, FC Étoile Huveaune, FC Étoile Huveaune, Burel FC, COC Saint-Louis, Air Bel and Monaco. He debuted with Monaco's reserves in the Championnat National 2 in 2020, and on 1 June 2021 signed his first professional contract with the club and was promoted to backup goalkeeper. On 17 August 2023, he extended his contract with Monaco until 2027. He made his senior debut with Monaco in a 4–1 Coupe de France win over L'Union Saint-Jean FC on 22 December 2024.

On 3 September 2026, Lienard was loaned by Cercle Brugge in Belgium for the 2026–27 season.

== International career ==
Born in France, Lienard is of Algerian descent. He was called up to the France U19s for the 2022 UEFA European Under-19 Championship. He played for the France U20s at the 2023 FIFA U-20 World Cup.

== Career statistics ==
As of match played 22 December 2024

Appearances and goals by club, season and competition
Club	Season	League			National cup		Continental		Other		Total	
Club	Season	Division	Apps	Goals	Apps	Goals	Apps	Goals	Apps	Goals	Apps	Goals
Monaco B	2020–21	National 2	3	0	—		—		—		3	0
Monaco B	2021–22	National 2	11	0	—		—		—		11	0
Monaco B	Total		14	0	—		—		—		14	0
Monaco	2021–22	Ligue 1	0	0	0	0	0	0	—		0	0
Monaco	2022–23	Ligue 1	0	0	0	0	0	0	—		0	0
Monaco	2023–24	Ligue 1	0	0	0	0	—		—		0	0
Monaco	2024–25	Ligue 1	0	0	1	0	0	0	0	0	1	0
Monaco	2025–26	Ligue 1	0	0	0	0	0	0	—		0	0
Monaco	Total		0	0	1	0	0	0	0	0	1	0
Career total			14	0	1	0	0	0	0	0	15	0
