= 2021–22 AS Monaco FC season =

Monaco
2021–22 season
- President: Dmitry Rybolovlev
- Head coach: Niko Kovač (until 30 December); Stéphane Nado (caretaker, from 30 December to 3 January); Philippe Clement (from 3 January)
- Stadium: Stade Louis II
- Ligue 1: 3rd
- Coupe de France: Semi-finals
- UEFA Champions League: Play-off round
- UEFA Europa League: Round of 16
- Top goalscorer: League: Wissam Ben Yedder (25); All: Wissam Ben Yedder (32)
- Highest home attendance: 5,476 vs Sparta Prague (10 August 2021)
- Lowest home attendance: 0 vs Nantes (6 August 2021)
- Average home league attendance: 2,738 (10 August 2021)
Home colours	Away colours	Third colours

The 2021–22 season was the 97th season in the existence of AS Monaco FC and the club's ninth consecutive season in the top flight of French football. In addition to the domestic league, Monaco participated in this season's editions of the Coupe de France, the UEFA Champions League and the UEFA Europa League.

== Season events ==
On 18 August, Sofiane Diop extended his contract with Monaco, keeping him at the club until the summer of 2026.

On 1 January, Monaco announced that head coach Niko Kovač had left his role on 30 December 2021.

On 3 January, Monaco announced the signing of Philippe Clement as the head coach with a three-season contract.

On 13 January, Eliot Matazo extended his contract with Monaco until the summer of 2026.

=== Transfers ===
==== Summer ====
On 25 June, Gil Dias left Monaco to sign for Benfica, and Arthur Zagré joined Utrecht on loan for the next two seasons, with Utrecht having the option to make the move permanent.

On 27 June, Monaco announced the loan signing of Alexander Nübel from Bayern Munich, until the end of the 2022–23 season.

On 12 July, Monaco announced the signing of Ismail Jakobs from 1. FC Köln on a contract until June 2026.

On 16 July, Jean-Eudes Aholou joined Strasbourg on a season-long loan deal.

On 18 July, Fodé Ballo-Touré left Monaco to join Milan.

On 20 July, youngsters Boris Popovic and Edgaras Utkus joined Cercle Brugge on loan for the season.

On 24 July, Monaco announced that Jorge had left the club to return to Brazil and sign for Palmeiras.

On 2 August, Henry Onyekuru left Monaco to sign permanently for Olympiacos for an undisclosed fee, and Monaco announced the signing of Jean Lucas to a five-year contract from Olympique Lyonnais.

On 4 August, Monaco announced the signing of Myron Boadu from AZ Alkmaar.

On 11 August, Monaco announced that Gabriel Pereira had left the club to return to Brazil and sign with Athletico Paranaense.

On 12 August, Giulian Biancone left Monaco to sign for Troyes. Two days later, 14 August, Enzo Millot left Monaco to sign for VfB Stuttgart.

On 19 August, Benjamin Lecomte joined Atlético Madrid on loan for the season.

On 25 August, Pietro Pellegri joined A.C. Milan on loan for the season, with the option to make the move permanent.

On 28 August, Antonio Barreca left Monaco to join Lecce on a season-long loan deal.

On 31 August, Anthony Musaba left Monaco to sign for SC Heerenveen on a season-long loan deal, whilst Willem Geubbels joined Nantes on a similar deal. Also on 31 August, Keita Baldé left Monaco to sign permanently for Cagliari, whilst Julien Serrano was also released by the club.

==== Winter ====
On 1 January, Monaco announced the signing of Vanderson from Grêmio, on a five-year contract.

On 22 January, Monaco announced that Wilson Isidor had been sold to Lokomotiv Moscow.

On 16 February, Strahinja Pavlović joined Basel on loan for the remainder of the season.

== Squad ==
As of match played 21 May 2022

No.	Player	Nationality	Position	Date of birth (age)	Signed from	Signed in	Contract ends	Apps.	Goals
Goalkeepers
1	Radosław Majecki	(Poland)	GK	16 November 1999 (age 26)	Legia Warsaw	2020	2024	17	0
16	Alexander Nübel	(Germany)	GK	30 September 1996 (age 30)	loan from Bayern Munich	2021	2023	49	0
30	Vito Mannone	(Italy)	GK	2 March 1988 (age 38)	Reading	2020	2022	11	0
Defenders
2	Vanderson	(Brazil)	DF	21 June 2001 (age 25)	Grêmio	2022	2027	22	2
3	Guillermo Maripán	(Chile)	DF	6 May 1994 (age 32)	Alavés	2019	2024	92	7
5	Benoît Badiashile	(France)	DF	6 March 2001 (age 25)	Academy	2016		118	4
6	Axel Disasi	(France)	DF	11 March 1998 (age 28)	Reims	2020	2025	80	6
12	Caio Henrique	(Brazil)	DF	31 July 1997 (age 29)	Atlético Madrid	2020	2025	85	2
19	Djibril Sidibé	(France)	DF	29 July 1992 (age 34)	Lille	2016	2022	170	6
26	Ruben Aguilar	(France)	DF	26 April 1993 (age 33)	Montpellier	2019	2024	100	3
34	Chrislain Matsima	(France)	DF	15 May 2002 (age 24)	Academy	2019		24	0
38	Yllan Okou	(France)	DF	23 December 2002 (age 23)	Academy	2020		1	0
Midfielders
4	Cesc Fàbregas	(Spain)	MF	4 May 1987 (age 39)	Chelsea	2019	2022	67	4
7	Gelson Martins	(Portugal)	MF	11 May 1995 (age 31)	Atlético Madrid	2019	2024	114	16
8	Aurélien Tchouaméni	(France)	MF	27 January 2000 (age 26)	Bordeaux	2020	2024	95	8
11	Jean Lucas	(Brazil)	MF	22 June 1998 (age 28)	Lyon	2021	2026	39	2
14	Ismail Jakobs	(Germany)	MF	17 August 1999 (age 27)	1. FC Köln	2021	2026	39	0
17	Aleksandr Golovin	(Russia)	MF	30 May 1996 (age 30)	CSKA Moscow	2018	2023	131	17
22	Youssouf Fofana	(France)	MF	10 January 1999 (age 27)	Strasbourg	2020	2024	93	1
27	Krépin Diatta	(Senegal)	MF	25 February 1999 (age 27)	Club Brugge	2021	2025	29	3
33	Tiago Ribeiro	(Portugal)	MF	14 March 2002 (age 24)	Porto	2018		1	0
35	Maghnes Akliouche	(France)	MF	25 February 2002 (age 24)	US Torcy	2017		8	0
36	Eliot Matazo	(Belgium)	MF	15 February 2002 (age 24)	Anderlecht	2018	2026	42	1
37	Sofiane Diop	(France)	MF	9 June 2000 (age 26)	Rennes	2018	2026	101	16
	Félix Lemaréchal	(France)	MF	7 August 2003 (age 23)	Bordeaux	2019		3	0
	Soungoutou Magassa	(France)	MF	8 October 2003 (age 23)	Academy	2021		1	0
Forwards
9	Myron Boadu	(Netherlands)	FW	14 January 2001 (age 25)	AZ	2021	2026	42	6
10	Wissam Ben Yedder	(France)	FW	12 August 1990 (age 36)	Sevilla	2019	2024	124	73
31	Kevin Volland	(Germany)	FW	30 July 1992 (age 34)	Bayer Leverkusen	2020	2024	91	32
Also under contract
	Jean Marcelin	(France)	DF	12 February 2000 (age 26)	Auxerre	2020	2024	0	0
	Pelé	(Guinea-Bissau)	MF	29 September 1991 (age 35)	Rio Ave	2018	2023	11	0
	Jonathan Bakali	(France)	FW	29 March 2002 (age 24)	Youth team	2020	2023	0	0
	Valentin Decarpentrie	(France)	FW	6 January 2002 (age 24)	Academy	2020		1	0
Players away on loan
6	Jean-Eudes Aholou	(Ivory Coast)	MF	20 March 1994 (age 32)	Strasbourg	2018	2023	23	0
13	Willem Geubbels	(France)	FW	16 August 2001 (age 25)	Lyon	2018		17	1
18	Arthur Zagre	(France)	DF	4 October 2001 (age 25)	Paris Saint-Germain	2019	2022	3	0
19	Pietro Pellegri	(Italy)	FW	17 March 2001 (age 25)	Genoa	2018		22	2
21	Strahinja Pavlović	(Serbia)	DF	24 May 2001 (age 25)	Partizan	2020	2024	12	0
25	Anthony Musaba	(Netherlands)	FW	6 December 2000 (age 25)	NEC Nijmegen	2020	2025	1	0
40	Benjamin Lecomte	(France)	GK	26 April 1991 (age 35)	Montpellier	2019	2024	60	0
	Antonio Barreca	(Italy)	DF	18 March 1995 (age 31)	Torino	2018	2023	9	0
Left during the season
23	Giulian Biancone	(France)	DF	31 March 2000 (age 26)	Academy	2018	2024	7	1
38	Enzo Millot	(France)	MF	17 July 2002 (age 24)	Academy	2018		3	0
39	Wilson Isidor	(France)	FW	27 August 2000 (age 26)	Rennes	2018		12	0
	Gabriel Pereira	(Brazil)	GK	7 February 2002 (age 24)	Grêmio	2019		0	0
	Julien Serrano	(France)	DF	13 February 1998 (age 28)	Le Pontet	2013	2022	11	0
	Keita Baldé	(Senegal)	FW	8 March 1995 (age 31)	Lazio	2017		60	16

== Transfers ==
=== In ===
Date	Position	Nationality	Player	From	Fee	Ref.
12 July 2021	MF	(Germany)	Ismail Jakobs	1. FC Köln	Undisclosed	
2 August 2021	MF	(Brazil)	Jean Lucas	Olympique Lyonnais	Undisclosed	
4 August 2021	FW	(Netherlands)	Myron Boadu	AZ Alkmaar	Undisclosed	
1 January 2022	DF	(Brazil)	Vanderson	Grêmio	Undisclosed	

=== Loans in ===
Date from	Position	Nationality	Player	From	Date until	Ref.
27 June 2021†	GK	(Germany)	Alexander Nübel	Bayern Munich	End of 2022–23 season	

† Transfers announced on the above date, became official when the transfer window opened on 1 July.

=== Out ===
Date	Position	Nationality	Player	To	Fee	Ref.
25 June 2021†	MF	(Portugal)	Gil Dias	Benfica	Undisclosed	
18 July 2021	DF	(Senegal)	Fodé Ballo-Touré	Milan	Undisclosed	
20 July 2021	MF	(Serbia)	Boris Popovic	Cercle Brugge	Undisclosed	
20 July 2021	MF	(Lithuania)	Edgaras Utkus	Cercle Brugge	Undisclosed	
24 July 2021	DF	(Brazil)	Jorge	Palmeiras	Undisclosed	
2 August 2021	MF	(Nigeria)	Henry Onyekuru	Olympiacos	Undisclosed	
11 August 2021	GK	(Brazil)	Gabriel Pereira	Athletico Paranaense	Undisclosed	
12 August 2021	DF	(France)	Giulian Biancone	Troyes	Undisclosed	
14 August 2021	MF	(France)	Enzo Millot	VfB Stuttgart	Undisclosed	
31 August 2021	FW	(Senegal)	Keita Baldé	Cagliari	Undisclosed	
22 January 2022	FW	(France)	Wilson Isidor	Lokomotiv Moscow	Undisclosed	

† Transfers announced on the above date, became official when the transfer window opened on 1 July.

=== Loans out ===
Date from	Position	Nationality	Player	To	Date until	Ref.
25 June 2021†	DF	(France)	Arthur Zagré	Utrecht	End of 2022–23 season	
16 July 2021	MF	(Ivory Coast)	Jean-Eudes Aholou	Strasbourg	End of season	
19 August 2021	GK	(France)	Benjamin Lecomte	Atlético Madrid	End of season	
25 August 2021	FW	(Italy)	Pietro Pellegri	A.C. Milan	End of season	
28 August 2021	DF	(Italy)	Antonio Barreca	Lecce	End of season	
31 August 2021	FW	(Netherlands)	Anthony Musaba	SC Heerenveen	End of season	
31 August 2021	FW	(France)	Willem Geubbels	Nantes	End of season	
16 February 2022	DF	(Serbia)	Strahinja Pavlović	Basel	End of season	

† Transfers announced on the above date, became official when the transfer window opened on 1 July.

=== Released ===
Date	Position	Nationality	Player	Joined	Date	Ref.
31 August 2021	DF	(France)	Julien Serrano	Créteil	16 December 2021	
30 June 2022	GK	(Italy)	Vito Mannone	Lorient	2 September 2022	
30 June 2022	DF	(France)	Djibril Sidibé	AEK Athens	9 September 2022	
30 June 2022	MF	(Spain)	Cesc Fàbregas	Como	1 August 2022	

== Friendlies ==
Win Draw Loss Fixtures

3 July 2021 Friendly	Red Bull Salzburg	1–3	Monaco	Bramberg am Wildkogel, Austria
16:00 CEST (UTC+2)	Aaronson 7'	Report	Millot 44'; Diop 64'; Musaba 90+1'

10 July 2021 Friendly	Monaco	3–1	Cercle Brugge	La Turbie, France
09:30 CEST (UTC+2)	Diop 16'; Matsima 42'; Pellegri 70'	Report	Velkovski 4'	Stadium: CMB Training Centre

17 July 2021 Friendly	Antwerp	0–0	Monaco	Antwerp, Belgium
17:00 CEST (UTC+2)		Report		Stadium: Bosuilstadion

24 July 2021 Friendly	VfL Wolfsburg	1–2	Monaco	Premstätten, Austria
16:00 CEST (UTC+2)	Gerhardt 39'	Report	Matazo (yellow card) 42'; Bornauw 65' (o.g.); Golovin 68'	Stadium: Sportpark Premstätten

28 July 2021 Friendly	Real Sociedad	2–1	Monaco	San Sebastián, Spain
18:00 CEST (UTC+2)	Januzaj 5'; Willian José 69'	Report	Golovin 41'	Stadium: Anoeta; Referee: Gorka Sagués Oskoz

== Competitions ==
=== Overall record ===
Competition	First match	Last match	Starting round	Final position	Record							
Competition	First match	Last match	Starting round	Final position	Pld	W	D	L	GF	GA	GD	Win %
Ligue 1	6 August 2021	21 May 2022	Matchday 1	3rd	38	20	9	9	65	40	+25	52.63
Coupe de France	19 December 2021	2 March 2022	Round of 64	Semi-finals	5	4	1	0	13	5	+8	80.00
UEFA Champions League	3 August 2021	25 August 2021	Third qualifying round	Play-off round	4	2	1	1	7	4	+3	50.00
UEFA Europa League	16 September 2021	17 March 2022	Group stage	Round of 16	8	3	4	1	8	7	+1	37.50
Total					55	29	15	11	93	56	+37	52.73

Source: Soccerway

=== Ligue 1 ===
==== League table ====
Pos	Team	Pld	W	D	L	GF	GA	GD	Pts	Qualification or relegation
1	Paris Saint-Germain (C)	38	26	8	4	90	36	+54	86	Qualification for the Champions League group stage
2	Marseille	38	21	8	9	63	38	+25	71	Qualification for the Champions League group stage
3	Monaco	38	20	9	9	65	40	+25	69	Qualification for the Champions League third qualifying round
4	Rennes	38	20	6	12	82	40	+42	66	Qualification for the Europa League group stage
5	Nice	38	20	7	11	52	36	+16	66 (Note: Nice were deducted one point for uncontrolled crowd trouble that caused the abandonment of their match against Marseille.)	Qualification for the Europa Conference League play-off round

Source: Ligue 1
Rules for classification: 1) Points; 2) Goal difference; 3) Head-to-head points; 4) Head-to-head goal difference; 5) Head-to-head goals scored; 6) Head-to-head away goals scored; 7) Goals scored; 8) Away goals scored; 9) Fair-play points (Note: Head-to-head record is used only after all the matches between the teams in question have been played).
(C) Champions

==== Results summary ====
Overall								Home						Away					
Pld	W	D	L	GF	GA	GD	Pts	W	D	L	GF	GA	GD	W	D	L	GF	GA	GD
38	20	9	9	65	40	+25	69	12	4	3	38	16	+22	8	5	6	27	24	+3

Source: Ligue 1

==== Results by round ====
Round	1	2	3	4	5	6	7	8	9	10	11	12	13	14	15	16	17	18	19	20	21	22	23	24	25	26	27	28	29	30	31	32	33	34	35	36	37	38
Ground	H	A	H	A	H	A	H	A	H	A	H	A	A	H	H	A	H	A	H	A	H	A	H	H	A	H	A	A	H	A	H	A	H	A	H	A	H	A
Result	D	L	L	W	L	D	W	W	W	L	W	L	D	D	D	W	W	L	W	D	W	L	W	D	D	L	W	L	W	W	W	W	W	W	W	W	W	D
Position	11	14	19	14	16	14	13	8	6	10	8	10	11	8	9	7	7	8	6	7	5	8	6	6	6	9	8	8	7	6	6	6	5	4	4	3	2	3

Source: Ligue 1
A = Away; H = Home; W = Win; D = Draw; L = Loss

==== Matches ====
The league fixtures were announced on 25 June 2021.

6 August 2021 1	Monaco	1–1	Nantes	Monaco
21:00 CEST (UTC+2)	Martins 14'	Report	Castelletto 42'	Stadium: Stade Louis II; Attendance: 0 Referee: Antony Gautier
Note: Match played behind closed doors.

13 August 2021 2	Lorient	1–0	Monaco	Lorient
21:00 CEST (UTC+2)	Moffi 31' (pen.); Mendes (yellow card) 52'; Monconduit (yellow card) 56'; Hamel (yellow card) 86'	Report	Jakobs (yellow card) 45'; Volland (yellow card) 90+1'	Stadium: Stade du Moustoir; Attendance: 12,149; Referee: Hakim Ben El Hadj

21 August 2021 3	Monaco	0–2	Lens	Monaco
17:00 CEST (UTC+2)	Pavlović (yellow card) 83'; Golovin (red card) 86'	Report	Ganago 51'; Doucouré (red card) 61'; Leca (yellow card) 61'; Banza 90+4'	Stadium: Stade Louis II; Attendance: 6,483; Referee: Jérémie Pignard

29 August 2021 4	Troyes	1–2	Monaco	Troyes
13:00 CEST (UTC+2)	Aguilar 51' (o.g.); El Hajjam (yellow card) 68'	Report	Maripán (yellow card) 28'; Diop 40', 58'; Tchouaméni (yellow card) 48'	Stadium: Stade de l'Aube; Attendance: 9,866; Referee: Johan Hamel

11 September 2021 5	Monaco	0–2	Marseille	Monaco
21:00 CEST (UTC+2)	Diop (yellow card) 23'; Tchouaméni (yellow card) 49'; Aguilar (yellow card) 57'; Fofana (yellow card) 83'	Report	Kamara (yellow card) 16'; Dieng 37', 60'	Stadium: Stade Louis II; Attendance: 8,615; Referee: Stéphanie Frappart

19 September 2021 6	Nice	2–2	Monaco	Nice
13:00 CEST (UTC+2)	Delort 52'; Atal (yellow card) 58'; Boudaoui 73'; Gouiri (penalty missed) 82'; Dante (yellow card) 87'	Report	Golovin 39'; Ben Yedder 77' (pen.); Badiashile (yellow card) 81'; Diop (yellow card) 89'; Sidibé (yellow card) 90+1'	Stadium: Allianz Riviera; Attendance: 0 Referee: François Letexier
Note: Match played behind closed doors.

22 September 2021 7	Monaco	3–1	Saint-Étienne	Monaco
19:00 CEST (UTC+2)	Sidibé (yellow card) 23'; Volland 27'; Ben Yedder 62' (pen.), 86'	Report	Green (red card) 33'; Bouanga 41'; Kolodziejczak (yellow card) 61'	Stadium: Stade Louis II; Attendance: 3,579; Referee: Jérôme Brisard

26 September 2021 8	Clermont	1–3	Monaco	Clermont-Ferrand
17:00 CEST (UTC+2)	Bayo 6'; Abdul Samed (yellow card) 35'; Gastien (yellow card) 54'	Report	Ben Yedder 25'; Pavlović (yellow card) 29'; Tchouaméni (yellow card) 45'; Volland 48', (yellow card) 70'; Diop (yellow card) 84', (goal) 90+1'	Stadium: Stade Gabriel Montpied; Attendance: 11,529; Referee: Benoît Millot

3 October 2021 9	Monaco	3–0	Bordeaux	Monaco
15:00 CEST (UTC+2)	Disasi (yellow card) 13'; Tchouaméni 35'; Golovin 48'; Ben Yedder 64' (pen.); Badiashile (yellow card) 86'	Report	Gregersen (yellow card) 86'	Stadium: Stade Louis II; Attendance: 3,667; Referee: Clément Turpin

16 October 2021 10	Lyon	2–0	Monaco	Décines-Charpieu
21:00 CEST (UTC+2)	Toko Ekambi 74' (pen.); Caqueret (yellow card) 76'; Denayer 89'	Report	Disasi (yellow card) 72'; Jean Lucas (yellow card) 75'	Stadium: Parc Olympique Lyonnais; Attendance: 50,585; Referee: Amaury Delerue

24 October 2021 11	Monaco	3–1	Montpellier	Monaco
17:00 CEST (UTC+2)	Volland 12'; Ben Yedder 17'; Maripán (yellow card) 24'; Martins 62'	Report	Cozza (yellow card) 43'; Ristić (yellow card) 52'; Makouana (yellow card) 66'; Savanier 81' (pen.), (yellow card) 87'	Stadium: Stade Louis II; Attendance: 4,861; Referee: François Letexier

31 October 2021 12	Brest	2–0	Monaco	Brest
17:00 CET (UTC+1)	Mounié 18'; Magnetti (yellow card) 53'; Honorat 79'	Report	Caio Henrique (yellow card) 17'; Diop (yellow card) 42'; Ben Yedder (yellow card) 81'; Volland (yellow card) 83'	Stadium: Stade Francis-Le Blé; Attendance: 12,463; Referee: Johan Hamel

7 November 2021 13	Reims	0–0	Monaco	Reims
15:00 CET (UTC+1)		Report	Golovin (yellow card) 25'; Badiashile (yellow card) 57'	Stadium: Stade Auguste Delaune; Attendance: 12,080; Referee: Jérémie Pignard

19 November 2021 14	Monaco	2–2	Lille	Monaco
21:00 CET (UTC+1)	Pavlović (yellow card) 3' (yellow-red card) 78'; Diatta 41'; Ben Yedder 82'; Fofana (yellow card) 84'	Report	David 5' (pen.), 9', (yellow card) 37'; Çelik (yellow card) 7'; Yazıcı (yellow card) 68'; Weah (yellow card) 73'; Niasse (yellow card) 85'	Stadium: Stade Louis II; Attendance: 3,778; Referee: Willy Delajod

28 November 2021 15	Monaco	1–1	Strasbourg	Monaco
15:00 CET (UTC+1)	Ben Yedder 45+1' (pen.); Fofana (yellow card) 47'; Volland (yellow card) 68'	Report	Sissoko (yellow card) 16'; Ajorque 47' (pen.)	Stadium: Stade Louis II; Attendance: 3,478; Referee: Antony Gautier

1 December 2021 16	Angers	1–3	Monaco	Angers
19:00 CET (UTC+1)	Mangani (yellow card) 42'; Nübel 55' (o.g.)	Report	Sidibé (yellow card) 10'; Boadu 25'; Volland (yellow card) 42'; Diop 45'; Disasi 73'	Stadium: Stade Raymond Kopa; Attendance: 8,267; Referee: Romain Lissorgue

5 December 2021 17	Monaco	4–0	Metz	Monaco
15:00 CET (UTC+1)	Diop 2'; Volland 44' (pen.), (yellow card) 49'; Martins 57'; Ben Yedder 87'	Report	Bronn (yellow card) 78'; Traoré (yellow card) 90'	Stadium: Stade Louis II; Attendance: 4,923; Referee: Bastien Dechepy

12 December 2021 18	Paris Saint-Germain	2–0	Monaco	Paris
20:45 CET (UTC+1)	Mbappé 12' (pen.), 45', (yellow card) 18'; Gueye (yellow card) 73'; Verratti (yellow card) 88'	Report	Sidibé (yellow card) 10'; Fofana (yellow card) 16'; Maripán (yellow card) 62'; Martins (yellow card) 72'	Stadium: Parc des Princes; Attendance: 41,154; Referee: Benoît Bastien

22 December 2021 19	Monaco	2–1	Rennes	Monaco
21:00 CET (UTC+1)	Ben Yedder 35' (pen.); Volland 72'; Maripán (yellow card) 80'; Tchouaméni (yellow card) 87'	Report	Truffert (yellow card) 13'; Terrier 16'	Stadium: Stade Louis II; Attendance: 5,354; Referee: Ruddy Buquet

9 January 2022 20	Nantes	0–0	Monaco	Nantes
17:05 CET (UTC+1)	Kolo Muani (yellow card) 22'	Report	Diop (yellow card) 72'; Matazo (yellow card) 80'	Stadium: Stade de la Beaujoire; Attendance: 4,133; Referee: Thomas Léonard

16 January 2022 21	Monaco	4–0	Clermont	Monaco
15:00 CET (UTC+1)	Diop 45+2'; Ben Yedder 55', 62' (pen.); Caio Henrique 83'	Report	Abdul Samed (yellow card) 56'	Stadium: Stade Louis II; Attendance: 2,633; Referee: Jérémy Stinat

23 January 2022 22	Montpellier	3–2	Monaco	Montpellier
17:05 CET (UTC+1)	Wahi 12'; Mavididi 32', 90+1', (yellow card) 90+2'; Sambia (yellow card) 90+2'	Report	Caio Henrique (yellow card) 10'; Ben Yedder 34'; Aguilar (yellow card) 65'; Vanderson 81'	Stadium: Stade de la Mosson; Attendance: 5,000; Referee: Jérémie Pignard

5 February 2022 23	Monaco	2–0	Lyon	Monaco
21:00 CET (UTC+1)	Jean Lucas 2'; Ben Yedder 27'; Maripán (yellow card) 69'	Report	Dembélé (yellow card) 64'; Boateng (yellow card) 69'	Stadium: Stade Louis II; Attendance: 6,550; Referee: Ruddy Buquet

13 February 2022 24	Monaco	0–0	Lorient	Monaco
13:00 CET (UTC+1)	Caio Henrique (yellow card) 45'; Aguilar (yellow card) 73'; Akliouche (yellow card) 89'	Report	Boisgard (yellow card) 37'; Laurienté (yellow card) 81'	Stadium: Stade Louis II; Attendance: 3,963; Referee: Bastien Dechepy

20 February 2022 25	Bordeaux	1–1	Monaco	Bordeaux
17:05 CET (UTC+1)	Oudin 22', (yellow card) 41'; Guilavogui (yellow card) 46'; Pembélé (yellow card) 56'	Report	Tchouaméni (yellow card) 28' (yellow-red card) 34'; Sidibé (yellow card) 34'; Marcelo 66' (o.g.); Vanderson (yellow card) 78'	Stadium: Matmut Atlantique; Attendance: 29,557; Referee: Jérémie Pignard

27 February 2022 26	Monaco	1–2	Reims	Monaco
13:00 CET (UTC+1)	Disasi (yellow card) 25'; Ben Yedder 55'; Jean Lucas (yellow card) 86' (yellow-red card) 88'	Report	Hornby (yellow card) 27'; Munetsi (yellow card) 42'; Volland 85' (o.g.); Mbuku 90+2'	Stadium: Stade Louis II; Attendance: 3,982; Referee: Benoît Millot

6 March 2022 27	Marseille	0–1	Monaco	Marseille
20:45 CET (UTC+1)	Peres (yellow card) 53'; Kamara (yellow card) 90+1'	Report	Disasi (yellow card) 56'; Martins 59'	Stadium: Stade Vélodrome; Attendance: 56,510; Referee: Antony Gautier

13 March 2022 28	Strasbourg	1–0	Monaco	Strasbourg
15:00 CET (UTC+1)	Djiku 23'; Prcić (yellow card) 65'	Report	Tchouaméni (yellow card) 4'; Diop (yellow card) 44'	Stadium: Stade de la Meinau; Attendance: 25,231; Referee: Eric Wattellier

20 March 2022 29	Monaco	3–0	Paris Saint-Germain	Monaco
13:00 CET (UTC+1)	Ben Yedder 25', 84' (pen.); Martins (yellow card) 30'; Volland (yellow card) 65', (goal) 68'; Tchouaméni (yellow card) 74'	Report	Mbappé (yellow card) 52'; Neymar (yellow card) 53'; Kimpembe (yellow card) 82'	Stadium: Stade Louis II; Attendance: 16,642; Referee: Benoît Bastien

3 April 2022 30	Metz	1–2	Monaco	Metz
15:00 CEST (UTC+2)	Amadou 62'	Report	Ben Yedder 46'; Boadu 72'	Stadium: Stade Saint-Symphorien; Attendance: 19,812; Referee: Jérôme Brisard

10 April 2022 31	Monaco	2–1	Troyes	Monaco
15:00 CEST (UTC+2)	Caio Henrique 19'; Aguilar (yellow card) 22'; Volland 57'; Ben Yedder (yellow card) 71'	Report	Ugbo 39'; Biancone (yellow card) 72'; Kouamé (yellow card) 81'	Stadium: Stade Louis II; Attendance: 4,786; Referee: Mikael Lesage

15 April 2022 32	Rennes	2–3	Monaco	Rennes
21:00 CEST (UTC+2)	Tait 3'; Omari (yellow card) 85'; Terrier 90+3' (pen.)	Report	Vanderson 12', (yellow card) 43'; Badiashile (yellow card) 46'; Ben Yedder 57'; Boadu 77'; Caio Henrique (yellow card) 84'	Stadium: Roazhon Park; Attendance: 28,336; Referee: Stéphanie Frappart

20 April 2022 33	Monaco	1–0	Nice	Monaco
19:00 CEST (UTC+2)	Tchouaméni (yellow card) 45'; Golovin 45+2', (yellow card) 78'; Disasi (yellow card) 52'; Martins (yellow card) 71'; Vanderson (yellow card) 81'	Report	Daniliuc (yellow card) 42'; Thuram (yellow card) 86'	Stadium: Stade Louis II; Attendance: 10,247; Referee: Benoît Millot

23 April 2022 34	Saint-Étienne	1–4	Monaco	Saint-Étienne
19:00 CEST (UTC+2)	Khazri 42' (pen.), (yellow card) 43'; Mangala (yellow card) 72'	Report	Martins (yellow card) 21'; Ben Yedder 23'; Volland 25'; Tchouaméni (yellow card) 40'; Kolodziejczak 61' (o.g.); Sidibé (yellow card) 65'; Boadu 77'	Stadium: Stade Geoffroy-Guichard; Attendance: 30,018; Referee: Bastien Dechepy

1 May 2022 35	Monaco	2–0	Angers	Monaco
15:00 CEST (UTC+2)	Volland (yellow card) 37'; Bamba 42' (o.g.); Ben Yedder 61'; Golovin (yellow card) 82'	Report	Doumbia (yellow card) 32'; Mangani (yellow card) 90+2'	Stadium: Stade Louis II; Attendance: 4,616; Referee: Hakim Ben El Hadj

6 May 2022 36	Lille	1–2	Monaco	Villeneuve-d'Ascq
21:00 CEST (UTC+2)	Çelik (yellow card) 39'; Fonte (yellow card) 51'; Gomes 69'; André (yellow card) 87'; Bamba (yellow card) 90'	Report	Tchouaméni 42', 75'; Ben Yedder (yellow card) 66'	Stadium: Stade Pierre-Mauroy; Attendance: 39,088; Referee: François Letexier

14 May 2022 37	Monaco	4–2	Brest	Monaco
21:00 CEST (UTC+2)	Ben Yedder 44' (pen.), 51', 54'; Golovin (yellow card) 45+3'; Volland (yellow card) 62', (goal) 70'	Report	Duverne 10'; Belaïli 23'; Hérelle (yellow card) 45+3'	Stadium: Stade Louis II; Attendance: 5,852; Referee: Jérôme Brisard

21 May 2022 38	Lens	2–2	Monaco	Lens
21:00 CEST (UTC+2)	Frankowski 30'; Danso (yellow card) 32'; Gradit (yellow card) 84'; Ganago 90+5'	Report	Badiashile 34'; Ben Yedder 62'; Volland (yellow card) 84'; Tchouaméni (yellow card) 86'; Caio Henrique (yellow card) 88'	Stadium: Stade Bollaert-Delelis; Attendance: 37,764; Referee: Benoît Bastien

=== Coupe de France ===
19 December 2021 Round of 64	Red Star	0–2	Monaco	Saint-Ouen-sur-Seine
13:45 CET (UTC+1)	Sparagna (yellow card) 51'; Nilor (yellow card) 83'	Report	Ben Yedder 33', 65'	Stadium: Stade Bauer; Attendance: 2,670; Referee: François Letexier

2 January 2022 Round of 32	Quevilly-Rouen	1–3	Monaco	Le Petit-Quevilly
18:30 CET (UTC+1)	Sidibé 43', (red card) 90+1'	Report	Matazo (yellow card) 25'; Ben Yedder 33' (pen.); Volland 37', 58'; Caio Henrique (yellow card) 70'	Stadium: Stade Robert Diochon; Attendance: 7,826; Referee: Stéphanie Frappart

30 January 2022 Round of 16	Lens	2–4	Monaco	Lens
21:00 CET (UTC+1)	Saïd 45'; Kalimuendo 53'	Report	Ben Yedder 18', 88'; Jean Lucas 27'; Diop 29'; Golovin (yellow card) 72'	Stadium: Stade Bollaert-Delelis; Attendance: 5,000; Referee: Eric Wattellier

8 February 2022 Quarter-finals	Monaco	2–0	Amiens	Monaco
21:00 CET (UTC+1)	Tchouaméni 5', (yellow card) 22'; Volland 54'	Report	Gene (yellow card) 11'; Badji (yellow card) 13'; Bénet (yellow card) 45'; Pavlović (yellow card) 60'	Stadium: Stade Louis II; Attendance: 2,128; Referee: Amaury Delerue

2 March 2022 Semi-finals	Nantes	2–2 (4–2 p)	Monaco	Nantes
21:15 CET (UTC+1)	Sidibé 21' (o.g.); Moutoussamy 74'	Report	Maripán 12'; Boadu 76'	Stadium: Stade de la Beaujoire; Attendance: 33,929; Referee: Benoît Bastien
	Penalties
	Kolo Muani (penalty scored); Merlin (penalty scored); Moutoussamy (penalty scored); Simon (penalty scored)		(penalty missed) Ben Yedder; (penalty scored) Disasi; (penalty missed) Tchouaméni; (penalty scored) Volland

=== UEFA Champions League ===
==== Third qualifying round ====
The draw for the third qualifying round was held on 19 July 2021.

3 August 2021 First leg	Sparta Prague (Czech Republic)	0–2	(France) Monaco	Prague, Czech Republic
19:00 CEST (UTC+2)	Polidar (yellow card) 17'; Pavelka (yellow card) 34'	Report	Fofana (yellow card) 5'; Badiashile (yellow card) 22'; Tchouaméni 37', (yellow card) 83'; Volland 59'	Stadium: Stadion Letná; Attendance: 10,533; Referee: Michael Oliver (England)

10 August 2021 Second leg	Monaco (France)	3–1 (5–1 agg.)	(Czech Republic) Sparta Prague	Monaco
20:00 CEST (UTC+2)	Tchouaméni (yellow card) 49'; Martins 50'; Golovin 56'; Diop 81'	Report	Wiesner (yellow card) 5'; Karlsson 78'; Pulkrab (yellow card) 88'	Stadium: Stade Louis II; Attendance: 5,476; Referee: Daniele Orsato (Italy)

==== Play-off round ====
The draw for the play-off round was held on 2 August 2021.

17 August 2021 First leg	Monaco (France)	0–1	(Ukraine) Shakhtar Donetsk	Monaco
21:00 CEST (UTC+2)		Report	Pedrinho 19'; Stepanenko (yellow card) 87'; Patrick (yellow card) 90'	Stadium: Stade Louis II; Attendance: 5,700; Referee: Danny Makkelie (Netherlands)

25 August 2021 Second leg	Shakhtar Donetsk (Ukraine)	2–2 (a.e.t.) (3–2 agg.)	(France) Monaco	Kharkiv, Ukraine
21:00 EEST (UTC+3)	Dodô (yellow card) 40'; Tetê (yellow card) 54'; Marlon (yellow card) 70'; Marlos 74'; Solomon (yellow card) 80'; Kryvtsov (yellow card) 105+1'; Fernando (yellow card) 113'; Aguilar 114' (o.g.)	Report	Volland (yellow card) 14'; Ben Yedder 18', 39'; Golovin (yellow card) 72'; Fofana (yellow card) 81'; Badiashile (yellow card) 107'	Stadium: OSC Metalist; Attendance: 26,697; Referee: Anthony Taylor (England)
Note: Match moved to the OSC Metalist in Kharkiv due to a concert dedicated to the Independence Day of Ukraine at the NSC Olimpiyskiy in Kyiv on 24 August.

=== UEFA Europa League ===
The draw for the UEFA Europa League group stage was held on 27 August, drawing Monaco with PSV Eindhoven, Real Sociedad and Sturm Graz.

==== Group stage ====
Pos	Team	Pld	W	D	L	GF	GA	GD	Pts	Qualification
1	(France) Monaco	6	3	3	0	7	4	+3	12	Advance to round of 16
2	(Spain) Real Sociedad	6	2	3	1	9	6	+3	9	Advance to knockout round play-offs
3	(Netherlands) PSV Eindhoven	6	2	2	2	9	8	+1	8	Transfer to Europa Conference League
4	(Austria) Sturm Graz	6	0	2	4	3	10	−7	2	

Source: UEFA
Rules for classification: Group stage tiebreakers

16 September 2021 1	Monaco (France)	1–0	(Austria) Sturm Graz	Monaco
21:00 CEST (UTC+2)	Jakobs (yellow card) 32'; Diatta 66'	Report	Wüthrich (yellow card) 64'; Prass (yellow card) 90+4'	Stadium: Stade Louis II; Attendance: 2,941; Referee: Donatas Rumšas (Lithuania)

30 September 2021 2	Real Sociedad (Spain)	1–1	(France) Monaco	San Sebastián, Spain
18:45 CEST (UTC+2)	Merino 53'; Elustondo (yellow card) 90+2'	Report	Disasi 16', (yellow card) 90+2'; Maripán (yellow card) 87'; Volland (yellow card) 90+2'	Stadium: Anoeta; Attendance: 23,765; Referee: Sergey Ivanov (Russia)

21 October 2021 3	PSV Eindhoven (Netherlands)	1–2	(France) Monaco	Eindhoven, Netherlands
21:00 CEST (UTC+2)	Gakpo (yellow card) 51', (goal) 59'; Carlos Vinícius (yellow card) 76'	Report	Boadu 20'; Diop 89'	Stadium: Philips Stadion; Attendance: 33,000; Referee: Davide Massa (Italy)

4 November 2021 4	Monaco (France)	0–0	(Netherlands) PSV Eindhoven	Monaco
18:45 CET (UTC+1)	Jean Lucas (yellow card) 18'; Maripán (yellow card) 27'	Report	Boscagli (yellow card) 66'	Stadium: Stade Louis II; Attendance: 5,840; Referee: Cüneyt Çakır (Turkey)

25 November 2021 5	Monaco (France)	2–1	(Spain) Real Sociedad	Monaco
21:00 CET (UTC+1)	Maripán (yellow card) 15'; Volland 28'; Golovin (yellow card) 33'; Fofana 38', (red card) 89'; Nübel (yellow card) 90+5'	Report	Isak 35'; Zaldúa (yellow card) 44'; Januzaj (yellow card) 58'; Zubimendi (yellow card) 75'	Stadium: Stade Louis II; Attendance: 3,834; Referee: Ivan Kružliak (Slovakia)

9 December 2021 6	Sturm Graz (Austria)	1–1	(France) Monaco	Graz, Austria
18:45 CET (UTC+1)	Jantscher 7' (pen.); Prass (yellow card) 63'	Report	Pavlović (yellow card) 6'; Volland 30'; Aguilar (yellow card) 32'; Golovin (yellow card) 54'	Stadium: Liebenauer Stadium; Attendance: 0 Referee: Mohammed Al-Hakim (Sweden)
Note: Match played behind closed doors.

==== Knockout phase ====
===== Round of 16 =====
The draw for the round of 16 was held on 25 February 2022.

10 March 2022 First leg	Braga (Portugal)	2–0	(France) Monaco	Braga, Portugal
21:00 CET (UTC+1)	Ruiz 3'; Carmo (yellow card) 53'; Vitinha 89'	Report	Vanderson (yellow card) 14'	Stadium: Estádio Municipal; Attendance: 10,228; Referee: Felix Zwayer (Germany)

17 March 2022 Second leg	Monaco (France)	1–1 (1–3 agg.)	(Portugal) Braga	Monaco
18:45 CET (UTC+1)	Jean Lucas (yellow card) 40'; Golovin (yellow card) 62'; Maripán (yellow card) 86'; Disasi 90'	Report	Ruiz 20'	Stadium: Stade Louis II; Attendance: 3,892; Referee: Andreas Ekberg (Sweden)

== Statistics ==
=== Appearances and goals ===
No.	Pos	Nat	Player	Total		Ligue 1		Coupe de France		UEFA Champions League		UEFA Europa League	
No.	Pos	Nat	Player	Apps	Goals	Apps	Goals	Apps	Goals	Apps	Goals	Apps	Goals
1	GK	(Poland) POL	Radosław Majecki	4	0	0	0	2	0	1	0	1	0
2	DF	(Brazil) BRA	Vanderson	22	2	12+5	2	1+2	0	0	0	2	0
3	DF	(Chile) CHI	Guillermo Maripán	37	1	21+5	0	2+1	1	2	0	4+2	0
4	MF	(Spain) ESP	Cesc Fàbregas	5	0	0+2	0	0	0	0+2	0	0+1	0
5	DF	(France) FRA	Benoît Badiashile	34	1	21+3	1	0	0	4	0	5+1	0
6	DF	(France) FRA	Axel Disasi	45	3	30+2	1	4	0	2+1	0	5+1	2
7	MF	(Portugal) POR	Gelson Martins	47	5	24+8	4	3+2	0	4	1	3+3	0
8	MF	(France) FRA	Aurélien Tchouaméni	50	5	33+2	3	4	1	4	1	7	0
9	FW	(Netherlands) NED	Myron Boadu	42	6	7+24	4	2+1	1	0+1	0	3+4	1
10	FW	(France) FRA	Wissam Ben Yedder	52	32	29+8	25	4	5	4	2	4+3	0
11	MF	(Brazil) BRA	Jean Lucas	39	2	18+10	1	2	1	0+2	0	6+1	0
12	DF	(Brazil) BRA	Caio Henrique	49	2	31+3	2	3	0	4	0	7+1	0
14	MF	(Germany) GER	Ismail Jakobs	39	0	10+18	0	3+2	0	0+3	0	1+2	0
16	GK	(Germany) GER	Alexander Nübel	49	0	38	0	1	0	3	0	7	0
17	MF	(Russia) RUS	Aleksandr Golovin	40	4	17+10	3	1+1	0	4	1	2+5	0
19	DF	(France) FRA	Djibril Sidibé	26	0	12+5	0	2+1	0	3	0	2+1	0
21	DF	(Serbia) SRB	Strahinja Pavlović	11	0	5+2	0	1	0	0	0	2+1	0
22	MF	(France) FRA	Youssouf Fofana	46	1	23+10	0	2+2	0	4	0	4+1	1
26	DF	(France) FRA	Ruben Aguilar	39	0	22+6	0	3	0	1+1	0	4+2	0
27	MF	(Senegal) SEN	Krépin Diatta	13	2	3+5	1	0	0	0+2	0	2+1	1
30	GK	(Italy) ITA	Vito Mannone	2	0	0	0	2	0	0	0	0	0
31	FW	(Germany) GER	Kevin Volland	51	15	29+5	9	4+1	3	4	1	7+1	2
33	MF	(Portugal) POR	Tiago Ribeiro	1	0	0+1	0	0	0	0	0	0	0
34	DF	(France) FRA	Chrislain Matsima	13	0	1+6	0	2+1	0	0	0	2+1	0
35	MF	(France) FRA	Maghnes Akliouche	8	0	0+6	0	1+1	0	0	0	0	0
36	MF	(Belgium) BEL	Eliot Matazo	29	0	9+10	0	2+2	0	0+1	0	3+2	0
37	MF	(France) FRA	Sofiane Diop	45	9	24+6	6	2+2	1	0+4	1	3+4	1
38	DF	(France) FRA	Yllan Okou	1	0	0	0	1	0	0	0	0	0
	MF	(France) FRA	Soungoutou Magassa	1	0	0	0	0+1	0	0	0	0	0
	MF	(France) FRA	Félix Lemaréchal	3	0	0+2	0	1	0	0	0	0	0
Players away from the club on loan:
25	FW	(Netherlands) NED	Anthony Musaba	1	0	0	0	0	0	0+1	0	0	0
Players who left Monaco during the season:
39	FW	(France) FRA	Wilson Isidor	9	0	0+4	0	0+2	0	0+1	0	2	0

=== Goalscorers ===
As of match played 21 May 2022

Place	Position	Nation	Number	Name	Ligue 1	Coupe de France	UEFA Champions League	UEFA Europa League	Total
1	FW	(France)	10	Wissam Ben Yedder	25	5	2	0	32
2	FW	(Germany)	31	Kevin Volland	9	3	1	2	15
3	MF	(France)	37	Sofiane Diop	6	1	1	1	9
4	FW	(Netherlands)	9	Myron Boadu	4	1	0	1	6
5	MF	(Portugal)	7	Gelson Martins	4	0	1	0	5
5	FW	(France)	8	Aurélien Tchouaméni	3	1	1	0	5
7	MF	(Russia)	17	Aleksandr Golovin	3	0	1	0	4
8	DF	(France)	6	Axel Disasi	1	0	0	2	3
8				Own goal	3	0	0	0	3
10	DF	(Brazil)	12	Caio Henrique	2	0	0	0	2
10	DF	(Brazil)	2	Vanderson	2	0	0	0	2
10	MF	(Senegal)	27	Krépin Diatta	1	0	0	1	2
10	MF	(Brazil)	11	Jean Lucas	1	1	0	0	2
14	DF	(France)	5	Benoît Badiashile	1	0	0	0	1
14	DF	(Chile)	3	Guillermo Maripán	0	1	0	0	1
14	MF	(France)	22	Youssouf Fofana	0	0	0	1	1
				TOTALS	65	13	7	8	93

=== Clean sheets ===
As of match played 21 May 2022

Place	Position	Nation	Number	Name	Ligue 1	Coupe de France	UEFA Champions League	UEFA Europa League	Total
1	GK	(Germany)	16	Alexander Nübel	11	0	1	2	14
2	GK	(Poland)	1	Radosław Majecki	0	1	0	0	1
2	GK	(Italy)	30	Vito Mannone	0	1	0	0	1
				TOTALS	11	2	1	2	16

=== Disciplinary record ===
As of match played 14 May 2022

N	P	Nat.	Name	Ligue 1			Coupe de France			UEFA Champions League			UEFA Europa League			Total			Notes
N	P	Nat.	Name	Yellow card	Second yellow card	Red card	Yellow card	Second yellow card	Red card	Yellow card	Second yellow card	Red card	Yellow card	Second yellow card	Red card	Yellow card	Second yellow card	Red card	Notes
2	DF	(Brazil)	Vanderson	3									1			4			
3	DF	(Chile)	Guillermo Maripán	5									4			9			
5	DF	(France)	Benoît Badiashile	4						2						6			
6	DF	(France)	Axel Disasi	5									1			6			
7	MF	(Portugal)	Gelson Martins	4												4			
8	MF	(France)	Aurélien Tchouaméni	10	1		1			2						13	1		
10	FW	(France)	Wissam Ben Yedder	3												3			
11	MF	(Brazil)	Jean Lucas	2	1								2			4	1		
12	DF	(Brazil)	Caio Henrique	5			1									6			
14	MF	(Germany)	Ismail Jakobs	1									1			2			
16	GK	(Germany)	Alexander Nübel										1			1			
17	MF	(Russia)	Aleksandr Golovin	4		1	1			1			3			9		1	
19	DF	(France)	Djibril Sidibé	6												6			
21	DF	(Serbia)	Strahinja Pavlović	3	1								1			4	1		
22	MF	(France)	Youssouf Fofana	4						2					1	6		1	
26	DF	(France)	Ruben Aguilar	4						1			1			6			
31	FW	(Germany)	Kevin Volland	10						1			1			12			
35	MF	(France)	Maghnes Akliouche	1												1			
36	MF	(Belgium)	Eliot Matazo	1			1									2			
37	MF	(France)	Sofiane Diop	6						1						7			
Players away on loan:
Players who left Monaco during the season:

Source: Match reports in Competitive matches
Only competitive matches
(yellow card) = Number of bookings; (second yellow card) = Number of sending offs after a second yellow card; (red card) = Number of sending offs by a direct red card.
