= 2022–23 AS Monaco FC season =

Monaco
2022–23 season
- President: Dmitry Rybolovlev
- Head coach: Philippe Clement
- Stadium: Stade Louis II
- Ligue 1: 6th
- Coupe de France: Round of 64
- UEFA Champions League: Third qualifying round
- UEFA Europa League: Knockout round play-offs
- Top goalscorer: League: Wissam Ben Yedder (19); All: Wissam Ben Yedder (25)
Home colours	Away colours	Third colours

The 2022–23 season was the 98th season in the history of AS Monaco FC and their 10th consecutive season in the top flight. The club participated in Ligue 1, the Coupe de France, the UEFA Champions League and the UEFA Europa League.

== Players ==
=== First-team squad ===
As of 5 January 2023

No.	Pos.	Nation	Player
2	DF	BRA	Vanderson
3	DF	CHI	Guillermo Maripán
4	MF	MLI	Mohamed Camara
6	DF	FRA	Axel Disasi
9	FW	NED	Myron Boadu
10	FW	FRA	Wissam Ben Yedder (captain)
11	MF	BRA	Jean Lucas
12	DF	BRA	Caio Henrique
14	DF	SEN	Ismail Jakobs
15	MF	BEL	Eliot Matazo
16	GK	GER	Alexander Nübel (on loan from Bayern Munich)
17	MF	RUS	Aleksandr Golovin
18	MF	JPN	Takumi Minamino
19	MF	FRA	Youssouf Fofana

No.	Pos.	Nation	Player
21	MF	FRA	Maghnes Akliouche
23	DF	FRA	Malang Sarr (on loan from Chelsea)
26	DF	FRA	Ruben Aguilar
27	FW	SEN	Krépin Diatta
30	GK	FRA	Thomas Didillon (on loan from Cercle Brugge)
31	FW	GER	Kevin Volland
34	DF	FRA	Chrislain Matsima
36	FW	SUI	Breel Embolo
41	MF	FRA	Soungoutou Magassa
42	MF	FRA	Edan Diop
44	MF	FRA	Eliesse Ben Seghir
50	GK	FRA	Yann Lienard
77	MF	POR	Gelson Martins
99	DF	FRA	Yllan Okou

== Transfers ==
=== In ===
No.	Pos.	Player	Transferred from	Fee	Date	Source
	GK	(France) Benjamin Lecomte	(Spain) Atlético Madrid	Loan return	30 June 2022	
21	DF	(Serbia) Strahinja Pavlović	(Switzerland) Basel	Loan return	30 June 2022	
	DF	(Italy) Antonio Barreca	(Italy) Lecce	Loan return	30 June 2022	
	MF	(Ivory Coast) Jean-Eudes Aholou	(France) Strasbourg	Loan return	30 June 2022	
19	FW	(Italy) Pietro Pellegri	(Italy) Torino	Loan return	30 June 2022	
53	FW	(France) Willem Geubbels	(France) Nantes	Loan return	30 June 2022	
25	FW	(Netherlands) Anthony Musaba	(Netherlands) Heerenveen	Loan return	30 June 2022	
18	MF	(Japan) Takumi Minamino	(England) Liverpool	€17.8M	1 July 2022	
36	FW	(Switzerland) Breel Embolo	(Germany) Borussia Mönchengladbach	€12.5M	15 July 2022	
30	GK	(France) Thomas Didillon	(Belgium) Cercle Brugge	Loan	20 July 2022	
23	DF	(France) Malang Sarr	(England) Chelsea	Loan (Note: Includes an option to sign permanently.)	10 August 2022	
4	MF	(Mali) Mohamed Camara	(Austria) Red Bull Salzburg	€15M	14 August 2022	
	FW	(Netherlands) Anthony Musaba	(France) Metz	Loan return	3 January 2023	
	GK	(France) Benjamin Lecomte	(Spain) Espanyol	Loan return	25 January 2023	
	DF	(France) Arthur Zagré	(Netherlands) Utrecht	Loan return	30 January 2023	

=== Out ===
No.	Pos.	Player	Transferred to	Fee	Date	Source
30	GK	(Italy) Vito Mannone	(France) Lorient	End of contract	1 July 2022	
19	DF	(France) Djibril Sidibé	(Greece) AEK Athens	End of contract	1 July 2022	
21	DF	(Serbia) Strahinja Pavlović	(Austria) Red Bull Salzburg	€7M	1 July 2022	
8	MF	(France) Aurélien Tchouaméni	(Spain) Real Madrid	€80M	1 July 2022	
4	MF	(Spain) Cesc Fàbregas	(Italy) Como	End of contract	1 July 2022	
	MF	(Ivory Coast) Jean-Eudes Aholou	(France) Strasbourg	€3M	1 July 2022	
19	FW	(Italy) Pietro Pellegri	(Italy) Torino	€5M	1 July 2022	
40	GK	(France) Benjamin Lecomte	(Spain) Espanyol	Loan	13 July 2022	
1	GK	(Poland) Radoslaw Majecki	(Belgium) Cercle Brugge	Loan	20 July 2022	
	MF	(Guinea-Bissau) Pelé	(Portugal) Famalicão	Loan	5 August 2022	
34	DF	(France) Chrislain Matsima	(France) Lorient	Loan (Note: Includes an option to sign permanently.)	16 August 2022	
	DF	(France) Jean Marcelin	(Belgium) Cercle Brugge	Loan	23 August 2022	
	DF	(Italy) Antonio Barreca	Released (Note: On 25 August 2022, Barreca joined Cagliari.)	Free	25 August 2022	
25	FW	(Netherlands) Anthony Musaba	(France) Metz	Loan (Note: Includes an option to sign permanently.)	29 August 2022	
7	MF	(France) Sofiane Diop	(France) Nice	€22M	29 August 2022	
	FW	(Netherlands) Anthony Musaba	(Netherlands) NEC Nijmegen	Loan	4 January 2023	
5	DF	(France) Benoît Badiashile	(England) Chelsea	€38M	5 January 2023	
13	FW	(France) Willem Geubbels	Released (Note: On 23 January 2023, Geubbels joined St. Gallen.)	Free	23 January 2023	
	GK	(France) Benjamin Lecomte	(France) Montpellier	€2M	26 January 2023	
37	MF	(France) Félix Lemaréchal	(France) Brest	Loan	31 January 2023	
	DF	(France) Arthur Zagré	(Netherlands) Excelsior	Loan	31 January 2023	

== Pre-season and friendlies ==
Win Draw Loss Fixtures

25 June 2022 Friendly	Monaco	1–0	Cercle Brugge	La Turbie
11:00 CEST (UTC+2)	Musaba 18'	Report

29 June 2022 Friendly	Monaco	1–1	St. Gallen	La Turbie
18:00 CEST (UTC+2)	Jean Lucas 2'	Report	Babic 75'	Stadium: Stade Municipal

6 July 2022 Friendly	Monaco	2–2	Austria Wien	Lagos, Portugal
17:00 WEST (UTC+1)	Maripán 14'; Martins 16'	Report	Jukic 6'; Gruber 28'	Stadium: Estádio Municipal Fernando Cabrita

9 July 2022 Friendly	Portimonense	0–2	Monaco	Lagos, Portugal
17:00 WEST (UTC+1)		Report	Ben Yedder 43'; Fofana 89'	Stadium: Estádio Municipal Fernando Cabrita

16 July 2022 Friendly	Inter Milan	2–2	Monaco	Ferrara, Italy
19:30 WEST (UTC+1)	Gagliardini 42'; Asllani 59'	Report	Golovin 7'; Ben Yedder 30'	Stadium: Stadio Paolo Mazza; Referee: Matteo Marcenaro (Italy)

23 July 2022 Friendly	Porto	2–1	Monaco	Porto, Portugal
20:00 WEST (UTC+1)	Marcano (yellow card) 28'; Taremi 67' (pen.); Galeno 71'; Otávio (yellow card) 90+5'	Report	Minamino (yellow card) 44'; Maripán (yellow card) 54'; Ben Yedder 90' (pen.)	Stadium: Estádio do Dragão

27 July 2022 Friendly	Southampton	3–1	Monaco	Southampton, England
19:45 BST (UTC+1)	A. Armstrong 52'; S. Armstrong 73'; Ward-Prowse 88'	Report	Golovin 39'	Stadium: St Mary's Stadium; Attendance: 8,317

7 December 2022 Friendly	Sevilla	1–1	Monaco	Seville, Spain
20:00 CET (UTC+1)	Álvarez (yellow card) 69'; Ortiz 73'	Report	Martins 59'	Stadium: Ramón Sánchez Pizjuán; Referee: Jorge Figueroa Vázquez (Spain)

16 December 2022 Friendly	Empoli	0–1	Monaco	Empoli, Italy
17:00 CET (UTC+1)	Ismajli (yellow card) 24'; Luperto (yellow card) 83'		Diop 44'	Stadium: Stadio Carlo Castellani

21 December 2022 Friendly	Leeds United	2–4	Monaco	Leeds, England
19:00 GMT	Koch 12'; Gelhardt 90+3' (pen.)		Embolo 25', 54'; Martins 47'; Jakobs 52', (yellow card) 77'	Stadium: Elland Road; Attendance: 20,978; Referee: Andrew Madley

== Competitions ==
=== Overall record ===
Competition	First match	Last match	Starting round	Final position	Record							
Competition	First match	Last match	Starting round	Final position	Pld	W	D	L	GF	GA	GD	Win %
Ligue 1	6 August 2022	3 June 2023	Matchday 1	6th	38	19	8	11	70	58	+12	50.00
Coupe de France	7 January 2023		Round of 64	Round of 64	1	0	1	0	2	2	+0	0.00
UEFA Champions League	2 August 2022	9 August 2022	Third qualifying round	Third qualifying round	2	0	1	1	3	4	−1	0.00
UEFA Europa League	8 September 2022	23 February 2023	Group stage	Knockout round play-offs	8	4	1	3	14	13	+1	50.00
Total					49	23	11	15	89	77	+12	46.94

Source: Soccerway

=== Ligue 1 ===
==== League table ====
Pos	Team	Pld	W	D	L	GF	GA	GD	Pts	Qualification or relegation
4	Rennes	38	21	5	12	69	39	+30	68	Qualification for the Europa League group stage
5	Lille	38	19	10	9	65	44	+21	67	Qualification for the Europa Conference League play-off round
6	Monaco	38	19	8	11	70	58	+12	65	
7	Lyon	38	18	8	12	65	47	+18	62	
8	Clermont	38	17	8	13	45	49	−4	59	

Source: Ligue 1
Rules for classification: 1) Points; 2) Goal difference; 3) Head-to-head points; 4) Head-to-head goal difference; 5) Head-to-head goals scored; 6) Head-to-head away goals scored; 7) Goals scored; 8) Away goals scored; 9) Fair-play points (Note: Head-to-head record is used only after all the matches between the teams in question have been played).

==== Results summary ====
Overall								Home						Away					
Pld	W	D	L	GF	GA	GD	Pts	W	D	L	GF	GA	GD	W	D	L	GF	GA	GD
38	19	8	11	70	58	+12	65	9	3	7	37	33	+4	10	5	4	33	25	+8

Source: Ligue 1

==== Results by round ====
Round	1	2	3	4	5	6	7	8	9	10	11	12	13	14	15	16	17	18	19	20	21	22	23	24	25	26	27	28	29	30	31	32	33	34	35	36	37	38
Ground	A	H	H	A	H	A	H	A	H	A	H	A	H	A	H	A	H	A	H	A	H	A	H	A	H	A	H	A	H	A	H	A	H	A	H	A	A	H
Result	W	D	L	D	L	W	W	W	W	W	D	L	W	W	L	W	W	D	W	D	W	W	W	W	L	D	L	W	W	D	W	L	L	W	D	L	L	L
Position	6	6	11	12	16	10	7	5	5	5	6	7	6	5	6	5	5	5	4	4	4	4	3	3	3	3	4	4	4	4	4	4	4	4	4	4	6	6

Source: Ligue 1
A = Away; H = Home; W = Win; D = Draw; L = Loss

==== Matches ====
The league fixtures were announced on 17 June 2022.

6 August 2022 1	Strasbourg	1–2	Monaco	Strasbourg
17:00 CEST (UTC+2)	Diallo 65'	Report	Diatta 43', (yellow card) 83'; Diop 53'; Fofana (yellow card) 80'	Stadium: Stade de la Meinau; Attendance: 25,359; Referee: François Letexier

13 August 2022 2	Monaco	1–1	Rennes	Monaco
17:00 CEST (UTC+2)	Fofana (red card) 15'; Disasi (penalty missed) 33'; Embolo 72'	Report	Rodon (yellow card) 21'; Theate (yellow card) 23'; Mandanda (yellow card) 31'; Laborde 59'	Stadium: Stade Louis II; Attendance: 8,000; Referee: Jérémie Pignard

20 August 2022 3	Monaco	1–4	Lens	Monaco
17:00 CEST (UTC+2)	Embolo (yellow card) 40'; Badiashile 41'; Vanderson (yellow card) 58' (yellow-red card) 72'; Ben Yedder (yellow card) 68'	Report	Openda 7'; Machado 38'; Fofana 55' (pen.); Saïd 78'	Stadium: Stade Louis II; Attendance: 8,700; Referee: Willy Delajod

28 August 2022 4	Paris Saint-Germain	1–1	Monaco	Paris
20:45 CEST (UTC+2)	Neymar (yellow card) 5', (goal) 70' (pen.); Kimpembe (yellow card) 77'; Verratti (yellow card) 86'; Hakimi (yellow card) 90+5'	Report	Volland 20'; Akliouche (yellow card) 40'; Camara (yellow card) 55'; Badiashile (yellow card) 90+1'; Caio Henrique (yellow card) 90+5'	Stadium: Parc des Princes; Attendance: 46,000; Referee: Benoît Bastien

31 August 2022 5	Monaco	2–4	Troyes	Monaco
19:00 CEST (UTC+2)	Maripán 10', (yellow card) 21' (yellow-red card) 44'; Aguilar (yellow card) 48'; Fofana 63'	Report	Tardieu 22' (pen.); Odobert 45+3'; M. Baldé 48'; Palmer-Brown (yellow card) 58'; Salmier 78'	Stadium: Stade Louis II; Attendance: 4,045; Referee: Ruddy Buquet

4 September 2022 6	Nice	0–1	Monaco	Nice
20:45 CEST (UTC+2)	Rosario (yellow card) 50'; Lotomba (yellow card) 90+4'	Report	Camara (yellow card) 38'; Embolo 69'	Stadium: Allianz Riviera; Attendance: 24,125; Referee: Benoît Millot

11 September 2022 7	Monaco	2–1	Lyon	Monaco
20:45 CEST (UTC+2)	Badiashile 55'; Maripán 63'; Golovin (yellow card) 86'	Report	Lukeba (yellow card) 65'; Lacazette (yellow card) 79'; Toko Ekambi 81'	Stadium: Stade Louis II; Attendance: 7,000; Referee: Clément Turpin

18 September 2022 8	Reims	0–3	Monaco	Reims
13:00 CEST (UTC+2)	Busi (yellow card) 19'; Locko (red card) 22'; Munetsi (yellow card) 38'; Lopy (yellow card) 45+1'	Report	Golovin 47'; Akliouche (yellow card) 50'; Nübel (yellow card) 84'; Minamino 87'; Ben Yedder 90'	Stadium: Stade Auguste Delaune; Attendance: 10,000; Referee: Marc Bollengier

2 October 2022 9	Monaco	4–1	Nantes	Monaco
17:05 CEST (UTC+2)	Embolo 2'; Ben Yedder 6', 28', 62' (pen.)	Report	Girotto (yellow card) 60'; Caio Henrique 80' (o.g.)	Stadium: Stade Louis II; Attendance: 5,202; Referee: Thomas Léonard

9 October 2022 10	Montpellier	0–2	Monaco	Montpellier
13:00 CEST (UTC+2)	Estève (yellow card) 10'; Jullien (yellow card) 88'	Report	Caio Henrique (yellow card) 26'; Embolo 45+1'; Badiashile (yellow card) 65'; Camara (yellow card) 71'; Boadu 80'	Stadium: Stade de la Mosson; Attendance: 13,048; Referee: Benoît Millot

16 October 2022 11	Monaco	1–1	Clermont	Monaco
17:05 CEST (UTC+2)	Camara (red card) 14'; Embolo (penalty missed) 31', 31'; Jakobs (yellow card) 87'; Diatta (yellow card) 90+1'; Nübel (yellow card) 90+4'	Report	Rashani (yellow card) 48'; Andrić 53'; Khaoui (yellow card) 63'; Magnin (yellow card) 67'; Seidu (yellow card) 87'	Stadium: Stade Louis II; Attendance: 4,731; Referee: Ruddy Buquet

23 October 2022 12	Lille	4–3	Monaco	Villeneuve-d'Ascq
20:45 CEST (UTC+2)	Alexsandro 22'; Cabella 39', 62'; Bamba (yellow card) 50', (goal) 71'	Report	Matazo (yellow card) 21'; Caio Henrique 34'; Disasi 44'; Ben Yedder 53'; Badiashile (yellow card) 58'	Stadium: Stade Pierre-Mauroy; Attendance: 35,362; Referee: Willy Delajod

30 October 2022 13	Monaco	2–0	Angers	Monaco
15:00 CET (UTC+1)	Sarr (yellow card) 25'; Ben Yedder (penalty missed) 41'; Minamino (yellow card) 45+2'; Embolo 54'; Golovin 70'; Disasi (yellow card) 84'	Report	Hunou (yellow card) 19'; Bamba (yellow card) 57'; Mendy (yellow card) 85'	Stadium: Stade Louis II; Attendance: 7,069; Referee: Stéphanie Frappart

6 November 2022 14	Toulouse	0–2	Monaco	Toulouse
15:00 CET (UTC+1)		Report	Golovin 46'; Embolo 60'; Akliouche (yellow card) 90+2'	Stadium: Stadium de Toulouse; Attendance: 23,005; Referee: Benoît Millot

13 November 2022 15	Monaco	2–3	Marseille	Monaco
20:45 CET (UTC+1)	Ben Yedder 45' (pen.); Volland 72'; Embolo (yellow card) 82'; Disasi (yellow card) 85'; Fofana (yellow card) 90+5'	Report	Sánchez 35', (yellow card) 78'; Veretout 83'; Kolašinac 90+8'	Stadium: Stade Louis II; Attendance: 10,631; Referee: Benoît Bastien

28 December 2022 16	Auxerre	2–3	Monaco	Auxerre
17:00 CET (UTC+1)	Niang 30' (pen.); Jeanvier (yellow card) 34'; Fofana 60' (o.g.)	Report	Ben Yedder 45+3' (pen.); Ben Seghir 58', 85'	Stadium: Stade de l'Abbé-Deschamps; Attendance: 16,503; Referee: Marc Bollengier

1 January 2023 17	Monaco	1–0	Brest	Monaco
15:00 CET (UTC+1)	Ben Seghir (yellow card) 40'; Golovin 55', (yellow card) 77'; Sarr (yellow card) 90+5'	Report	Fadiga (yellow card) 25'; Slimani (yellow card) 69'; Lage (yellow card) 76'; Lees-Melou (yellow card) 77'	Stadium: Stade Louis II; Attendance: 6,150; Referee: Jérémy Stinat

11 January 2023 18	Lorient	2–2	Monaco	Lorient
21:00 CET (UTC+1)	Innocent (yellow card) 42'; Ouattara 75'; Moffi 77'	Report	Caio Henrique (yellow card) 37'; Embolo 61'; Ben Yedder 90+3'	Stadium: Stade du Moustoir; Attendance: 14,521; Referee: Jérôme Brisard

15 January 2023 19	Monaco	7–1	Ajaccio	Monaco
17:05 CET (UTC+1)	Disasi 2'; Diatta 6'; Camara (yellow card) 20'; Ben Yedder 21', 28', 35' (pen.); Embolo 63', 89'	Report	Belaïli 11'; Diallo (yellow card) 33'; Mangani (yellow card) 46'	Stadium: Stade Louis II; Attendance: 8,000; Referee: Ruddy Buquet

28 January 2023 20	Marseille	1–1	Monaco	Marseille
21:00 CET (UTC+1)	Sánchez 47'; Veretout (yellow card) 66'; Rongier (yellow card) 85'	Report	Veretout 17' (o.g.); Diatta (yellow card) 54'; Golovin (yellow card) 90+3'	Stadium: Stade Vélodrome; Attendance: 64,502; Referee: Jérémie Pignard

1 February 2023 21	Monaco	3–2	Auxerre	Monaco
21:00 CET (UTC+1)	Ben Yedder 11'; Ben Seghir 30'; Embolo 82'	Report	Abline 68'; Da Costa 84'	Stadium: Stade Louis II; Attendance: 3,561; Referee: Eric Wattellier

5 February 2023 22	Clermont	0–2	Monaco	Clermont-Ferrand
13:00 CET (UTC+1)	Khaoui (yellow card) 84'	Report	Maripán 3'; Embolo 13'; Aguilar (yellow card) 75'; Minamino (yellow card) 85'	Stadium: Stade Gabriel Montpied; Attendance: 11,598; Referee: Marc Bollengier

11 February 2023 23	Monaco	3–1	Paris Saint-Germain	Monaco
17:00 CET (UTC+1)	Golovin 4'; Ben Yedder 18', 45+2'	Report	Zaïre-Emery 39'; Hakimi (yellow card) 71'	Stadium: Stade Louis II; Attendance: 16,500; Referee: Clément Turpin

19 February 2023 24	Brest	1–2	Monaco	Brest
13:00 CET (UTC+1)	Belkebla (yellow card) 42'; Le Douaron 86'	Report	Golovin 39'; Ben Yedder (yellow card) 66'; Boadu 73'; Jakobs (yellow card) 90+5'	Stadium: Stade Francis-Le Blé; Attendance: 13,203; Referee: Hakim Ben El Hadj

26 February 2023 25	Monaco	0–3	Nice	Monaco
17:05 CET (UTC+1)		Report	Moffi 8', 26'; Ramsey (yellow card) 28'; Thuram 43'	Stadium: Stade Louis II; Attendance: 9,000; Referee: Benoît Bastien

5 March 2023 26	Troyes	2–2	Monaco	Troyes
13:00 CET (UTC+1)	Kouamé 31'; Igbo 90+1'	Report	Golovin (yellow card) 37'; Ben Yedder 80', 83'	Stadium: Stade de l'Aube; Attendance: 9,160; Referee: Stéphanie Frappart

12 March 2023 27	Monaco	0–1	Reims	Monaco
17:05 CET (UTC+1)	Sarr (yellow card) 64'	Report	Balogun 50'; Ito (yellow card) 61'; Cajuste (yellow card) 83'	Stadium: Stade Louis II; Attendance: 5,383; Referee: Thomas Léonard

19 March 2023 28	Ajaccio	0–2	Monaco	Ajaccio
13:00 CET (UTC+1)	Belaïli (yellow card) 2'; Diallo (yellow card) 14'; Bayala (red card) 53'	Report	Ben Yedder 27'; Maripán (yellow card) 49'; Diatta 84'	Stadium: Stade François Coty; Attendance: 7,198; Referee: Jérémy Stinat

2 April 2023 29	Monaco	4–3	Strasbourg	Monaco
17:05 CEST (UTC+2)	Vanderson 19'; Camara (yellow card) 40'; Fofana (yellow card) 45+3' (yellow-red card) 78', (goal) 65'; Ben Seghir 54'; Diop 58'	Report	Mothiba 32'; Maripán 41' (o.g.); Diarra (yellow card) 53'; Diallo 90+3'	Stadium: Stade Louis II; Attendance: 5,356; Referee: Willy Delajod

9 April 2023 30	Nantes	2–2	Monaco	Nantes
17:05 CEST (UTC+2)	Girotto (yellow card) 56'; Corchia (yellow card) 62'; Mohamed 65'; Blas 78', (yellow card) 79'	Report	Disasi 21'; Matazo 30'; Volland (yellow card) 87'	Stadium: Stade de la Beaujoire; Attendance: 30,050; Referee: Clément Turpin

16 April 2023 31	Monaco	3–1	Lorient	Monaco
17:05 CEST (UTC+2)	Diatta 14'; Golovin 27'; Volland 55'	Report	Silva (yellow card) 25'; Koné 86'	Stadium: Stade Louis II; Attendance: 6,930; Referee: Bastien Dechepy

22 April 2023 32	Lens	3–0	Monaco	Lens
21:00 CEST (UTC+2)	Openda 9', 16'; Thomasson 56'	Report	Maripán (yellow card) 22'; Ben Yedder (yellow card) 68'	Stadium: Stade Bollaert-Delelis; Attendance: 38,223; Referee: François Letexier

30 April 2023 33	Monaco	0–4	Montpellier	Monaco
13:00 CEST (UTC+2)	Ben Yedder (yellow card) 37'; Maripán (yellow card) 45+1'	Report	Nordin 28', 72'; Kouyaté (yellow card) 58'; Maouassa 65'; Mavididi 79'	Stadium: Stade Louis II; Attendance: 6,150; Referee: Marc Bollengier

7 May 2023 34	Angers	1–2	Monaco	Angers
13:00 CEST (UTC+2)	Sima 64'; Valery (yellow card) 85'; Niane (yellow card) 89'	Report	Golovin 45'; Disasi (yellow card) 55'; Boadu 60'; Camara (yellow card) 77'; Disasi (yellow card) 55'	Stadium: Stade Raymond Kopa; Attendance: 9,223; Referee: Jérémy Stinat

14 May 2023 35	Monaco	0–0	Lille	Monaco
17:05 CEST (UTC+2)		Report	Ang. Gomes (yellow card) 71'; Diakité (yellow card) 90+3'	Stadium: Stade Louis II; Attendance: 6,805; Referee: Benoît Bastien

19 May 2023 36	Lyon	3–1	Monaco	Décines-Charpieu
21:00 CEST (UTC+2)	Lacazette 38'; Caqueret 57'; Cherki 78'	Report	Ben Yedder 2' (pen.); Golovin (yellow card) 31'; Jakobs (yellow card) 55'; Vanderson (yellow card) 63'	Stadium: Parc Olympique Lyonnais; Attendance: 53,980; Referee: Benoît Millot

27 May 2023 37	Rennes	2–0	Monaco	Rennes
21:00 CEST (UTC+2)	Majer 52'; Gouiri 73'	Report	Vanderson (yellow card) 11'; Maripán (yellow card) 55'; Embolo (yellow card) 80'	Stadium: Roazhon Park; Attendance: 28,344; Referee: Clément Turpin

3 June 2023 38	Monaco	1–2	Toulouse	Monaco
21:00 CEST (UTC+2)	Aguilar (yellow card) 12'; Ben Yedder 78'	Report	Sierro (yellow card) 58'; Aboukhlal 70'; Healey 90+4', (yellow card) 90+5'	Stadium: Stade Louis II; Attendance: 5,670; Referee: Stéphanie Frappart

=== Coupe de France ===
7 January 2023 Round of 64	Monaco	2–2 (a.e.t.) (4–5 p)	Rodez	Monaco
18:00 CET (UTC+1)	Akliouche 23'; Magassa (yellow card) 26'; Ben Yedder 37'	Report	Mendes 42'; Boissier (yellow card) 49'; Depres (yellow card) 79'; Abdennour 80'	Stadium: Stade Louis II; Attendance: 1,000; Referee: Abdelatif Kherradji
	Penalties
	Ben Yedder (penalty scored); Disasi (penalty scored); Ben Seghir (penalty scored); Caio Henrique (penalty scored); Golovin (penalty missed); Magassa (penalty missed)		(penalty scored) Abdennour; (penalty scored) Danger; (penalty missed) Corredor; (penalty scored) Senaya; (penalty scored) Depres; (penalty scored) Pembélé

=== UEFA Champions League ===
==== Third qualifying round ====
The draw for the third qualifying round was held on 18 July 2022.

2 August 2022 First leg	Monaco (France)	1–1	(Netherlands) PSV Eindhoven	Monaco
20:00 CEST (UTC+2)	Matazo (yellow card) 3'; Jakobs (yellow card) 67'; Disasi 80'	Report	Veerman 38', (yellow card) 89'; Gutiérrez (yellow card) 87'	Stadium: Stade Louis II; Attendance: 10,802; Referee: Davide Massa (Italy)

9 August 2022 Second leg	PSV Eindhoven (Netherlands)	3–2 (a.e.t.) (4–3 agg.)	(France) Monaco	Eindhoven, Netherlands
20:30 CEST (UTC+2)	Til (yellow card) 7'; Veerman 21'; Sangaré (yellow card) 23'; Obispo (yellow card) 85'; Gutiérrez 89'; De Jong 109'; Ramalho (yellow card) 120+1'	Report	Golovin (yellow card) 36'; Maripán 58', (yellow card) 120'; Ben Yedder 70'; Vanderson (yellow card) 78'	Stadium: Philips Stadion; Attendance: 35,000; Referee: Jesús Gil Manzano (Spain)

=== UEFA Europa League ===
==== Group stage ====
The draw for the group stage was held on 26 August 2022.

Pos	Team	Pld	W	D	L	GF	GA	GD	Pts	Qualification	FER	MON	TRA	ZVE
1	(Hungary) Ferencváros	6	3	1	2	8	9	−1	10 (Note: Head to head points: Ferencváros 4, Monaco 1.)	Advance to round of 16	—	1–1	3–2	2–1
2	(France) Monaco	6	3	1	2	9	8	+1	10	Advance to knockout round play-offs	0–1	—	3–1	4–1
3	(Turkey) Trabzonspor	6	3	0	3	11	9	+2	9	Transfer to Europa Conference League	1–0	4–0	—	2–1
4	(Serbia) Red Star Belgrade	6	2	0	4	9	11	−2	6		4–1	0–1	2–1	—

Source: UEFA
Rules for classification: Group stage tiebreakers
Notes:

8 September 2022 1	Red Star Belgrade (Serbia)	0–1	(France) Monaco	Belgrade, Serbia
21:00 CEST (UTC+2)	Dragović (yellow card) 7'; Pešić (yellow card) 45'; Milunović (yellow card) 88'	Report	Badiashile (yellow card) 18'; Minamino (yellow card) 43'; Golovin (yellow card) 69'; Embolo 74' (pen.)	Stadium: Red Star Stadium; Attendance: 40,226; Referee: Harm Osmers (Germany)

15 September 2022 2	Monaco (France)	0–1	(Hungary) Ferencváros	Monaco
18:45 CEST (UTC+2)	Embolo (yellow card) 77'	Report	Bešić (yellow card) 69'; Vécsei 80'; Traoré (yellow card) 90+4'	Stadium: Stade Louis II; Attendance: 3,931; Referee: Espen Eskås (Norway)

6 October 2022 3	Monaco (France)	3–1	(Turkey) Trabzonspor	Monaco
18:45 CEST (UTC+2)	Ben Yedder 14', 45+2' (pen.); Vanderson (yellow card) 22'; Disasi 55'; Diatta (yellow card) 74'	Report	Denswil (yellow card) 4'; Gómez (red card) 11'; Bakasetas 72'	Stadium: Stade Louis II; Attendance: 5,050; Referee: Giorgi Kruashvili (Georgia)

13 October 2022 4	Trabzonspor (Turkey)	4–0	(France) Monaco	Trabzon, Turkey
22:00 TRT (UTC+3)	Bardhi (yellow card) 23', (goal) 57'; Djaniny (yellow card) 37'; Sarr 44' (o.g.); Vitor Hugo 48'; Denswil (yellow card) 51'; Siopis (yellow card) 67'; Trézéguet 69'	Report	Fofana (yellow card) 63'	Stadium: Şenol Güneş Sports Complex; Attendance: 24,343; Referee: Jakob Kehlet (Denmark)

27 October 2022 5	Ferencváros (Hungary)	1–1	(France) Monaco	Budapest, Hungary
21:00 CEST (UTC+2)	Botka (yellow card) 24'; Dibusz (yellow card) 32'; Laïdouni (yellow card) 80'; Zachariassen 81'; Bešić (yellow card) 90+3'	Report	Ben Yedder 31'; Camara (yellow card) 57'; Maripán (yellow card) 84'	Stadium: Ferencváros Stadion; Attendance: 20,517; Referee: Enea Jorgji (Albania)

3 November 2022 6	Monaco (France)	4–1	(Serbia) Red Star Belgrade	Monaco
18:45 CET (UTC+1)	Volland 5', 27', 87'; Rodić 50' (o.g.); Badiashile (yellow card) 54'	Report	Rodić (yellow card) 23'; Katai (yellow card) 38'; Kanga 54' (pen.), (yellow card) 64'; Srnić (yellow card) 62'	Stadium: Stade Louis II; Attendance: 6,341; Referee: Serdar Gözübüyük (Netherlands)

==== Knockout phase ====
===== Knockout round play-offs =====
The draw for the knockout round play-offs was held on 7 November 2022.

16 February 2023 First leg	Bayer Leverkusen (Germany)	2–3	(France) Monaco	Leverkusen, Germany
21:00 CET (UTC+1)	Tapsoba (yellow card) 14'; Diaby 48'; Wirtz (yellow card) 50', (goal) 59'; Adli (yellow card) 64'	Report	Hradecky 9' (o.g.); Camara (yellow card) 63'; Diatta 74', (yellow card) 90+7'; Maripán (yellow card) 84'; Disasi 90+2'	Stadium: BayArena; Attendance: 27,864; Referee: Orel Grinfeld (Israel)

23 February 2023 Second leg	Monaco (France)	2–3 (a.e.t.) (5–5 agg.) (3–5 p)	(Germany) Bayer Leverkusen	Monaco
18:45 CET (UTC+1)	Ben Yedder 19' (pen.); Fofana (yellow card) 41'; Embolo 84'; Caio Henrique (yellow card) 119'; Jakobs (yellow card) 120'	Report	Wirtz 13'; Palacios 21', (yellow card) 99'; Adli 58'; Andrich (yellow card) 65'	Stadium: Stade Louis II; Attendance: 8,504; Referee: Alejandro Hernández Hernández (Spain)
	Penalties
	Disasi (penalty scored); Matazo (penalty missed); Embolo (penalty scored); Volland (penalty scored)		(penalty scored) Azmoun; (penalty scored) Amiri; (penalty scored) Tapsoba; (penalty scored) Schick; (penalty scored) Diaby

== Statistics ==
=== Appearances and goals ===
No.	Pos	Nat	Player	Total		Ligue 1		Coupe de France		UEFA Champions League		UEFA Europa League	
No.	Pos	Nat	Player	Apps	Goals	Apps	Goals	Apps	Goals	Apps	Goals	Apps	Goals
Goalkeepers
16	GK	(Germany) GER	Alexander Nübel	48	0	38	0	0	0	2	0	8	0
30	GK	(France) FRA	Thomas Didillon	1	0	0	0	1	0	0	0	0	0
Defenders
2	DF	(Brazil) BRA	Vanderson	39	1	24+7	1	0	0	2	0	5+1	0
3	DF	(Chile) CHI	Guillermo Maripán	33	4	25+1	3	0	0	2	1	4+1	0
6	DF	(France) FRA	Axel Disasi	49	6	37+1	3	1	0	2	1	8	2
12	DF	(Brazil) BRA	Caio Henrique	45	1	32+3	1	0+1	0	0+1	0	8	0
14	DF	(Senegal) SEN	Ismail Jakobs	41	0	9+23	0	1	0	2	0	0+6	0
23	DF	(France) FRA	Malang Sarr	17	0	8+5	0	1	0	0	0	3	0
26	DF	(France) FRA	Ruben Aguilar	23	0	14+6	0	1	0	0	0	1+1	0
34	DF	(France) FRA	Chrislain Matsima	8	0	5+3	0	0	0	0	0	0	0
99	DF	(France) FRA	Yllan Okou	0	0	0	0	0	0	0	0	0	0
Midfielders
4	MF	(Mali) MLI	Mohamed Camara	37	0	25+4	0	0	0	0	0	8	0
11	MF	(Brazil) BRA	Jean Lucas	10	0	3+3	0	0	0	0+1	0	0+3	0
15	MF	(Belgium) BEL	Eliot Matazo	29	1	13+10	1	1	0	2	0	0+3	0
17	MF	(Russia) RUS	Aleksandr Golovin	45	8	29+5	8	0+1	0	2	0	8	0
18	MF	(Japan) JPN	Takumi Minamino	25	1	10+8	1	1	0	2	0	2+2	0
19	MF	(France) FRA	Youssouf Fofana	47	2	35+1	2	0+1	0	2	0	8	0
21	MF	(France) FRA	Maghnes Akliouche	18	1	11+5	0	1	1	0	0	0+1	0
41	MF	(France) FRA	Soungoutou Magassa	3	0	0+2	0	1	0	0	0	0	0
42	MF	(France) FRA	Edan Diop	8	1	1+6	1	0	0	0	0	0+1	0
44	MF	(France) FRA	Eliesse Ben Seghir	23	4	13+6	4	0+1	0	0	0	1+2	0
77	MF	(Portugal) POR	Gelson Martins	15	0	3+8	0	1	0	0+2	0	0+1	0
Forwards
9	FW	(Netherlands) NED	Myron Boadu	16	3	3+9	3	0	0	0	0	0+4	0
10	FW	(France) FRA	Wissam Ben Yedder	43	25	28+4	19	1	1	2	1	7+1	4
27	FW	(Senegal) SEN	Krépin Diatta	42	5	22+9	4	0+1	0	0+2	0	6+2	1
31	FW	(Germany) GER	Kevin Volland	24	6	7+10	3	0	0	2	0	2+3	3
36	FW	(Switzerland) SUI	Breel Embolo	42	14	19+13	12	0	0	0+2	0	3+5	2
Players transferred out during the season
5	DF	(France) FRA	Benoît Badiashile	15	2	8+2	2	0	0	0	0	5	0
7	MF	(France) FRA	Sofiane Diop	3	1	1	1	0	0	0+2	0	0	0

Source: Competitions
