= Soungoutou Magassa =

French footballer (born 2003)

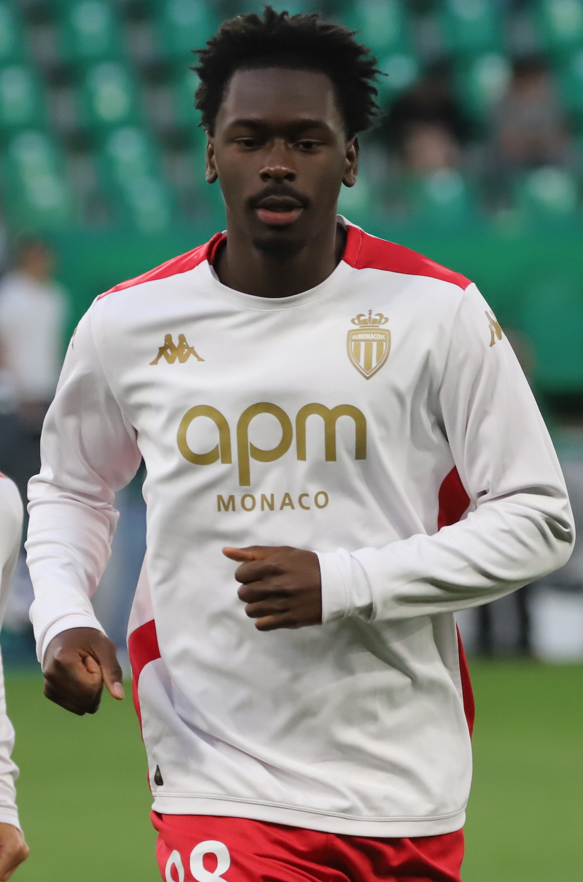
- Magassa with Monaco in 2025

Personal information
- Full name: Soungoutou Magassa
- Date of birth: 8 October 2003 (age 23)
- Place of birth: Stains, France
- Height: 1.88 m (6 ft 2 in)
- Positions: Defensive midfielder; centre-back

Team information
- Current team: West Ham United
- Number: 27

Youth career
- 2009–2012: Sucy FC
- 2012–2013: RC Joinville
- 2013–2017: Lusitanos Saint-Maur
- 2017–2018: FC Gobelins
- 2018–2022: Monaco

Senior career*
Years	Team	Apps	(Gls)
2021–2022	Monaco B	21	(1)
2022–2025	Monaco	44	(0)
2025–	West Ham United	24	(1)

International career^{‡}
2022–2023	France U20	5	(0)
2023–2025	France U21	8	(0)
2024	France Olympic	7	(0)
Medal record
Men's football
Representing (France) France
Olympic Games
Silver medal – second place	2024 Paris	Team
- * Club domestic league appearances and goals as of 17:01, 21 November 2026 (UTC) ‡ National team caps and goals as of 25 June 2025

Soungoutou Magassa (born 8 October 2003) is a French professional footballer who plays as a defensive midfielder and centre-back for EFL Championship club West Ham United.

== Early life ==
Soungoutou Magassa was born on 8 October 2003 in Stains, Seine-Saint-Denis, playing football for several Francilian clubs before joining the Monaco academy in 2018.

== Club career ==
=== Monaco ===
Magassa signed his first professional contract with Monaco in April 2021, choosing them over other high-profile clubs seeking to sign him, including Roma and Milan. He made his professional debut for Monaco on 2 January 2022, replacing Wissam Ben Yedder during a 3–1 Coupe de France away win over Quevilly-Rouen in the round of 32.

=== West Ham United ===
On 29 August 2025, Magassa signed for Premier League club West Ham United on a long-term contract for an undisclosed fee. On 4 December 2025, he scored his first Premier league goal for the club in a 1–1 draw away to Manchester United at Old Trafford.

== International career ==
Of Malian descent, Soungoutou Magassa is eligible for both the French and Malian national teams. He was called up to the France U20s for the 2023 FIFA U-20 World Cup.

== Style of play ==
Described as a box-to-box midfielder, Magassa is able to play both as a defensive midfielder and a centre-back. Good with both feet, he describes himself as a player good at winning the ball back and finding optimal passing options.

== Career statistics ==
As of match played 2 May 2026

Appearances and goals by club, season and competition
Club	Season	League			National cup (Note: Includes Coupe de France, FA Cup)		Europe		Other		Total	
Club	Season	Division	Apps	Goals	Apps	Goals	Apps	Goals	Apps	Goals	Apps	Goals
Monaco B	2021–22	Championnat National 2	21	1	—		—		—		21	1
Monaco	2021–22	Ligue 1	0	0	1	0	—		—		1	0
Monaco	2022–23	Ligue 1	2	0	1	0	0	0	—		3	0
Monaco	2023–24	Ligue 1	21	0	1	0	—		—		22	0
Monaco	2024–25	Ligue 1	23	0	2	0	7 (Note: Appearances in UEFA Champions League)	1	1 (Note: Appearance in Trophée des Champions)	0	33	1
Monaco	Total		44	0	5	0	7	1	1	0	57	1
West Ham United	2025–26	Premier League	22	1	4	0	—		—		26	1
Career total			87	2	9	0	7	1	1	0	104	3

== Honours ==
France Olympic

- Summer Olympics silver medal: 2024

Orders

- Knight of the National Order of Merit: 2024
