= Eliot Matazo =

Belgian footballer (born 2002)

Personal information
- Date of birth: 15 February 2002 (age 24)
- Place of birth: Woluwe-Saint-Lambert, Belgium
- Height: 1.70 m (5 ft 7 in)
- Position: Midfielder

Team information
- Current team: Hull City
- Number: 8

Youth career
- –2018: Anderlecht
- 2018–2019: Monaco

Senior career*
Years	Team	Apps	(Gls)
2019–2020	Monaco II	14	(0)
2020–2025	Monaco	60	(2)
2024	→ Royal Antwerp (loan)	10	(1)
2025–	Hull City	7	(1)

International career
2017–2018	Belgium U16	12	(0)
2019	Belgium U18	2	(0)
2021–2024	Belgium U21	22	(0)
- * Club domestic league appearances and goals as of 20:40, 25 April 2026 (UTC)

Eliot Matazo (born 15 February 2002) is a Belgian professional footballer who plays as a midfielder for Premier League club Hull City.

== Club career ==
=== Monaco ===
Matazo was born in the Woluwe-Saint-Lambert municipality in Brussels and grew up in its Andromède neighborhood. He came through the youth academy of RSC Anderlecht, but joined AS Monaco from Anderlecht in June 2018, aged 16. He suffered a hip injury soon after joining Monaco, which left him injured for eight months. Matazo made his professional debut for AS Monaco on 27 September 2020 in a Ligue 1 game against RC Strasbourg. On 9 May 2021, he scored his first Ligue 1 goal in a 1–0 away win over Reims.

In January 2022, Matazo signed a new four-year contract with Monaco, valid until 2026.

==== Royal Antwerp (loan) ====
On 1 February 2024, Matazo was loaned by Royal Antwerp until the end of the season.

=== Hull City ===
On 24 January 2025, Matazo joined EFL Championship club Hull City for an undisclosed fee, signing a three-and-a-half year deal with the option for a further year. He made his debut the same day coming on as a 55th-minute substitute for Matt Crooks in the 3–0 away win against Sheffield United. He scored his first goal for the club on 1 February 2025 in the 1–2 home loss to Stoke City.

In February 2025, Matazo suffered an ACL injury, which ruled him out for the remainder of the season. He returned from injury on 25 April 2026, starting away at Charlton Athletic. In the first 10 minutes of the match, he suffered another ACL injury, this time on his left knee.

== International career ==
Matazo was born in Belgium to a Congolese Malagasy father and Kenyan mother. He is a youth international for Belgium, having played up to the Belgium U21s.

== Career statistics ==
As of 25 April 2026.

Appearances and goals by club, season and competition
Club	Season	League			National cup (Note: Includes Coupe de France)		League cup		Continental		Other		Total	
Club	Season	Division	Apps	Goals	Apps	Goals	Apps	Goals	Apps	Goals	Apps	Goals	Apps	Goals
Monaco	2020–21	Ligue 1	10	1	4	0	—		—		—		14	1
Monaco	2021–22	Ligue 1	18	0	4	0	—		6	0	—		28	0
Monaco	2022–23	Ligue 1	23	1	1	0	—		5	0	—		29	1
Monaco	2023–24	Ligue 1	6	0	0	0	—		—		—		6	0
Monaco	2024–25	Ligue 1	3	0	1	0	—		3	0	—		7	0
Monaco	Total		60	2	10	0	—		14	0	—		84	2
Royal Antwerp (loan)	2023–24	Belgian Pro League	10	1	0	0	—		—		—		10	1
Hull City	2024–25	EFL Championship	6	1	—		—		—		—		6	1
Hull City	2025–26	EFL Championship	1	0	—		—		—		—		1	0
Hull City	Total		7	1	—		—		—		—		7	1
Career total			77	4	10	0	—		14	0	0	0	101	4
