= Sofiane Diop =

Footballer (born 2000)

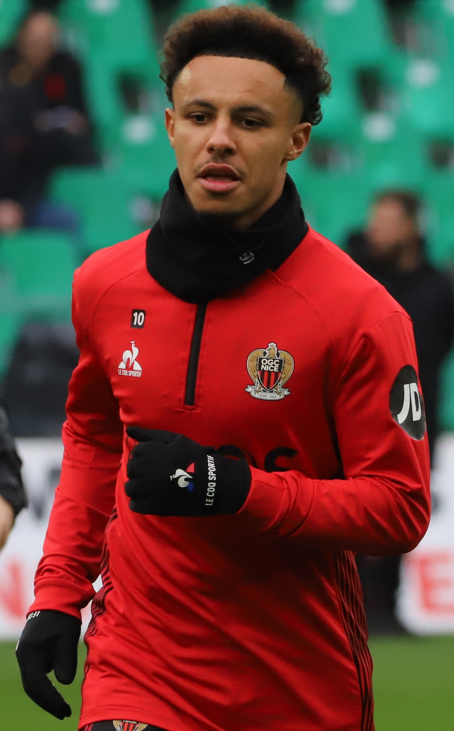
- Diop with Nice in 2025

Personal information
- Full name: Sofiane Daouda Diop
- Date of birth: 9 June 2000 (age 26)
- Place of birth: Tours, France
- Height: 1.75 m (5 ft 9 in)
- Position: Winger

Team information
- Current team: Nice
- Number: 10

Youth career
- 2006–2014: Tours
- 2014–2015: US Chambray
- 2015–2018: Rennes

Senior career*
Years	Team	Apps	(Gls)
2018	Rennes B	10	(2)
2018–2019	Monaco B	14	(2)
2018–2022	Monaco	76	(14)
2019–2020	→ Sochaux (loan)	15	(1)
2022–	Nice	100	(15)

International career^{‡}
2018	France U18	3	(0)
2018	France U19	7	(3)
2019	France U20	2	(0)
2021–2022	France U21	13	(4)
2025–	Morocco	1	(0)
- * Club domestic league appearances and goals as of 18 October 2026 ‡ National team caps and goals as of 19 November 2025

Sofiane Daouda Diop (born 9 June 2000) is a professional footballer who plays as a winger for Ligue 1 club Nice. Born in France, he plays for the Morocco national team.

== Club career ==
=== Monaco ===
On 5 July 2018, Diop signed his first professional contract with Monaco after his debut season with the reserve side of Rennes. He made his professional debut in a 4–0 loss to Paris Saint-Germain on 4 August 2018 in the Trophée des Champions.

=== Nice ===
On 29 August 2022, fellow Ligue 1 club Nice announced the signing of Diop from Monaco.

== International career ==
Diop holds both French and Senegalese nationalities. He was a youth international for the France U18s.

In November 2023, Diop opted to play for Morocco over France and Senegal.

Two years later, Diop finally made his senior international debut in a friendly against Uganda.

== Personal life ==
Diop was born to a Senegalese father and a Moroccan mother. His younger brother, Edan Diop, is also a professional footballer.

== Career statistics ==
=== Club ===
As of match played 18 October 2026

Appearances and goals by club, season and competition
Club	Season	League			Coupe de France		Coupe de la Ligue		Europe		Other		Total	
Club	Season	Division	Apps	Goals	Apps	Goals	Apps	Goals	Apps	Goals	Apps	Goals	Apps	Goals
Rennes B	2017–18	Championnat National 1	10	2	—		—		—		—		10	2
Monaco B	2018–19	Championnat National 1	13	2	—		—		—		—		13	2
Monaco B	2019–20	Championnat National 1	1	0	—		—		—		—		1	0
Monaco B	Total		14	2	—		—		—		—		14	2
Monaco	2018–19	Ligue 1	13	0	1	0	3	0	4 (Note: Appearances in UEFA Champions League)	0	1 (Note: Appearance in Trophée des Champions)	0	22	0
Monaco	2020–21	Ligue 1	32	7	3	0	—		—		—		35	7
Monaco	2021–22	Ligue 1	30	6	4	1	—		11 (Note: Four appearances and one goal in UEFA Champions League, seven appearances and one goal in UEFA Europa League)	2	—		45	9
Monaco	2022–23	Ligue 1	1	1	0	0	—		2	0	—		3	1
Monaco	Total		76	14	8	1	3	0	17	2	1	0	105	17
Sochaux (loan)	2019–20	Ligue 2	15	1	0	0	0	0	—		—		15	1
Sochaux B (loan)	2019–20	Championnat National 3	1	0	—		—		—		—		1	0
Nice	2022–23	Ligue 1	22	1	1	0	—		5 (Note: Appearances in UEFA Europa Conference League)	1	—		28	2
Nice	2023–24	Ligue 1	10	0	0	0	—		—		—		10	0
Nice	2024–25	Ligue 1	28	6	3	0	—		7 (Note: Appearances in UEFA Europa League)	0	—		38	6
Nice	2025–26	Ligue 1	33	8	4	2	—		7 (Note: Two appearances in UEFA Champions League, five appearances in UEFA Europa League)	0	2 (Note: Appearances in Ligue 1 relegation/promotion play-offs)	0	46	10
Nice	2026–27	Ligue 1	7	0	0	0	—		—		—		7	0
Nice	Total		100	15	8	2	—		19	1	2	0	129	18
Career total			216	34	16	3	3	0	36	3	3	0	274	40

=== International ===
As of match played 18 November 2025

National team	Year	Apps	Goals
Morocco	2025	1	0
Total		1	0

== Honours ==
Monaco

- Coupe de France runner-up: 2020–21

Nice

- Coupe de France runner-up: 2025–26
