= Alexander Nübel =

German footballer (born 1996)

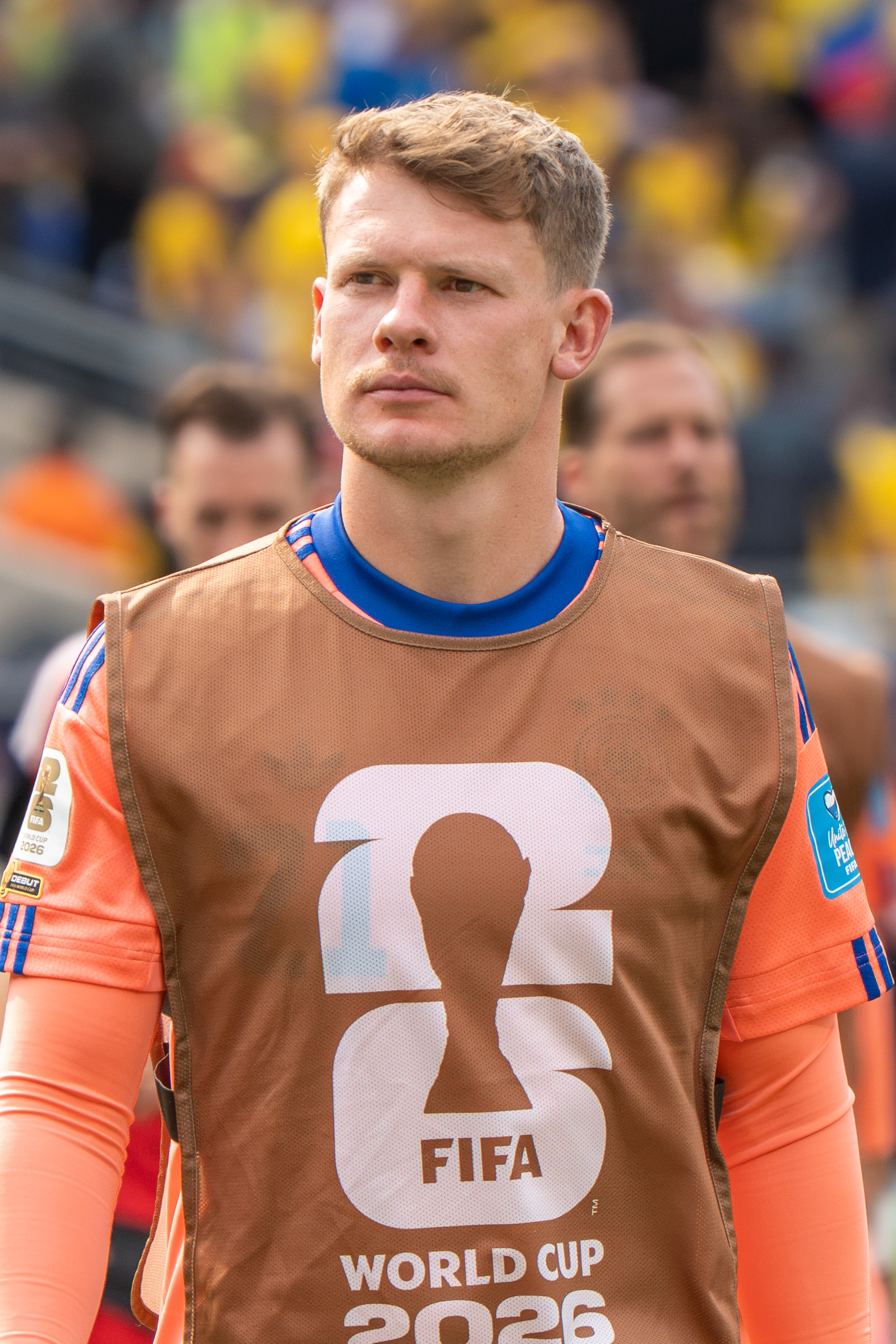
- Nübel with Germany in 2026

Personal information
- Full name: Alexander Nübel
- Date of birth: 30 September 1996 (age 30)
- Place of birth: Paderborn, Germany
- Height: 1.93 m (6 ft 4 in)
- Position: Goalkeeper

Team information
- Current team: Beşiktaş
- Number: 1

Youth career
- –2005: TSV Tudorf
- 2005–2014: SC Paderborn

Senior career*
Years	Team	Apps	(Gls)
2014–2015	SC Paderborn	0	(0)
2015–2019	Schalke 04 II	24	(0)
2016–2020	Schalke 04	46	(0)
2020–2026	Bayern Munich	1	(0)
2021–2023	→ Monaco (loan)	76	(0)
2023–2026	→ VfB Stuttgart (loan)	98	(0)
2026–	Beşiktaş	12	(0)

International career^{‡}
2017–2019	Germany U21	17	(0)
2024–	Germany	4	(0)
Medal record
Men's football
Representing Germany
UEFA European Under-21 Championship
Runner-up	2019 Italy
- * Club domestic league appearances and goals as of 22:30, 22 November 2026 (UTC) ‡ National team caps and goals as of 20:40, 27 September 2026 (UTC)

Alexander Nübel (German pronunciation: [alɛˈksandɐ ˈnyːbl̩]; born 30 September 1996) is a German professional footballer who plays as a goalkeeper for Süper Lig club Beşiktaş and the Germany national team.

== Club career ==
=== Early years ===
Nübel grew up in Salzkotten-Tudorf in East Westphalia, and began playing football at TSV Tudorf. In 2005 he moved to the youth department of SC Paderborn, where he was initially active as an outfield player until under-14 level. Initially with Paderborn, he moved up to the professional squad for the 2014–15 season, but remained inactive throughout the season.

=== Schalke 04 ===
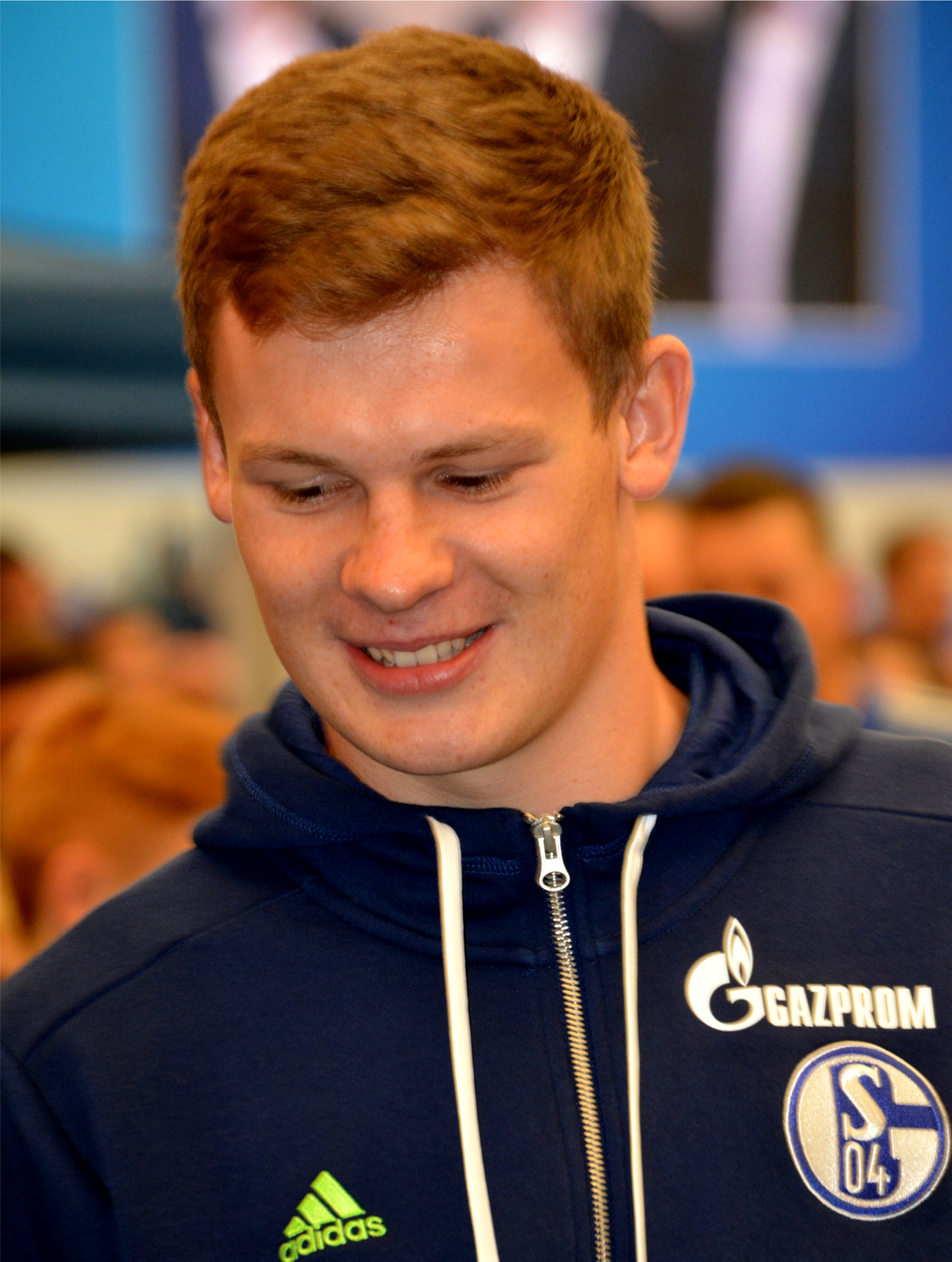
Nübel with Schalke 04 in 2016

Nübel moved to Schalke 04 as its back-up goalkeeper to Ralf Fährmann. On 24 October 2018, he made his Champions League debut for Schalke in a goalless draw against Galatasaray.

After the winter break, Schalke's head coach Domenico Tedesco, dropped Fährmann as the club's first-choice goalkeeper and promoted Nübel. On 2 February 2019, Nübel was sent off with a straight red card in a match against Borussia Mönchengladbach and was suspended for the club's next two Bundesliga matches. Nübel started in every match for Schalke after he was selected as the first-choice goalkeeper, except two matches he was suspended for.

On 6 August 2019, Nübel was selected by Schalke's head coach David Wagner as the club's new captain. He entered the season with only one year left on his contract with Schalke. On 22 December 2019, Schalke revealed that Nübel had informed the club that he would not renew his contract. On 4 January 2020, Nübel agreed to join Bayern Munich on a free transfer at the end of the season. He then handed the captaincy over to Omar Mascarell.

=== Bayern Munich ===
Nübel joined Bayern Munich on 30 June 2020. He made his debut for Bayern in the first round of the DFB-Pokal on 15 October where the club defeated fifth division club 1. FC Düren 3–0. On 1 December 2020, he made his Champions League debut with Bayern in a 1–1 away draw against Atlético Madrid during the group stage of the 2020–21 season. On 15 May 2021, he made his Bundesliga debut in a 2–2 away draw against Freiburg.

==== 2021–23: Loan to Monaco ====
On 27 June 2021, Nübel was loaned out to French Ligue 1 club Monaco on a two-season loan, with Bayern Munich having the option to cut the loan short after one season.

==== Since 2023: Loan to VfB Stuttgart with extension for two more years ====
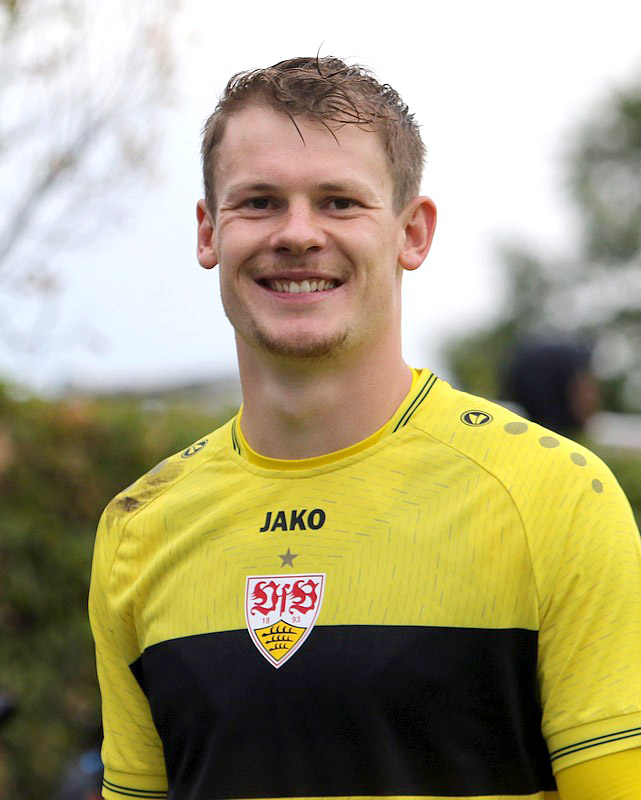
Nübel with VfB Stuttgart in 2023

On 25 July 2023, Nübel returned to the Bundesliga and joined VfB Stuttgart on a season-long loan. On 12 April 2024, he signed a contract extension with Bayern Munich until 2029, and his loan was extended for two more years at Stuttgart.

=== Beşiktaş ===
On 8 July 2026, Nübel signed a three-year contract with Süper Lig club Beşiktaş for an undisclosed transfer fee.

== International career ==
Nübel was a youth international footballer for Germany. On 16 May 2024, he was named in the 27-man preliminary squad of Germany for the UEFA Euro 2024. However, on 7 June, he was excluded from the final squad prior to the tournament. Later that year, on 11 October, he made his senior debut by starting in a 2–1 away victory against Bosnia and Herzegovina in the UEFA Nations League. On 21 May 2026, he was selected in Germany’s 26-man squad for the 2026 FIFA World Cup.

== Career statistics ==
=== Club ===
As of match played 8 November 2026

Appearances and goals by club, season and competition
Club	Season	League			National cup (Note: Includes DFB-Pokal, Coupe de France)		Europe		Other		Total	
Club	Season	Division	Apps	Goals	Apps	Goals	Apps	Goals	Apps	Goals	Apps	Goals
SC Paderborn	2014–15	Bundesliga	0	0	0	0	—		—		0	0
Schalke 04 II	2015–16	Regionalliga West	13	0	—		—		—		13	0
Schalke 04 II	2016–17	Regionalliga West	10	0	—		—		—		10	0
Schalke 04 II	2017–18	Oberliga Westfalen	1	0	—		—		—		1	0
Schalke 04 II	Total		24	0	—		—		—		24	0
Schalke 04	2015–16	Bundesliga	1	0	0	0	0	0	—		1	0
Schalke 04	2016–17	Bundesliga	0	0	0	0	0	0	—		0	0
Schalke 04	2017–18	Bundesliga	1	0	0	0	—		—		1	0
Schalke 04	2018–19	Bundesliga	18	0	2	0	2 (Note: Appearances in UEFA Champions League)	0	—		22	0
Schalke 04	2019–20	Bundesliga	26	0	3	0	—		—		29	0
Schalke 04	Total		46	0	5	0	2	0	—		53	0
Bayern Munich	2020–21	Bundesliga	1	0	1	0	2	0	0	0	4	0
Monaco (loan)	2021–22	Ligue 1	38	0	1	0	10 (Note: Three appearances in UEFA Champions League, seven appearances in UEFA Europa League)	0	—		49	0
Monaco (loan)	2022–23	Ligue 1	38	0	0	0	10 (Note: Two appearances in UEFA Champions League, eight appearances in UEFA Europa League)	0	—		48	0
Monaco (loan)	Total		76	0	1	0	20	0	—		97	0
VfB Stuttgart (loan)	2023–24	Bundesliga	30	0	4	0	—		—		34	0
VfB Stuttgart (loan)	2024–25	Bundesliga	34	0	4	0	7	0	1 (Note: Appearance in Franz Beckenbauer Supercup)	0	46	0
VfB Stuttgart (loan)	2025–26	Bundesliga	34	0	4	0	11 (Note: Appearances in UEFA Europa League)	0	0	0	49	0
VfB Stuttgart (loan)	Total		98	0	12	0	18	0	1	0	129	0
Beşiktaş	2026–27	Süper Lig	11	0	0	0	10	0	—		21	0
Career total			256	0	19	0	52	0	1	0	328	0

=== International ===
As of match played 27 September 2026

Appearances and goals by national team and year
National team	Year	Apps	Goals
Germany	2024	2	0
Germany	2026	2	0
Total		4	0

== Honours ==
Bayern Munich

- Bundesliga: 2020–21
- DFL-Supercup: 2020
- UEFA Super Cup: 2020
- FIFA Club World Cup: 2020

VfB Stuttgart

- DFB-Pokal: 2024–25

Individual

- UEFA European Under-21 Championship Team of the Tournament: 2019
