= Félix Lemaréchal =

French footballer (born 2003)

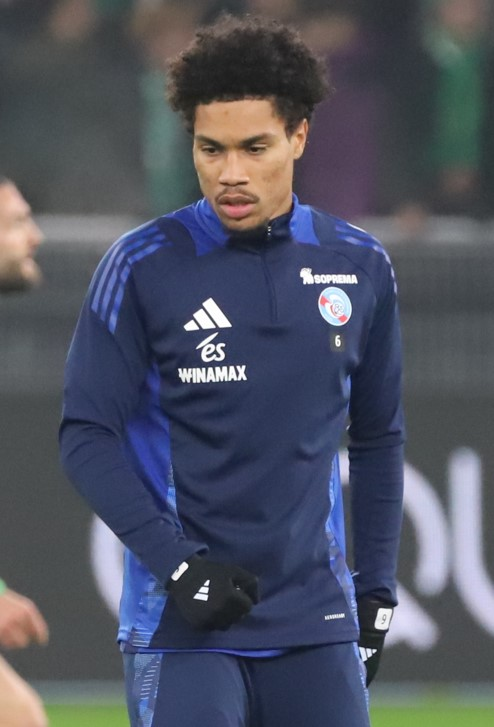
- Lemaréchal with Strasbourg in 2024

Personal information
- Date of birth: 7 August 2003 (age 23)
- Place of birth: Tours, France
- Height: 1.81 m (5 ft 11 in)
- Position: Midfielder

Team information
- Current team: Club Brugge
- Number: 80

Youth career
- 2010–2011: Tours
- 2011–2015: EB Saint-Cyr-sur-Loire
- 2015–2017: Tours
- 2017–2018: EB Saint-Cyr-sur-Loire
- 2018–2019: Bordeaux
- 2019–2021: Monaco

Senior career*
Years	Team	Apps	(Gls)
2021–2024	Monaco	1	(0)
2021–2022	→ Monaco B	20	(2)
2023	→ Brest (loan)	13	(0)
2023–2024	→ Cercle Brugge (loan)	31	(2)
2024–2026	Strasbourg	38	(4)
2024	Strasbourg B	2	(0)
2026–	Club Brugge	12	(1)

International career^{‡}
2019	France U16	6	(0)
2019	France U17	2	(0)
2025	France U21	5	(0)
- * Club domestic league appearances and goals as of 31 October 2026 ‡ National team caps and goals as of 25 June 2025

Félix Lemaréchal (born 7 August 2003) is a French professional footballer who plays as a midfielder for Belgian Pro League club Club Brugge.

== Club career ==
Félix Lemaréchal made his professional debut for Monaco on 16 October 2021, coming on as a substitute in the 2–0 away Ligue 1 loss against Lyon.

On 31 January 2023, Lemaréchal joined Brest on loan until the end of the season with the option to make the move permanent.

On 13 August 2024, Lemaréchal joined Strasbourg.

On 24 January 2026, Lemaréchal returned to Bruges in Belgium and signed a three-and-a-half year contract with Club Brugge.

== International career ==
Born in France, Lemaréchal is of Ivorian descent. He is a youth international for France.

== Career statistics ==
As of match played 31 October 2026

Appearances and goals by club, season and competition
Club	Season	League			National cup		Europe		Other		Total	
Club	Season	Division	Apps	Goals	Apps	Goals	Apps	Goals	Apps	Goals	Apps	Goals
Monaco B	2021–22	CFA 2	20	2	—		—		—		20	2
Monaco	2021–22	Ligue 1	1	0	1	0	0	0	—		2	0
Monaco	2022–23	Ligue 1	0	0	0	0	0	0	—		0	0
Monaco	Total		1	0	1	0	0	0	0	0	2	0
Brest (loan)	2022–23	Ligue 1	13	0	—		—		—		13	0
Cercle Brugge (loan)	2023–24	Belgian Pro League	31	2	1	0	—		—		32	2
Strasbourg	2024–25	Ligue 1	27	4	3	1	—		—		30	5
Strasbourg	2025–26	Ligue 1	11	0	0	0	4 (Note: Appearances in UEFA Conference League)	0	—		15	0
Strasbourg	Total		38	4	3	1	4	0	—		45	5
Club Brugge	2025–26	Belgian Pro League	2	0	0	0	2 (Note: Appearances in UEFA Champions League)	0	—		4	0
Club Brugge	2026–27	Belgian Pro League	10	1	1	1	3	0	1 (Note: Appearance in Belgian Super Cup)	0	15	2
Club Brugge	Total		12	1	1	1	5	0	1	0	19	2
Career total			115	9	6	2	9	0	1	0	131	11
