= Wissam Ben Yedder =

French footballer (born 1990)

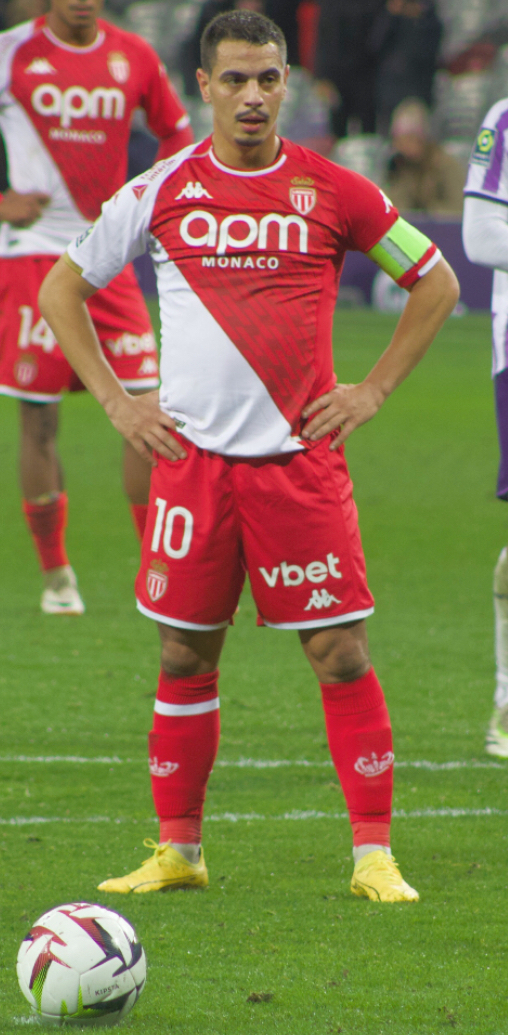
- Ben Yedder with Monaco in 2023

Personal information
- Full name: Wissam Ben Yedder
- Date of birth: 12 August 1990 (age 36)
- Place of birth: Sarcelles, Val-d'Oise, France
- Height: 1.70 m (5 ft 7 in)
- Position: Striker

Team information
- Current team: Wydad AC
- Number: 35

Youth career
- 2000–2007: FCM Garges
- 2007–2009: US Saint-Denis

Senior career*
Years	Team	Apps	(Gls)
2009–2010	UJA Alfortville	23	(17)
2010–2013	Toulouse II	20	(14)
2010–2016	Toulouse	156	(63)
2016–2019	Sevilla	91	(38)
2019–2024	Monaco	164	(98)
2025	Sepahan	5	(1)
2025–2026	Sakaryaspor	14	(5)
2026	Wydad AC	16	(3)
2026–	Paris 13 Atletico	0	(0)

International career
2010	France (futsal)	2	(1)
2012	France U21	3	(1)
2018–2022	France	19	(3)
Medal record
Men's football
Representing France
UEFA Nations League
Winner	2021 Italy
- * Club domestic league appearances and goals as of 5 July 2026 (UTC)

Wissam Ben Yedder (born 12 August 1990) is a French professional footballer who plays as a striker for Ligue 3 club Paris 13 Atletico.

Having begun his career at amateurs UJA Alfortville, Ben Yedder joined Toulouse in 2010. He totalled 71 goals in 174 games for them, surpassing André-Pierre Gignac as their greatest league scorer of the 21st century. He moved to Sevilla for €10 million in 2016, and scored 70 goals in 138 games in three seasons. A €40 million transfer to Monaco followed in 2019, and he finished as joint-Ligue 1 top scorer in his first season back. He totalled 201 games and 118 goals before his release in 2024. In 2025, Ben Yedder joined Sepahan on a free transfer, staying for the remainder of the season before joining Sakaryaspor in September. In 2026 he joined Moroccan club Wydad AC for six months. In November 2026, he joined French third tier club Paris 13 Atletico.

At international level, Ben Yedder represented France at under-21 level, and at futsal. He made his full senior debut for France in March 2018. He appeared in only one major tournament for France, the UEFA Euro 2020 in 2021, where he was a backup player.

== Early life ==
Wissam Ben Yedder was born on 12 August 1990 in Sarcelles, Val-d'Oise. He is Tunisian by descent and holds a Tunisian passport. He received a French passport in 2009. He is the fourth of six children and grew up in Garges-lès-Gonesse, Val-d'Oise. Among his childhood friends was Riyad Mahrez.

== Club career ==
=== Toulouse ===
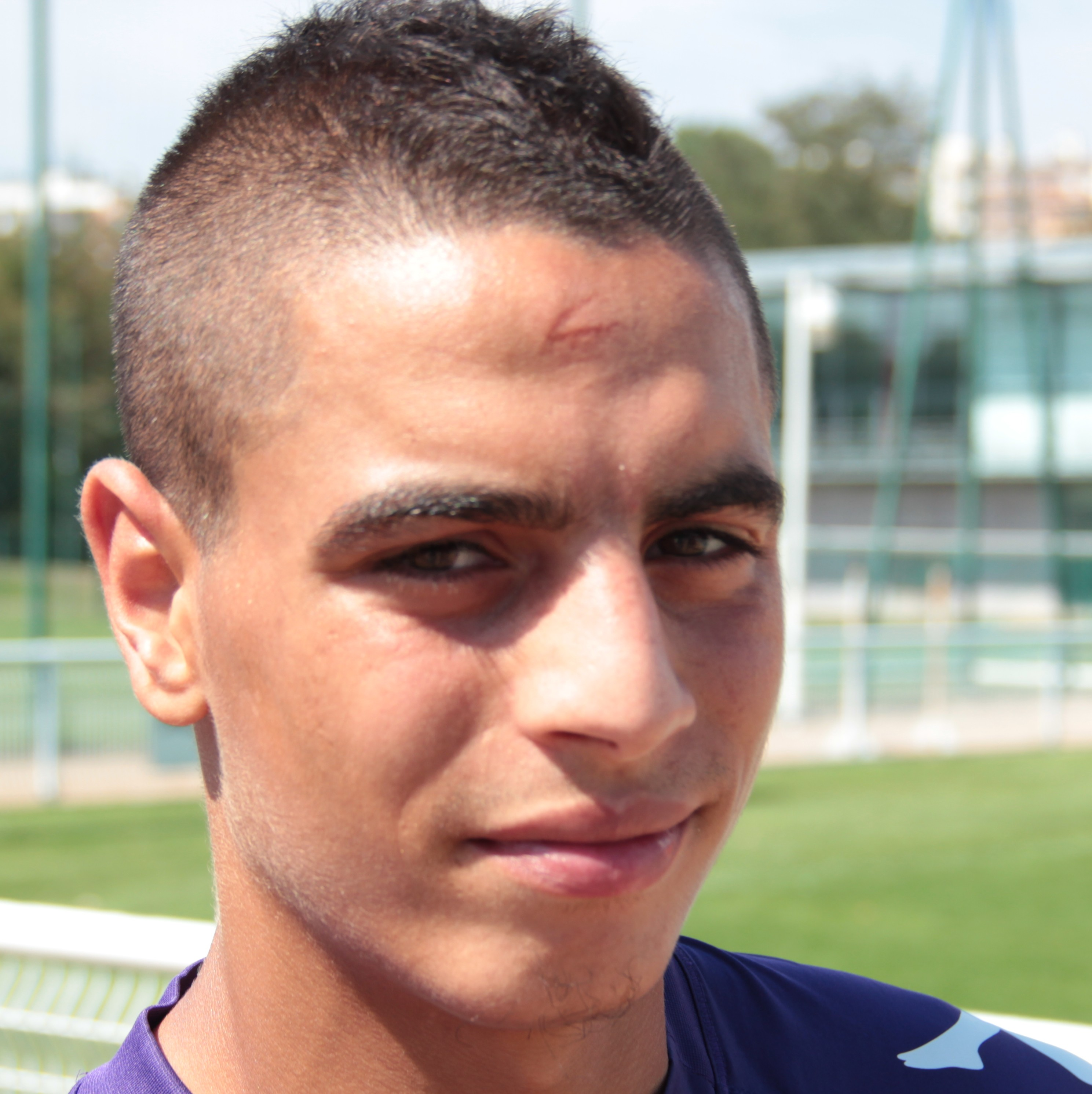
Ben Yedder with Toulouse in 2012

Ben Yedder began his career at local UJA Alfortville in the fourth-tier Championnat de France Amateur, before moving to Toulouse of Ligue 1 in 2010. On 16 October 2010, he made his professional debut in a 0–2 home loss to Paris Saint-Germain, replacing Yannis Tafer for the final 29 minutes. He made 13 substitute appearances across his first two seasons, and scored his first goal for Toulouse on 21 April 2012: ten minutes after coming on in place of Paulo Machado, he equalised in an eventual 2–1 loss at Evian.

In the following three Ligue 1 campaigns, Ben Yedder recorded 15, 16 and 14 goals respectively. On 10 August 2012, in the first game of the season, he came on at half time for Pantxi Sirieix and equalised for a 1–1 draw at reigning champions and local rivals Montpellier. In the reverse fixture, the last of the campaign, on 26 May 2013, he scored both goals in a win over Montpellier.

On 30 November 2013, Ben Yedder scored a hat-trick in a 5–1 home win over Sochaux. He recorded another treble on 17 May 2014 as Toulouse finished the season with a 3–1 win over Valenciennes.

Ben Yedder scored a penalty in a 3–3 draw against Caen on 20 September 2014. In doing so, he reached 35 Ligue 1 goals for Toulouse, surpassing André-Pierre Gignac as their highest scorer in the league in the 21st century. He attained the milestone of 50 goals in the competition on 19 December 2015, when he put them ahead in a 1–1 home draw against Lille. The following 9 January, he scored another hat-trick in a 3–1 win at fellow strugglers Reims.

=== Sevilla ===
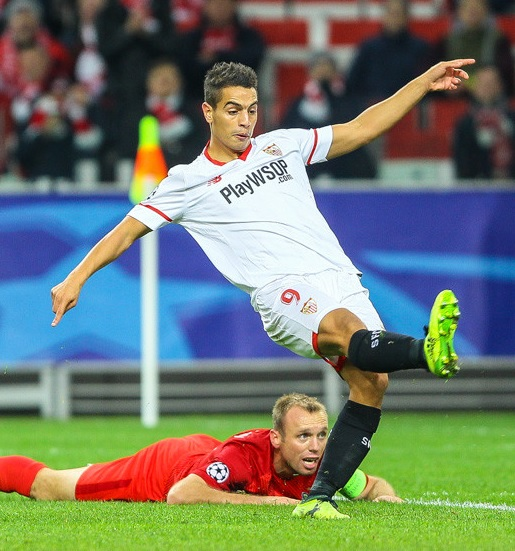
Ben Yedder playing for Sevilla in 2017

On 30 July 2016, Ben Yedder signed a five-year contract with Spanish club Sevilla, for a reported €9 million fee. After being an unused substitute in their UEFA Super Cup loss to Real Madrid on 9 August, he made his debut five days later, replacing fellow new signing Luciano Vietto for the final 29 minutes of a 0–2 loss to Barcelona in the first leg of the year's domestic equivalent. On 20 August, he started in his first La Liga game and scored a goal in a 6–4 victory over Espanyol at the Ramón Sánchez Pizjuán Stadium.

Ben Yedder scored five goals across Sevilla's 14–2 aggregate Copa del Rey win over Tercera División club Formentera in December 2016, including a hat-trick in the 9–1 home victory in the second leg. This haul made him the tournament's top scorer that season, alongside Barcelona's Lionel Messi. On 7 January 2017, he registered a hat-trick in a 4–0 La Liga win at Real Sociedad.

In Sevilla's UEFA Champions League campaign in 2017–18, Ben Yedder scored all three goals in a group stage victory over Slovenia's Maribor on 26 September, his first hat-trick in the competition. On 21 November, after scoring twice as Sevilla came from a 0–3 deficit at half time to draw with Liverpool, he taunted A.C. Milan – who lost the 2005 Champions League Final to Liverpool in a similar fashion – over Twitter. On 13 March 2018, in the second leg of the 2017–18 Champions League round of 16 against Manchester United at Old Trafford, Ben Yedder came on as a substitute in the 72nd minute and scored two goals in the span of 4 minutes to help secure a 2–1 win and enable Sevilla to reach the quarter-finals of the Champions League for the first time since 1958, and for the first time ever in the Champions League era.

In September 2018, Ben Yedder scored five goals in the space of three days, with two in a 5–1 UEFA Europa League home win against Standard Liège and a hat-trick in a 6–2 La Liga away victory against Levante.

=== Monaco ===
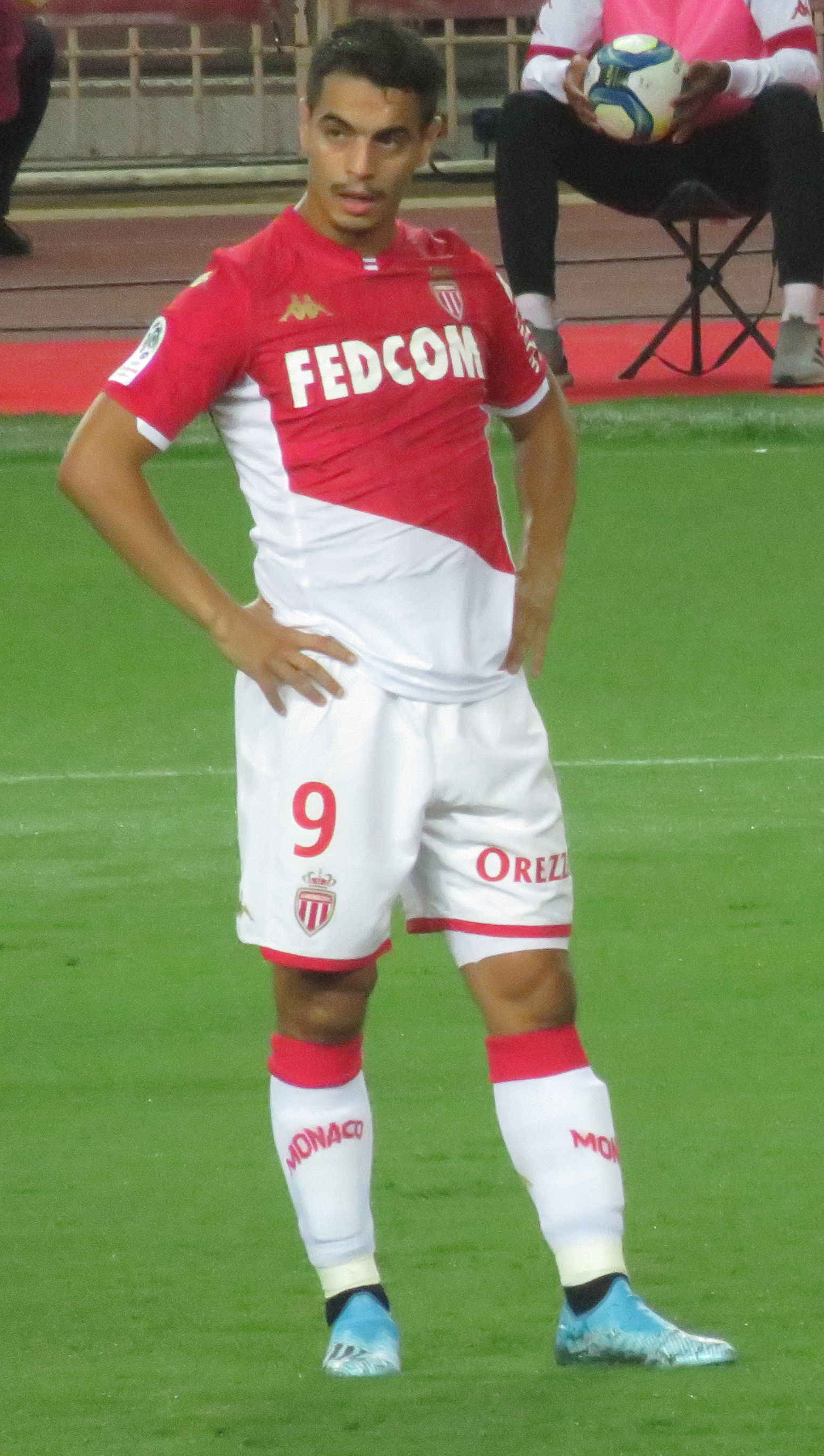
Ben Yedder playing for Monaco in 2019

On 14 August 2019, Ben Yedder signed with Monaco on a five-year contract after they activated his release clause of €40 million, a record sale for Sevilla. Rony Lopes transferred in the other direction. He made his debut three days later, starting alongside fellow debutant Henry Onyekuru and pushing Radamel Falcao to the substitutes' bench in a 3–0 loss away to Metz. On 25 August, he scored his first goal for the club in his first game at the Stade Louis II in a 2–2 draw with Nîmes.

In December 2019, Ben Yedder won the UNFP Player of the Month award with four goals and two assists in four games, including two in a 5–1 home win over Lille on 21 December. His first season in the principality was curtailed in early March 2020 due to the coronavirus pandemic, but he finished as joint top scorer alongside PSG's Kylian Mbappé with 18 goals from 26 games, a new record for him in Ligue 1.

In 2020–21, Ben Yedder helped Monaco finish as runners-up in the Coupe de France, scoring in wins over Lyon and Rumilly-Vallières in the quarter-final and semi-final. On 2 May 2021, he scored his 100th goal in Ligue 1 in a 2–3 home defeat against the former. He finished the season as second-highest scorer behind Mbappé's 27 goals, joint with Lyon's Memphis Depay on 20.

Ben Yedder scored 25 league goals in 2021–22, runner-up to Mbappé's 28. This included a hat-trick in the penultimate game, a 4–2 comeback home win over Brest and a brace in a 3-0 home win over PSG on 20 March 2022. He scored five goals in four games on a run to the Coupe de France semi-finals, before missing with the first attempt in a penalty shootout defeat to Nantes. He was Player of the Month with 56% of the votes in January 2022 for his three goals and one assist; he, Mbappé and Rennes' Martin Terrier were the three forwards chosen for the Team of the Year.

In 2022–23, Ben Yedder did not score until his sixth match, concluding a 3–0 win at Reims on 18 September 2022; he followed this with a hat-trick in a 4–1 home win over Nantes on 2 October. The following 15 January, he added another treble in the first half of a 7–1 victory over visitors Ajaccio; the result made Monaco the only team apart from PSG to have two players with 10 goals or more for the season, namely himself and Breel Embolo. On 11 February, he scored twice in a 3–1 home win over leaders PSG, ending the season with 19 goals, joint seventh best in the league.

On the first day of the 2023–24 Ligue 1 season, with Adi Hütter as new manager after Monaco had failed to qualify for Europe, Ben Yedder scored twice in a 4–2 win at Clermont. His second goal of the game was his 100th for the club, putting him third behind Delio Onnis and Lucien Cossou in Monaco's all-time rankings. Hütter continued to play Ben Yedder in spite of the player being charged by the French judiciary days before the start of the season. Ben Yedder scored in his final game for the club in a 4–0 win against Nantes on 19 May 2024.

On 25 May 2024, it was announced that Ben Yedder would be released by Monaco at the end of his contract on 30 June, having spent five seasons with the side. He left Monaco with 118 goals in 201 appearances, making him Monaco's second all-time top goalscorer after Onnis.

=== Later career ===
In April 2025, Ben Yedder joined Iranian club Sepahan. He later signed with Turkish side Sakaryaspor in September 2025. During his short lived spell in Turkey, Ben Yedder netted a hat-trick against Adana Demirspor in a 6-0 win. In January 2026, he joined Botola Pro club Wydad AC on a six-month contract, with an option to extend for an additional year, but left the club at the end of his contract in July 2026. On 17 November 2026, he signed a six months contract with French Ligue 3 side Paris 13 Atletico, returning to his homeland Paris, where he was born and raised.

== International career ==
Ben Yedder played two futsal matches for France, scoring once, and also represented the nation three times at under-21 level.

As Ben Yedder's parents' come from Tunisia and therefore he would qualify to represent that nation in international football under FIFA regulations, the Tunisian Football Federation made five attempts to get him to play for their team. In October 2017, after he turned down their offer to get him into the squad before the 2018 FIFA World Cup, they admitted defeat.

In March 2018, after playing well for Sevilla, France manager Didier Deschamps included Ben Yedder in the squad for two friendly matches against Colombia and Russia. He made his debut in the 3–2 loss to the Colombians on 23 March at the Stade de France, replacing Olivier Giroud for the final 17 minutes. On 17 May, he was named on the standby list for the 23-man French squad for the World Cup.

On 11 June 2019, Ben Yedder made his first start for the France senior team and scored his first senior international goal, in the 4–0 away win over Andorra in a UEFA Euro 2020 qualifying match. In May 2021, he was selected for the delayed finals. He was left out by France for their September 2022 fixtures due to a slow start to the club season; though his form improved, he was not recalled for the 2022 FIFA World Cup.

== Legal issues and criminal charges ==
In April 2023, Ben Yedder was given a six-month suspended prison sentence and fined €133,799 for tax offences while a Sevilla player. After a 2019 request, he paid his taxes for 2017 but did not include interest received or his sponsorship deal from Adidas.

On 11 August 2023, prosecutors in Nice charged Ben Yedder and his brother with rape, attempted rape, and sexual assault in relation to an alleged incident involving two women that happened in July in Beausoleil, Alpes-Maritimes.

On 9 September 2024, Ben Yedder was charged with sexual assault by prosecutors in Nice relating to an incident on 6 September. On 12 November, he was given a two year suspended sentence after being found guilty of drink-driving, sexual assault, and refusal to co-operate with authorities. He was ordered to pay €6,500 in damages and a €5,000 fine, and his driving license was suspended for six months.

== Career statistics ==
=== Club ===
As of match played 5 July 2026

Appearances and goals by club, season and competition
Club	Season	League			National cup (Note: Includes Coupe de France, Copa del Rey, Hazfi Cup)		League cup (Note: Includes Coupe de la Ligue)		Continental		Other		Total	
Club	Season	Division	Apps	Goals	Apps	Goals	Apps	Goals	Apps	Goals	Apps	Goals	Apps	Goals
UJA Alfortville	2009–10	CFA	23	9	0	0	—		—		—		23	9
Toulouse II	2010–11	CFA 2	17	11	—		—		—		—		17	11
Toulouse II	2011–12	CFA 2	1	1	—		—		—		—		1	1
Toulouse II	2012–13	CFA 2	2	2	—		—		—		—		2	2
Toulouse II	Total		20	14	—		—		—		—		20	14
Toulouse	2010–11	Ligue 1	4	0	1	0	0	0	—		—		5	0
Toulouse	2011–12	Ligue 1	9	1	1	0	1	0	—		—		11	1
Toulouse	2012–13	Ligue 1	34	15	2	0	1	0	—		—		37	15
Toulouse	2013–14	Ligue 1	38	16	2	0	2	1	—		—		42	17
Toulouse	2014–15	Ligue 1	36	14	1	1	1	0	—		—		38	15
Toulouse	2015–16	Ligue 1	35	17	2	1	4	5	—		—		41	23
Toulouse	Total		156	63	9	2	9	6	—		—		174	71
Sevilla	2016–17	La Liga	31	11	4	5	—		5 (Note: Appearances in UEFA Europa League)	2	2 (Note: Appearance(s) in Supercopa de España)	0	42	18
Sevilla	2017–18	La Liga	25	9	6	3	—		11 (Note: Appearances in UEFA Champions League)	10	—		42	22
Sevilla	2018–19	La Liga	35	18	5	2	—		13	10	1	0	54	30
Sevilla	Total		91	38	15	10	—		29	22	3	0	138	70
Monaco	2019–20	Ligue 1	26	18	3	1	2	0	—		—		31	19
Monaco	2020–21	Ligue 1	37	20	4	2	—		—		—		41	22
Monaco	2021–22	Ligue 1	37	25	4	5	—		11 (Note: Four appearances and two goals in UEFA Champions League, seven appearances in UEFA Europa League)	2	—		52	32
Monaco	2022–23	Ligue 1	32	19	1	1	—		10 (Note: Two appearances and one goal in UEFA Champions League, eight appearances and four goals in UEFA Europa League)	5	—		43	25
Monaco	2023–24	Ligue 1	32	16	2	4	—		—		—		34	20
Monaco	Total		164	98	14	13	2	0	21	7	—		201	118
Sepahan	2024–25	Persian Gulf Pro League	5	1	1	0	—		—		—		6	1
Sakaryaspor	2025–26	TFF 1. Lig	14	5	—		—		—		—		14	5
Wydad AC	2025–26	Botola Pro	16	3	1	0	—		6 (Note: Appearances in CAF Confederation Cup)	1	—		23	4
Paris 13 Atletico	2026–27	Ligue 3	0	0	—		—		—		—		0	0
Career total			489	231	40	25	11	6	56	30	3	0	598	292

=== International ===
Appearances and goals by national team and year
National team	Year	Apps	Goals
France	2018	1	0
France	2019	7	2
France	2020	3	0
France	2021	5	0
France	2022	3	1
Total		19	3

France score listed first, score column indicates score after each Ben Yedder goal

List of international goals scored by Wissam Ben Yedder
No.	Date	Venue	Cap	Opponent	Score	Result	Competition	Ref.
1	11 June 2019	Estadi Nacional, Andorra la Vella, Andorra	4	Andorra	2–0	4–0	UEFA Euro 2020 qualifying	
2	10 September 2019	Stade de France, Saint-Denis, France	5	Andorra	3–0	3–0	UEFA Euro 2020 qualifying	
3	29 March 2022	Stade Pierre-Mauroy, Villeneuve-d'Ascq, France	18	South Africa	4–0	5–0	Friendly	

== Honours ==
Sevilla

- Copa del Rey runner-up: 2017–18

Monaco

- Coupe de France runner-up: 2020–21

France

- UEFA Nations League: 2020–21

Individual

- UNFP Ligue 1 Team of the Year: 2021–22
- UNFP Ligue 1 Player of the Month: December 2019, January 2022, January 2023
- Ligue 1 top scorer: 2019–20 (joint)
