= Stéphane Nado =

French footballer (born 1972)

Personal information
- Date of birth: 28 August 1972 (age 54)
- Place of birth: Loudéac, France

Senior career*
Years	Team	Apps	(Gls)
1990–1995	Stade Briochin		
1995–1996	Vannes		
1996–2000	Pontivy		
2000–2002	Vannes		

Managerial career
- 2010–2014: Brest B
- 2014–2016: Marseille U19
- 2018–2019: Caen B
- 2021–: Monaco B
- 2022: Monaco (caretaker)
- 2022–2024: U20 & U23 Morocco Women (Head Coach)
- 2025: Renaissance Club Athletic Zemamra (Head Coach)
- 2025–2026: Djibouti (Head Coach)
- * Club domestic league appearances and goals

Stéphane Nado (born in Loudéac the 28 August 1972) is a French professional football coach and former defender who played in Ligue 2 with Stade Briochin.

== Career ==
At the age of 29, he beganhis coaching career with the U17 at En Avant Guingamp. In 2010, he joined Stade Brestois as academy director and assistant coach of the first team. Four years later, in 2014, he takes charge of the U19 team at Olympique de Marseille. In 2018, he is appointed academy director at Stade Malherbe Caen.

In 2021, Nado became manager of Monaco B competing in Championnat National 2. In January 2022, he briefly serves as interim manager of Monaco's first team for a French cup match against Quevilly Rouen Metropole, which Monaco won 3-1.

From 2017 to 2018, he is assistant to Corentin Martins with the Mauritania national team. In November 2022, he joins the Moroccan Football Federation as head coach of the U20 and U23 women’s national teams. Under his leadership, Morocco participates in the FIFA U17 Women’s World Cup in India and qualifies for the U20 Women’s World Cup in Colombia.

On 11 March 2025, he signs a contract as manager of Renaissance Club Athletic Zemamra, in Morocco Botola first division.

On 11 June 2025, Stéphane NADO is appointed head coach of Djibouti national football team.
