= Derby de la Côte d'Azur =

Football rivalry in France

- Other names: Côte d'Azur Derby
- Location: Nice, France; Fontvieille, Monaco
- Teams: Monaco; Nice
- First meeting: 8 November 1953; Division 1 Monaco 0–3 Nice
- Latest meeting: 8 February 2026; Ligue 1 Nice 0–0 Monaco
- Stadiums: Stade Louis II (Monaco); Allianz Riviera (Nice)

Statistics
- Most wins: Monaco (58)
- Top scorer: Delio Onnis (14)
- All-time series: Monaco: 58; Drawn: 35; Nice: 37
- Largest victory: Nice 6–0 Monaco; Division 1 (9 April 1961)

The Derby de la Côte d'Azur is a football match contested between Ligue 1 clubs AS Monaco and OGC Nice. The name of the derby derives from the fact that Monaco and Nice are the two major clubs in France that are situated on or near the Côte d'Azur, known in English as the French Riviera. The derby may also refer to matches involving AS Cannes, however since the club's downfall into the amateur divisions, the derby has only been contested by Monaco and Nice.

== Background ==
The rivalry between Monaco and Nice is a geographic one, first of all, the two cities being separated by only 20 kilometres. Furthermore, Nice and Monaco have competed many years together in Division 1, including nine years in-a-row from 2002 to 2011 and both are among the most important football clubs in France (Nice won four championships and three cups, while Monaco won eight championships and five cups). The rivalry is intensified by Monaco being the dominant club in the direct meetings, having more money and being a more frequent presence in the European football.

However, the rivalry between these two clubs is not without passion and would sometimes even end up in violent clashes between fans of both teams.

== Statistics ==
As of 8 February 2026

Competition	Matches	Wins		Draws	Goals	
Competition	Matches	Monaco	Nice	Draws	Monaco	Nice
Ligue 1	110	47	33	30	149	132
Coupe de France	16	9	3	4	22	9
Coupe de la Ligue	3	1	1	1	4	4
Trophée des Champions	1	1	0	0	5	2
All matches	130	58	37	35	180	147
