= Yllan Okou =

French footballer (born 2002)

Personal information
- Date of birth: 23 December 2002 (age 23)
- Place of birth: Poitiers, France
- Height: 1.89 m (6 ft 2 in)
- Position: Centre-back

Team information
- Current team: RAAL La Louvière
- Number: 99

Youth career
- –2017: Poitiers
- 2017–2021: Monaco

Senior career*
Years	Team	Apps	(Gls)
2020–2023	Monaco B	23	(4)
2022–2023	Monaco	0	(0)
2023–2025	Bastia	24	(2)
2024–2025	→ Hellas Verona (loan)	1	(0)
2025–	RAAL La Louvière	33	(1)
- * Club domestic league appearances and goals as of 11 May 2026

Yllan Okou (born 23 December 2002) is a French professional footballer who plays as a centre-back for Belgian Pro League club RAAL La Louvière.

== Early life ==
Born in Poitiers, Okou is the son of the Ivorian former rugby union player Alfred Okou. He moved to Buxerolles as a 7-year-old, whilst starting to play football with the Poitiers. There he was a close friend of Nicolas Tié, who would also end up pursuing a professional career in football at Chelsea and Vitória de Guimarães.

== Career ==
While playing his youth club football at Poitiers, Okou also joined the federal pôle espoirs of Châteauroux in 2015. After this spell in the FFF institution, he entered the Monaco academy in 2017.

Okou made his professional debut for Monaco on 2 January 2022, starting and playing every minute of a Coupe de France 3–1 away win against Quevilly-Rouen as a centre-back.

On 23 October 2023, Okou joined Ligue 2 club Bastia, signing a two-year contract with an option for a further year.

On 6 August 2025, Okou signed a three-season contract with RAAL La Louvière in Belgium.
