= 2026–27 AS Monaco FC season =

Monaco
2026–27 season
- President: Dmitry Rybolovlev
- Head coach: Filipe Luís
- Stadium: Stade Louis II
- Ligue 1: 7th
- Coupe de France: Round of 64
- UEFA Conference League: League phase
- Top goalscorer: League: Paris Brunner (4); All: Paris Brunner (8)
Home colours	Away colours	Third colours

The 2026–27 season is the 108th season in the history of Monaco, and the club's 14th consecutive season in Ligue 1. In addition to the domestic league, the club is participating in the Coupe de France and the UEFA Conference League.

== Players ==
=== Current squad ===
As of 9 September 2026

Note: Flags indicate national team as defined under FIFA eligibility rules; some limited exceptions apply. Players may hold more than one non-FIFA nationality.

No.	Pos.	Nation	Player
1	GK	FIN	Lukas Hradecky
2	DF	BRA	Vanderson
4	DF	NED	Jordan Teze
6	MF	SUI	Denis Zakaria (captain)
7	FW	FRA	Mathys Detourbet (on loan from Manchester City)
8	MF	SEN	Lamine Camara
9	FW	USA	Folarin Balogun
10	MF	RUS	Aleksandr Golovin (vice-captain)
11	FW	FRA	Matthis Abline
13	DF	FRA	Christian Mawissa
14	FW	DEN	Mika Biereth
15	DF	ENG	Eric Dier
16	GK	SUI	Philipp Köhn
17	MF	COD	Stanis Idumbo
18	MF	JPN	Takumi Minamino

No.	Pos.	Nation	Player
19	MF	FRA	Pape Cabral
20	DF	POR	Flávio Nazinho
22	DF	GHA	Mohammed Salisu
28	MF	FRA	Mamadou Coulibaly
29	FW	GER	Paris Brunner
31	FW	ESP	Ansu Fati
37	MF	FRA	Edan Diop
40	GK	FRA	Jules Stawiecki
41	MF	FRA	Aymen Assab
42	FW	CIV	Oumar Konaté
44	DF	BEL	Samuel Nibombé
46	MF	MAR	Anis Soubeir
47	FW	MAR	Safouane Benzahra
49	DF	FRA	Ilane Touré
72	DF	SEN	Sadibou Sané

== Transfers ==
=== In ===
No.	Pos.	Player	Transferred from	Fee	Date	Source
20	DF	(Portugal) Flávio Nazinho	(Belgium) Cercle Brugge	Transfer	30 June 2026	
31	MF	(Spain) Ansu Fati	(Spain) FC Barcelona	Transfer	30 June 2026	
7	MF	(France) Mathys Detourbet	(England) Manchester City	End of season loan	2 July 2026	
72	DF	(Senegal) Sadibou Sané	(France) FC Metz	Transfer	8 July 2026	
11	FW	(France) Matthis Abline	(France) FC Nantes	Transfer	30 July 2026	

=== Out ===
Pos.	Player	Transferred to	Fee	Date	Source
MF	(France) Lucas Michal	(Belgium) Cercle Brugge	End of season loan		
DF	(Ivory Coast) Valy Konaté	(Belgium) Cercle Brugge	Loan extended	June 2026	
DF	(Brazil) Caio Henrique	(Netherlands) Ajax	€14,000,000 (Note: Also including performance relating add-ons)	28 June 2026	
DF	(France) Kassoum Ouattara	(Turkey) Beşiktaş	Transfer	2 July 2026	
GK	(Poland) Radosław Majecki	(Cyprus) Pafos	End of season loan	17 July 2026	
MF	(France) Aladji Bamba	(England) Newcastle United	Transfer	24 July 2026	
MF	(France) Maghnes Akliouche	(France) Paris Saint-Germain	Transfer	6 August 2026	
MF	(France) Paul Pogba			19 August 2026	
DF	(Germany) Thilo Kehrer	(Netherlands) Ajax	End of season loan	2 September 2026	
GK	(France) Yann Lienard	(Belgium) Cercle Brugge	End of season loan	3 September 2026	

== Competitions ==
=== Overall record ===
Competition	First match	Last match	Starting round	Final position	Record							
Competition	First match	Last match	Starting round	Final position	Pld	W	D	L	GF	GA	GD	Win %
Ligue 1	23 August 2026	29 May 2027	Matchday 1	TBD	10	4	4	2	13	11	+2	40.00
Coupe de France	18–21 December 2026	TBD	Round of 64	TBD	0	0	0	0	0	0	+0	—
UEFA Conference League	20 August 2026	TBD	Play-off round	TBD	5	5	0	0	12	4	+8	100.00
Total					15	9	4	2	25	15	+10	60.00

Last updated: 1 November 2026
Source: Soccerway

=== Ligue 1 ===
==== League table ====
Pos	Team	Pld	W	D	L	GF	GA	GD	Pts	Qualification or relegation
6	Brest	11	5	3	3	19	12	+7	18	Qualification for the Conference League play-off round
7	Nice	11	5	2	4	17	15	+2	17	
8	Monaco	11	4	5	2	14	12	+2	17	
9	Rennes	10	5	1	4	21	21	0	16	
10	Lorient	10	4	3	3	9	8	+1	15	

Updated to match(es) played on 21 November 2026. Source: Ligue 1
Rules for classification: 1) Points; 2) Goal difference; 3) Head-to-head points; 4) Head-to-head goal difference; 5) Goals scored; 6) Wins; 7) Away wins; 8) Fair-play points; 9) Drawing of lots.
(Note: Head-to-head record is used only after all the matches between the teams in question have been played).

==== Results summary ====
Overall								Home						Away					
Pld	W	D	L	GF	GA	GD	Pts	W	D	L	GF	GA	GD	W	D	L	GF	GA	GD
11	4	5	2	14	12	+2	17	2	3	0	8	5	+3	2	2	2	6	7	−1

Last updated: 22 November 2026.
Source: Ligue 1

==== Results by round ====
Round	1	2	3	4	5	6	7	8	9	10	11	12	13	14	15	16	17	18	19	20	21	22	23	24	25	26	27	28	29	30	31	32	33	34
Ground	A	H	A	A	H	H	A	H	A	A	H	A	H	A	H	H	A	H	A	A	H	A	H	A	H	A	H	H	A	H	A	H	A	H
Result	W	W	W	D	W	D	L	D	L	D	D																							
Position	5	1	1	2	1	1	5	4	7	7																								

Updated to match(es) played on 21 November 2026. Source: Ligue 1
A = Away; H = Home; W = Win; D = Draw; L = Loss

==== Matches ====
The match schedule was released on 10 June 2026.

23 August 2026 1	Le Havre	0–1	Monaco	Le Havre
17:15 CEST (UTC+2)	Richardson (yellow card) 20'; Doucouré (yellow card) 35'; Sasso (yellow card) 44'	Report	Dier 14'; Golovin (yellow card) 64'; Vanderson (yellow card) 66'	Stadium: Stade Océane; Attendance: 18,956; Referee: Jérémie Pignard

30 August 2026 2	Monaco	2–0	Marseille	Monaco
20:45 CEST (UTC+2)	Brunner 13', 53'; Zakaria (yellow card) 42'; Camara (yellow card) 43'; Nazinho (yellow card) 88'; Hradecky (yellow card) 90+2'	Report		Stadium: Stade Louis II; Attendance: 7,080; Referee: Willy Delajod

4 September 2026 3	Paris Saint-Germain	1–2	Monaco	Paris
21:05 CEST (UTC+2)	Marquinhos 31'; Hernandez (yellow card) 68'	Report	Nazinho 58'; Teze (yellow card) 68'; Idumbo 72'	Stadium: Parc des Princes; Attendance: 46,945; Referee: Jérôme Brisard

12 September 2026 4	Strasbourg	1–1	Monaco	Strasbourg
17:15 CEST (UTC+2)	Sané 52' (o.g.); Diop (yellow card) 78'	Report	Brunner 71'; Golovin (yellow card) 90'	Stadium: Stade de la Meinau; Attendance: 30,770; Referee: Eric Wattellier

18 September 2026 5	Monaco	2–1	Lens	Monaco
20:45 CEST (UTC+2)	Brunner 32'; Camara (yellow card) 71'; Gradit 84' (o.g.)	Report	Thauvin (yellow card) 53'; Udol 57'	Stadium: Stade Louis II; Attendance: 8,035; Referee: Clément Turpin

10 October 2026 6	Monaco	2–2	Toulouse	Monaco
20:45 CEST (UTC+2)	Diop 29'; Abline 38'; Nazinho (yellow card) 47'; Golovin (yellow card) 54'	Report	Tengstedt 48'; Oppong 59', (yellow card) 90+3'; Cásseres Jr. (yellow card) 70'	Stadium: Stade Louis II; Attendance: 5,294; Referee: Ruddy Buquet

18 October 2026 7	Lorient	1–0	Monaco	Lorient
17:15 CEST (UTC+2)	Cadiou 61' (pen.), (yellow card) 66'; Kouassi (yellow card) 76'	Report	Salisu (yellow card) 57'; Zakaria (yellow card) 60'; Nazinho (yellow card) 60'; Mawissa (yellow card) 80'	Stadium: Stade du Moustoir; Attendance: 15,626; Referee: Marc Bollengier

25 October 2026 8	Monaco	1–1	Lille	Monaco
15:00 CEST (UTC+2)	Coulibaly (yellow card) 32'; Detourbet (yellow card) 56'; Diop 74'; Vanderson (yellow card) 90+1'	Report	Mbappé 24'; Haraldsson (yellow card) 34'; Nianzou (red card) 66'; Perraud (yellow card) 66'; Goffi (yellow card) 90+2'; Özer (yellow card) 90+4'	Stadium: Stade Louis II; Attendance: 11,041; Referee: François Letexier

1 November 2026 9	Paris FC	3–1	Monaco	Paris
17:15 CET (UTC+1)	Sinayoko 38', 44'; Pagis 74', (yellow card) 88'; Traoré (yellow card) 85'	Report	Balogun 76'; Vanderson (yellow card) 68'; Camara (yellow card) 88'	Stadium: Stade Jean-Bouin; Attendance: 19,087; Referee: Jérémy Stinat

8 November 2026 10	Le Mans	1–1	Monaco	Le Mans
17:15 CET (UTC+1)	Colas 90'	Report	Coulibaly 40'	Stadium: Stade Marie-Marvingt; Attendance: 21,462; Referee: Bastien Dechepy

21 November 2026 11	Monaco	1–1	Auxerre	Monaco
20:45 CET (UTC+1)	Diop 82'	Report	Faivre 29'; Nardi (yellow card) 90+5'	Stadium: Stade Louis II; Referee: Jérémy Stinat

29 November 2026 12	Lyon	v	Monaco	Décines-Charpieu
20:45 CET (UTC+1)		Report		Stadium: Parc Olympique Lyonnais

5 December 2026 13	Monaco	v	Angers	Monaco
20:45 CET (UTC+1)		Report		Stadium: Stade Louis II

13 December 2026 14	Rennes	v	Monaco	Rennes
17:15 CET (UTC+1)		Report		Stadium: Roazhon Park

2 January 2027 15	Monaco	v	Nice	Monaco
21:00 CET (UTC+1)		Report		Stadium: Stade Louis II

17 January 2027 16	Monaco	v	Brest	Monaco
17:15 CET (UTC+1)		Report		Stadium: Stade Louis II

22 January 2027 17	Troyes	v	Monaco	Troyes
20:45 CET (UTC+1)		Report		Stadium: Stade de l'Aube

30 January 2027 18	Monaco	v	Paris Saint-Germain	Monaco
17:15 CET (UTC+1)		Report		Stadium: Stade Louis II

6 February 2027 19	Auxerre	v	Monaco	Auxerre
--:-- CET (UTC+1)		Report		Stadium: Stade de l'Abbé-Deschamps

13 February 2027 20	Toulouse	v	Monaco	Toulouse
--:-- CET (UTC+1)		Report		Stadium: Stadium de Toulouse

20 February 2027 21	Monaco	v	Le Mans	Monaco
--:-- CET (UTC+1)		Report		Stadium: Stade Louis II

27 February 2027 22	Brest	v	Monaco	Brest
--:-- CET (UTC+1)		Report		Stadium: Stade Francis-Le Blé

6 March 2027 23	Monaco	v	Lyon	Monaco
--:-- CET (UTC+1)		Report		Stadium: Stade Louis II

13 March 2027 24	Marseille	v	Monaco	Marseille
--:-- CET (UTC+1)		Report		Stadium: Stade Vélodrome

20 March 2027 25	Monaco	v	Le Havre	Monaco
--:-- CET (UTC+1)		Report		Stadium: Stade Louis II

3 April 2027 26	Angers	v	Monaco	Angers
--:-- CEST (UTC+2)		Report		Stadium: Stade Raymond Kopa

10 April 2027 27	Monaco	v	Rennes	Monaco
--:-- CEST (UTC+2)		Report		Stadium: Stade Louis II

17 April 2027 28	Monaco	v	Strasbourg	Monaco
--:-- CEST (UTC+2)		Report		Stadium: Stade Louis II

24 April 2027 29	Lille	v	Monaco	Villeneuve-d'Ascq
--:-- CEST (UTC+2)		Report		Stadium: Stade Pierre-Mauroy

1 May 2027 30	Monaco	v	Lorient	Monaco
--:-- CEST (UTC+2)		Report		Stadium: Stade Louis II

8 May 2027 31	Lens	v	Monaco	Lens
--:-- CEST (UTC+2)		Report		Stadium: Stade Bollaert-Delelis

16 May 2027 32	Monaco	v	Paris FC	Monaco
--:-- CEST (UTC+2)		Report		Stadium: Stade Louis II

22 May 2027 33	Nice	v	Monaco	Nice
21:00 CEST (UTC+2)		Report		Stadium: Allianz Riviera

29 May 2027 34	Monaco	v	Troyes	Monaco
21:00 CEST (UTC+2)		Report		Stadium: Stade Louis II

=== UEFA Conference League ===
==== Play-off round ====
The draw for the play-off round was held on 3 August 2026.

20 August 2026 First leg	Górnik Zabrze (Poland)	2–3	(France) Monaco	Zabrze, Poland
20:00 CEST (UTC+2)	Prekop 53'; Dietz (yellow card) 70'; Liseth 74'; Janža (yellow card) 90+4'	Report	Biereth 9'; Detourbet (yellow card) 38'; Camara 51'; Brunner 58'; Soubeir (yellow card) 61'	Stadium: Arena Zabrze; Attendance: 23,027; Referee: Martin Matoša (Slovenia)

27 August 2026 Second leg	Monaco (France)	4–1 (7–3 agg.)	(Poland) Górnik Zabrze	Monaco
18:45 CEST (UTC+2)	Brunner 30'; Coulibaly 43'; Golovin 50'; Biereth 78'	Report	Dietz (yellow card) 33'; Khlan (yellow card) 52'; Antiste 83'	Stadium: Stade Louis II; Attendance: 6,195; Referee: Vasilios Fotias (Greece)

==== League phase ====
The draw for the league phase was held on 28 August 2026.

Pos	Team	Pld	W	D	L	GF	GA	GD	Pts	Qualification
2	(Greece) Panathinaikos	3	3	0	0	9	3	+6	9	Advance to round of 16 (seeded)
3	(Netherlands) Twente	3	3	0	0	8	2	+6	9	Advance to round of 16 (seeded)
4	(France) Monaco	3	3	0	0	7	1	+6	9	Advance to round of 16 (seeded)
5	(England) Brighton & Hove Albion	3	2	1	0	5	0	+5	7	Advance to round of 16 (seeded)
6	(Norway) Brann	3	2	1	0	7	3	+4	7	Advance to round of 16 (seeded)

Updated to match(es) played on 5 November 2026. Source: UEFA
Rules for classification: League phase tiebreakers

Round	1	2	3	4	5	6
Ground	A	H	H	A	A	H
Result	W	W	W			
Position	9	6				
Points	3	6	9			

Updated to match(es) played on 5 November 2026. Source: UEFA
A = Away; H = Home; W = Win; D = Draw; L = Loss

15 October 2026 1	CSKA Sofia (Bulgaria)	1–2	(France) Monaco	Sofia, Bulgaria
19:45 EEST (UTC+3)	Sensi (yellow card) 51'; Ebong (yellow card) 69'; Zwarts 76'; Martino (yellow card) 90+5'	Report	Brunner 3'; Fati 43'; Diop (yellow card) 78'	Stadium: Vasil Levski National Stadium; Attendance: 22,025; Referee: João Gonçalves (Portugal)
Note: The match was played at Vasil Levski National Stadium in Sofia, instead of CSKA Sofia's regular stadium, Stadion Balgarska Armia, due to renovation works.

22 October 2026 2	Monaco (France)	3–0	(Germany) SC Freiburg	Monaco
21:00 CEST (UTC+2)	Brunner 45+2'; Golovin (yellow card) 49'; Soubeir (yellow card) 70'; Camara 83'; Fati (yellow card) 86', (goal) 90+2'	Report	Osterhage (yellow card) 37'	Stadium: Stade Louis II; Attendance: 4,783; Referee: Sam Barrott (England)

5 November 2026 3	Monaco (France)	2–0	(Denmark) Nordsjælland	Monaco
21:00 CET (UTC+1)	Touré (yellow card) 17'; Detourbet 33'; Abline 90+1'	Report	Markmann (yellow card) 30'; Nelsson (yellow card) 66'	Stadium: Stade Louis II; Referee: Antoni Bandić (Bosnia and Herzegovina)

26 November 2026 4	Heart of Midlothian (Scotland)	v	(France) Monaco	Edinburgh, Scotland
17:45 GMT (UTC+0)		Report		Stadium: Tynecastle Park

10 December 2026 5	Brighton & Hove Albion (England)	v	(France) Monaco	Brighton and Hove, England
20:00 GMT (UTC+0)		Report		Stadium: Falmer Stadium

17 December 2026 6	Monaco (France)	v	(Gibraltar) Lincoln Red Imps	Monaco
21:00 CET (UTC+1)		Report		Stadium: Stade Louis II

== Statistics ==
=== Appearances and goals ===
No.	Pos	Nat	Player	Total		Ligue 1		Coupe de France		UEFA Conference League	
No.	Pos	Nat	Player	Apps	Goals	Apps	Goals	Apps	Goals	Apps	Goals
Goalkeepers
1	GK	(Finland) FIN	Lukas Hradecky	13	0	9	0	0	0	4	0
16	GK	(Switzerland) SUI	Philipp Köhn	0	0	0	0	0	0	0	0
40	GK	(France) FRA	Jules Stawiecki	0	0	0	0	0	0	0	0
50	GK	(France) FRA	Yann Lienard	0	0	0	0	0	0	0	0
Defenders
2	DF	(Brazil) BRA	Vanderson	12	0	9	0	0	0	3	0
4	DF	(Netherlands) NED	Jordan Teze	7	0	1+3	0	0	0	2+1	0
13	DF	(France) FRA	Christian Mawissa	6	0	0+3	0	0	0	3	0
15	DF	(England) ENG	Eric Dier	9	1	7	1	0	0	2	0
20	DF	(Portugal) POR	Flávio Nazinho	13	1	9	1	0	0	1+3	0
22	DF	(Ghana) GHA	Mohammed Salisu	3	0	1+1	0	0	0	1	0
44	DF	(Belgium) BEL	Samuel Nibombé	0	0	0	0	0	0	0	0
49	DF	(France) FRA	Ilane Touré	2	0	0+1	0	0	0	0+1	0
72	DF	(Senegal) SEN	Sadibou Sané	13	0	9	0	0	0	4	0
Midfielders
6	MF	(Switzerland) SUI	Denis Zakaria	13	0	9	0	0	0	2+2	0
8	MF	(Senegal) SEN	Lamine Camara	13	2	9	0	0	0	4	2
10	MF	(Russia) RUS	Aleksandr Golovin	12	1	9	0	0	0	2+1	1
17	MF	(Belgium) BEL	Stanis Idumbo	8	1	4+1	1	0	0	3	0
19	MF	(France) FRA	Pape Cabral	1	0	0+1	0	0	0	0	0
28	MF	(France) FRA	Mamadou Coulibaly	6	1	4	0	0	0	2	1
37	MF	(France) FRA	Edan Diop	7	2	3+2	2	0	0	2	0
46	MF	(Morocco) MAR	Anis Soubeir	8	0	1+3	0	0	0	0+4	0
Forwards
7	FW	(France) FRA	Mathys Detourbet	10	0	1+6	0	0	0	2+1	0
9	FW	(United States) USA	Folarin Balogun	5	1	0+5	1	0	0	0	0
11	FW	(France) FRA	Matthis Abline	10	1	4+4	1	0	0	0+2	0
14	FW	(Denmark) DEN	Mika Biereth	5	2	0+3	0	0	0	1+1	2
18	FW	(Japan) JPN	Takumi Minamino	3	0	1+1	0	0	0	1	0
29	FW	(Germany) GER	Paris Brunner	11	8	7	4	0	0	4	4
31	FW	(Spain) ESP	Ansu Fati	5	2	2+1	0	0	0	1+1	2
42	FW	(Ivory Coast) CIV	Oumar Konaté	2	0	0+1	0	0	0	0+1	0
47	FW	(Morocco) MAR	Safouane Benzahra	4	0	0+2	0	0	0	0+2	0
Players transferred out during the season
5	DF	(Germany) GER	Thilo Kehrer	1	0	0+1	0	0	0	0	0

Last updated: 1 November 2026
Source: Competitions
