= 2023–24 AS Monaco FC season =

Monaco
2023–24 season
- President: Dmitry Rybolovlev
- Head coach: Adi Hütter
- Stadium: Stade Louis II
- Ligue 1: 2nd
- Coupe de France: Round of 16
- Top goalscorer: League: Wissam Ben Yedder (16); All: Wissam Ben Yedder (20)
- Highest home attendance: 14,700
- Average home league attendance: 7,518
Home colours	Away colours	Third colours

The 2023–24 season was the 99th season in the history of AS Monaco FC and their 11th consecutive season in the top flight. The club participated in Ligue 1 and the Coupe de France.

== Players ==
=== First-team squad ===
As of 5 January 2024

No.	Pos.	Nation	Player
1	GK	POL	Radosław Majecki
2	DF	BRA	Vanderson
3	DF	CHI	Guillermo Maripán
4	MF	MLI	Mohamed Camara
5	DF	GER	Thilo Kehrer
6	MF	SUI	Denis Zakaria
7	MF	MAR	Eliesse Ben Seghir
8	MF	BEL	Eliot Matazo
9	FW	NED	Myron Boadu
10	FW	FRA	Wissam Ben Yedder (captain)
12	DF	BRA	Caio Henrique
14	DF	SEN	Ismail Jakobs
16	GK	SUI	Philipp Köhn
17	MF	RUS	Aleksandr Golovin (3rd captain)

No.	Pos.	Nation	Player
18	MF	JPN	Takumi Minamino
19	MF	FRA	Youssouf Fofana (vice-captain)
20	DF	FRA	Kassoum Ouattara
21	MF	FRA	Maghnes Akliouche
22	DF	GHA	Mohammed Salisu
27	FW	SEN	Krépin Diatta
29	FW	USA	Folarin Balogun
34	DF	FRA	Chrislain Matsima
36	FW	SUI	Breel Embolo
37	MF	FRA	Edan Diop
50	GK	FRA	Yann Lienard
88	MF	FRA	Soungoutou Magassa
99	DF	CIV	Wilfried Singo

== Transfers ==
=== In ===
No.	Pos.	Player	Transferred from	Fee	Date	Source
16	GK	(Switzerland) Philipp Köhn	(Austria) Red Bull Salzburg	Undisclosed	15 July 2023	
22	DF	(Ghana) Mohammed Salisu	(England) Southampton	€15,000,000	1 August 2023	
6	MF	(Switzerland) Denis Zakaria	(Italy) Juventus	€20,000,000	14 August 2023	
99	DF	(Ivory Coast) Wilfried Singo	(Italy) Torino	Undisclosed	17 August 2023	
29	FW	(United States) Folarin Balogun	(England) Arsenal	€35,000,000	30 August 2023	
20	DF	(France) Kassoum Ouattara	(France) Amiens	€2,000,000	1 November 2023	
5	DF	(Germany) Thilo Kehrer	(England) West Ham United	Loan	5 January 2024	

=== Out ===
No.	Pos.	Player	Transferred to	Fee	Date	Source
	FW	(Netherlands) Anthony Musaba	(England) Sheffield Wednesday	Undisclosed	3 August 2023	
6	DF	(France) Axel Disasi	(England) Chelsea	€45,000,000	4 August 2023	
31	FW	(Germany) Kevin Volland	(Germany) Union Berlin	€4,000,000	17 August 2023	
26	DF	(France) Ruben Aguilar	(France) Lens	Undisclosed	1 September 2023	
	MF	(France) Félix Lemaréchal	(Belgium) Cercle Brugge	Loan	1 September 2023	
77	FW	(Portugal) Gelson Martins	(Greece) Olympiacos	€3,000,000	2 January 2024	
45	FW	(France) Malamine Efekele	(Belgium) Cercle Brugge	Loan	24 January 2024	

== Pre-season and friendlies ==
Win Draw Loss Fixtures

9 July 2023 Friendly	Monaco	1-1	Union Saint-Gilloise	La Turbie
11:00 CEST (UTC+2)	Martins 74'	Report	Boniface 42'	Stadium: Monaco Training Center

15 July 2023 Friendly	Cercle Brugge	3-0	Monaco	Bruges
17:00 CEST (UTC+2)	Somers 29', 51'; Gboho 62'	Report		Stadium: Jan Breydel Stadium

19 July 2023 Friendly	Real Betis	1-3	Monaco	Burton upon Trent
19:00 BST (UTC+1)	Garcia 29'	Report	Volland 56', 66'; Minamino 76'	Stadium: St George's Park

22 July 2023 Friendly	Leeds United	0-2	Monaco	York
16:00 BST (UTC+1)		Report	Ben Yedder 60'; Volland 78'	Stadium: LNER Community Stadium; Attendance: 8,209

28 July 2023 Friendly	Bologna	2–3	Monaco	Bologna
18:00 CEST (UTC+2)	Raimondo 5'; Ferguson 13'	Report	Golovin 54', 75'; Maripán 90'	Stadium: Centro tecnico Niccolò Galli

29 July 2023 Friendly	Genoa	1-0	Monaco	Genoa
20:30 CEST (UTC+2)	Guðmundsson 17'	Report	Camara (yellow card) 54'	Stadium: Stadio Luigi Ferraris

2 August 2023 Emirates Cup	Arsenal	1-1 (5-4 p)	Monaco	London
18:00 BST (UTC+2)	Saliba (yellow card) 26'; Nketiah 43'; Gabriel (yellow card) 67'	Report	Fofana 30'	Stadium: Emirates Stadium

7 August 2023 Friendly	Bayern Munich	4-2	Monaco	Unterhaching
17:00 CEST (UTC+2)	Laimer 32'; Musiala 42'; Gnabry 45+2'; Sané 68'	Report	Minamino 30'; Camara (yellow card) 57'; Ben Yedder 64'; Magassa (yellow card) 90'	Stadium: Alpenbauer Sportpark; Attendance: 10,872; Referee: Robert Hartmann

== Competitions ==
=== Overall record ===
Competition	First match	Last match	Starting round	Final position	Record							
Competition	First match	Last match	Starting round	Final position	Pld	W	D	L	GF	GA	GD	Win %
Ligue 1	13 August 2023	19 May 2024	Matchday 1	2nd	34	20	7	7	68	42	+26	58.82
Coupe de France	7 January 2024	8 February 2024	Round of 64	Round of 16	3	1	2	0	6	4	+2	33.33
Total					37	21	9	7	74	46	+28	56.76

Source: Soccerway

=== Ligue 1 ===
==== League table ====
Pos	Team	Pld	W	D	L	GF	GA	GD	Pts	Qualification or relegation
1	Paris Saint-Germain (C)	34	22	10	2	81	33	+48	76	Qualification for the Champions League league phase
2	Monaco	34	20	7	7	68	42	+26	67	Qualification for the Champions League league phase
3	Brest	34	17	10	7	53	34	+19	61	Qualification for the Champions League league phase
4	Lille	34	16	11	7	52	34	+18	59	Qualification for the Champions League third qualifying round
5	Nice	34	15	10	9	40	29	+11	55	Qualification for the Europa League league phase (Note: Since the 2023–24 Coupe de France winners, Paris Saint-Germain, qualified for the Champions League via league position, the Europa League berth awarded to the cup winners was passed to the sixth-placed team and the Conference League berth was passed to the seventh-placed team.)

Source: Ligue 1
Rules for classification: 1) Points; 2) Goal difference; 3) Head-to-head points; 4) Head-to-head goal difference; 5) Head-to-head goals scored; 6) Head-to-head away goals scored; 7) Goals scored; 8) Away goals scored; 9) Fair-play points (Note: Head-to-head record is used only after all the matches between the teams in question have been played).
(C) Champions

==== Results summary ====
Overall								Home						Away					
Pld	W	D	L	GF	GA	GD	Pts	W	D	L	GF	GA	GD	W	D	L	GF	GA	GD
34	20	7	7	68	42	+26	67	10	3	4	30	14	+16	10	4	3	38	28	+10

Source: Ligue 1

==== Results by round ====
Round	1	2	3	4	5	6	7	8	9	10	11	12	13	14	15	16	17	18	19	20	21	22	23	24	25	26	27	28	29	30	31	32	33	34
Ground	A	H	A	H	A	H	H	A	H	A	H	A	A	H	A	H	A	H	A	H	A	H	A	H	A	H	A	H	H	A	A	H	A	H
Result	W	W	D	W	D	L	W	W	W	L	W	D	L	W	W	L	W	L	D	D	W	L	W	D	W	D	W	W	W	W	L	W	W	W
Position	2	1	1	1	1	4	1	1	1	3	3	3	3	3	3	3	3	4	4	5	3	5	3	3	3	3	3	3	3	2	2	2	2	2

Source: Ligue 1
A = Away; H = Home; W = Win; D = Draw; L = Loss

==== Matches ====
The league fixtures were announced on 29 June 2023.

13 August 2023 1	Clermont	2–4	Monaco	Clermont-Ferrand
15:00 CEST (UTC+2)	Wieteska 7'; Cham 53'	Report	Magassa (yellow card) 21'; Vanderson 26'; Camara (yellow card) 35'; Ben Yedder 43', 70'; Akliouche 90+3', (yellow card) 90+5'; Matazo (yellow card) 90+8'	Stadium: Stade Gabriel Montpied; Attendance: 10,450; Referee: François Letexier

20 August 2023 2	Monaco	3–0	Strasbourg	Monaco
19:00 CEST (UTC+2)	Minamino 20', 36'; Golovin (yellow card) 35'; Camara (yellow card) 47'; Ben Yedder 58'	Report	Bellegarde (yellow card) 85'	Stadium: Stade Louis II; Attendance: 10,072; Referee: Ruddy Buquet
Note: The match was originally scheduled for 17:00 CEST, but was postponed by two hours due to the heat wave in Monaco.

25 August 2023 3	Nantes	3–3	Monaco	Nantes
21:00 CEST (UTC+2)	Mohamed 5' (pen.), 48'; Castelletto (yellow card) 7', (goal) 14'; Moutoussamy (yellow card) 64'	Report	Singo (yellow card) 9'; Minamino 27'; Golovin (yellow card) 54'; Ben Yedder 59'; Boadu 85'	Stadium: Stade de la Beaujoire; Attendance: 28,429; Referee: Jérémie Pignard

2 September 2023 4	Monaco	3–0	Lens	Monaco
21:00 CEST (UTC+2)	Singo 24'; Magassa (yellow card) 33'; Golovin 36'; Camara (yellow card) 47'; Vanderson (yellow card) 52'; Maripán 59'; Balogun (yellow card) 78'	Report	Spierings (yellow card) 23'; Medina (yellow card) 64'	Stadium: Stade Louis II; Attendance: 9,402; Referee: Willy Delajod

17 September 2023 5	Lorient	2–2	Monaco	Lorient
13:00 CEST (UTC+2)	Aiyegun 2'; Faivre 90+8'	Report	Golovin 17', (yellow card) 90+8'; Zakaria (yellow card) 68'; Balogun 69'	Stadium: Stade du Moustoir; Attendance: 15,247; Referee: Marc Bollengier

22 September 2023 6	Monaco	0–1	Nice	Monaco
21:00 CEST (UTC+2)	Balogun (penalty missed) 12', 55'; Golovin (yellow card) 72'	Report	Ndayishimiye (yellow card) 56'; Boga 90+1'	Stadium: Stade Louis II; Attendance: 10,075; Referee: Benoît Millot

30 September 2023 7	Monaco	3–2	Marseille	Monaco
21:00 CEST (UTC+2)	Akliouche 8', 52'; Balogun 23'; Fofana (yellow card) 42'; Zakaria (yellow card) 59'; Matazo (yellow card) 77'; Magassa (yellow card) 90+2'	Report	Ndiaye 1'; Gigot 18', (yellow card) 59'; Correa (yellow card) 54'; Clauss (yellow card) 73'; Rongier (yellow card) 77'	Stadium: Stade Louis II; Attendance: 9,912; Referee: Benoît Bastien

7 October 2023 8	Reims	1–3	Monaco	Reims
21:00 CEST (UTC+2)	Teuma 57' (pen.)	Report	Jakobs 42'; Balogun 46'; Ben Yedder 49'; Zakaria (yellow card) 83'; Matsima (yellow card) 84'; Diatta (yellow card) 90+5'	Stadium: Stade Auguste Delaune; Attendance: 19,000; Referee: Hakim Ben El Hadj

22 October 2023 9	Monaco	2–1	Metz	Monaco
17:05 CEST (UTC+2)	Golovin 43', 55'; Matsima (yellow card) 67'	Report	Camara 4', (yellow card) 53'; Tetteh (yellow card) 66'; N'Duquidi (yellow card) 74'	Stadium: Stade Louis II; Attendance: 6,197; Referee: Romain Lissorgue

29 October 2023 10	Lille	2–0	Monaco	Villeneuve-d'Ascq
15:00 CET (UTC+1)	Cavaleiro 32'; Diakité 42'; Yazıcı (yellow card) 67'	Report	Singo (yellow card) 48'; Zakaria (yellow card) 50'	Stadium: Stade Pierre-Mauroy; Attendance: 40,046; Referee: Clément Turpin

5 November 2023 11	Monaco	2–0	Brest	Monaco
17:05 CET (UTC+1)	Zakaria 17'; Golovin (yellow card) 62', (goal) 70'; Fofana (yellow card) 88'	Report	Locko (yellow card) 8'; Brassier (yellow card) 62' (yellow-red card) 90+2'; Lees-Melou (yellow card) 67'	Stadium: Stade Louis II; Attendance: 9,244; Referee: Eric Wattellier

11 November 2023 12	Le Havre	0–0	Monaco	Le Havre
21:00 CET (UTC+1)	Bayo (yellow card) 10'; Touré (yellow card) 68'; Grandsir (penalty missed) 90+10'	Report	Zakaria (yellow card) 21'; Diop (yellow card) 90+7'; Fofana (yellow card) 90+9'	Stadium: Stade Océane; Attendance: 23,008; Referee: Thomas Léonard

24 November 2023 13	Paris Saint-Germain	5–2	Monaco	Paris
21:00 CET (UTC+1)	Ramos 18'; Mbappé 39' (pen.); Dembélé 70'; Vitinha 72'; Kolo Muani 90+6'	Report	Minamino 22'; Singo (yellow card) 59'; Balogun 75'	Stadium: Parc des Princes; Attendance: 47,896; Referee: Benoît Bastien

3 December 2023 14	Monaco	2–0	Montpellier	Monaco
15:00 CET (UTC+1)	Minamino 9'; Vanderson (yellow card) 20'; Golovin (yellow card) 75'; Ben Yedder 90+2'	Report	Savanier (yellow card) 45'; Kouyaté (red card) 69'; Chotard (yellow card) 84'; Tchato (yellow card) 90'	Stadium: Stade Louis II; Attendance: 4,599; Referee: Jérémy Stinat

9 December 2023 15	Rennes	1–2	Monaco	Rennes
17:00 CET (UTC+1)	Omari (yellow card) 38'; Theate (yellow card) 61'; Bourigeaud 90' (pen.)	Report	Camara (yellow card) 13'; Vanderson 51', (yellow card) 54' (yellow-red card) 75'; Salisu (yellow card) 62'; Zakaria (yellow card) 65'; Singo (yellow card) 69'; Fofana 85'	Stadium: Roazhon Park; Attendance: 26,856; Referee: Clément Turpin

15 December 2023 16	Monaco	0–1	Lyon	Monaco
21:00 CET (UTC+1)	Singo (yellow card) 29'	Report	Mata (yellow card) 31'; Jeffinho 85'; Henrique (yellow card) 90+5'	Stadium: Stade Louis II; Attendance: 5,324; Referee: Ruddy Buquet

20 December 2023 17	Toulouse	1–2	Monaco	Toulouse
21:00 CET (UTC+1)	Magri 5'; Costa (yellow card) 45+3'; Dønnum (yellow card) 52'	Report	Salisu (yellow card) 3'; Ben Yedder 26', 44' (pen.); Golovin (red card) 51'; Diop (yellow card) 57'; Magassa (yellow card) 66'	Stadium: Stadium de Toulouse; Attendance: 23,881; Referee: Jérôme Brisard

13 January 2024 18	Monaco	1–3	Reims	Monaco
17:00 CET (UTC+1)	Magassa (yellow card) 34'; Ben Yedder 49', (yellow card) 90+2'; Vanderson (yellow card) 82'	Report	Teuma 35'; Khadra 55'; De Smet (yellow card) 62'; Okumu (yellow card) 80'; Matusiwa 90+5'	Stadium: Stade Louis II; Attendance: 4,231; Referee: François Letexier

27 January 2024 19	Marseille	2–2	Monaco	Marseille
21:00 CET (UTC+1)	Aubameyang 38'; Balerdi 50'; Soglo (yellow card) 76'	Report	Ben Yedder 7'; Maripán (red card) 11'; Akliouche 45+4'; Zakaria (yellow card) 75' (yellow-red card) 86'; Kehrer (yellow card) 82'	Stadium: Stade Vélodrome; Attendance: 63,029; Referee: Willy Delajod

4 February 2024 20	Monaco	1–1	Le Havre	Monaco
13:00 CET (UTC+1)	Magassa (yellow card) 33'; Ben Yedder 63', (yellow card) 75'; Golovin (yellow card) 90+2'	Report	Casimir (yellow card) 51'; Joujou (yellow card) 60'; Fofana 65' (o.g.)	Stadium: Stade Louis II; Attendance: 5,962; Referee: Jérôme Brisard

11 February 2024 21	Nice	2–3	Monaco	Nice
20:45 CET (UTC+1)	Lotomba (yellow card) 33'; Laborde 37' (pen.); Dante (red card) 54'; Louchet (yellow card) 60'; Boudaoui (yellow card) 67'; Guessand 74', (yellow card) 83'; Ndayishimiye (yellow card) 90+4'	Report	Zakaria 16', 50', (yellow card) 83'; Kehrer (yellow card) 35'; Golovin (yellow card) 43', (goal) 77'; Akliouche (yellow card) 90+8'	Stadium: Allianz Riviera; Attendance: 24,788; Referee: Eric Wattellier

18 February 2024 22	Monaco	1–2	Toulouse	Monaco
15:00 CET (UTC+1)	Zakaria (yellow card) 27'; Akliouche 48'	Report	Sierro 41'; Mawissa (yellow card) 65'; Costa 70'; Dønnum (yellow card) 82'; Restes (yellow card) 90+3'	Stadium: Stade Louis II; Attendance: 4,702; Referee: Benoît Bastien

25 February 2024 23	Lens	2–3	Monaco	Lens
13:00 CET (UTC+1)	Wahi 31', (yellow card) 90+5'; Medina (yellow card) 45+3'; Thomasson (yellow card) 53'; Mendy (yellow card) 64'; Saïd 77'; Samba (yellow card) 82'	Report	Balogun 19', (penalty missed) 82'; Ouattara (yellow card) 25'; Samba 30' (o.g.); Minamino 90+2'; Diop (yellow card) 90+5'; Majecki (yellow card) 90+6'	Stadium: Stade Bollaert-Delelis; Attendance: 37,992; Referee: François Letexier

1 March 2024 24	Monaco	0–0	Paris Saint-Germain	Monaco
21:00 CET (UTC+1)		Report		Stadium: Stade Louis II; Attendance: 14,700; Referee: Ruddy Buquet

10 March 2024 25	Strasbourg	0–1	Monaco	Strasbourg
15:00 CET (UTC+1)	Doukouré (yellow card) 74'	Report	Minamino (yellow card) 5'; Singo (yellow card) 44'; Ben Seghir 72'; Golovin (yellow card) 82'	Stadium: Stade de la Meinau; Attendance: 25,391; Referee: Clément Turpin

17 March 2024 26	Monaco	2–2	Lorient	Monaco
15:00 CET (UTC+1)	F. Mendy 27' (o.g.); Minamino (yellow card) 54'; Fofana 60'; Zakaria (yellow card) 62' (yellow-red card) 81'	Report	Singo 1' (o.g.); F. Mendy (yellow card) 71'; Aiyegun (red card) 90'; Bakayoko 90+5'	Stadium: Stade Louis II; Attendance: 5,090; Referee: Bastien Dechepy

30 March 2024 27	Metz	2–5	Monaco	Longeville-lès-Metz
17:00 CET (UTC+1)	Diallo 78'; I. Sané 84'	Report	Minamino 4'; Akliouche 10'; Vanderson 16'; Balogun 76', 87'	Stadium: Stade Saint-Symphorien; Attendance: 26,661; Referee: Eric Wattellier

7 April 2024 28	Monaco	1–0	Rennes	Monaco
17:05 CEST (UTC+2)	Akliouche 25'; Kehrer (yellow card) 36' (yellow-red card) 64'; Singo (yellow card) 58'	Report	Terrier (red card) 46'; Theate (yellow card) 81'	Stadium: Stade Louis II; Attendance: 6,634; Referee: Stéphanie Frappart

21 April 2024 30	Brest	0–2	Monaco	Brest
17:05 CEST (UTC+2)	Le Cardinal (yellow card) 59'; Lala (yellow card) 69'; Camara (yellow card) 85'; Magnetti (yellow card) 90+2'; Le Douaron (yellow card) 90+6'	Report	Zakaria 40', (yellow card) 44'; Minamino 48'; Akliouche (yellow card) 65'; Ben Seghir (red card) 90+2'; Singo (red card) 90+6'	Stadium: Stade Francis-Le Blé; Attendance: 14,856; Referee: Ruddy Buquet

24 April 2024 29	Monaco	1–0	Lille	Monaco
19:00 CEST (UTC+2)	Akliouche (yellow card) 38'; Fofana 62'	Report	David (yellow card) 54'; Bouaddi (yellow card) 67'	Stadium: Stade Louis II; Attendance: 7,069; Referee: Clément Turpin
Note: The match was originally scheduled for 14 April 2024, but was postponed due to Lille's progression in the UEFA Europa Conference League.

28 April 2024 31	Lyon	3–2	Monaco	Décines-Charpieu
19:00 CEST (UTC+2)	Lacazette 22'; Benrahma 26', (yellow card) 38'; Fofana 84'	Report	Ben Yedder 2', 61'; Minamino (yellow card) 25'; Ouattara (yellow card) 47'; Diatta (yellow card) 69'	Stadium: Parc Olympique Lyonnais; Attendance: 55,939; Referee: Bastien Dechepy

4 May 2024 32	Monaco	4–1	Clermont	Monaco
17:00 CEST (UTC+2)	Minamino 16', (yellow card) 69'; Embolo 37'; Akliouche (yellow card) 51'; Ben Yedder 57', 87'; Vanderson (yellow card) 61'	Report	Cham 34'; Bouchenna (yellow card) 90'	Stadium: Stade Louis II; Attendance: 7,256; Referee: Hakim Ben El Hadj

12 May 2024 33	Montpellier	0–2	Monaco	Montpellier
21:00 CEST (UTC+2)	Ferri (yellow card) 19'	Report	Ouattara 52'; Fofana 65'; Singo (yellow card) 72'	Stadium: Stade de la Mosson; Attendance: 14,829; Referee: Stéphanie Frappart

19 May 2024 34	Monaco	4–0	Nantes	Monaco
21:00 CEST (UTC+2)	Ben Yedder 6'; Kehrer 10'; Magassa (yellow card) 21'; Camara 24' (pen.); Ben Seghir 61'	Report	Amian (yellow card) 36'; Sissoko (yellow card) 41'	Stadium: Stade Louis II; Attendance: 7,343; Referee: Romain Lissorgue

=== Coupe de France ===
7 January 2024 Round of 64	Lens	2–2 (5–6 p)	Monaco	Lens
14:30 CET (UTC+1)	Maouassa (yellow card) 23', (goal) 43'; Samba (yellow card) 45+3'; Sotoca 62'; Frankowski (yellow card) 88'	Report	Ben Yedder 1'; Akliouche 21', (yellow card) 53'; Majecki (yellow card) 79'	Stadium: Stade Bollaert-Delelis; Attendance: 37,571; Referee: Bastien Dechepy
	Penalties
	Saïd (penalty missed); Sotoca (penalty scored); Fulgini (penalty missed); Medina (penalty missed); Danso (penalty scored); Frankowski (penalty scored); Aguilar (penalty scored); El Aynaoui (penalty scored); Thomasson (penalty missed)		(penalty scored) Ben Yedder; (penalty missed) Fofana; (penalty missed) Vanderson; (penalty missed) Boadu; (penalty scored) Zakaria; (penalty scored) Maripán; (penalty scored) Diop; (penalty scored) Ouattara; (penalty scored) Magassa

20 January 2024 Round of 32	Rodez	1–3	Monaco	Rodez
17:30 CET (UTC+1)	Mambo 21'	Report	Ben Yedder 10' (pen.), 50', 58', (yellow card) 11'; Kehrer (yellow card) 28'; Ouattara (yellow card) 69'	Stadium: Stade Paul-Lignon; Attendance: 3,236; Referee: Jérémy Stinat

8 February 2024 Round of 16	Rouen	1–1 (6–5 p)	Monaco	Le Petit-Quevilly
20:45 CET (UTC+1)	Bassin 45+5'; Mion (yellow card) 58'; Aggoune (yellow card) 90+'	Report	Zakaria (yellow card) 45+3'; Balogun 35' (pen.); Akliouche (yellow card) 82'	Stadium: Stade Robert Diochon; Attendance: 9,219; Referee: Ruddy Buquet
	Penalties
	Sahloune (penalty scored); A. Allée (penalty scored); Z. Allée (penalty scored); Benzia (penalty missed); Ouadah (penalty scored); Sanson (penalty scored); Bernasque (penalty scored)		(penalty scored) Golovin; (penalty scored) Ben Seghir; (penalty scored) Fofana; (penalty scored) Kehrer; (penalty missed) Balogun; (penalty scored) Maripán; (penalty missed) Akliouche

== Statistics ==
=== Appearances and goals ===
No.	Pos	Nat	Player	Total		Ligue 1		Coupe de France	
No.	Pos	Nat	Player	Apps	Goals	Apps	Goals	Apps	Goals
Goalkeepers
1	GK	(Poland) POL	Radosław Majecki	15	0	12	0	3	0
16	GK	(Switzerland) SUI	Philipp Köhn	22	0	22	0	0	0
50	GK	(France) FRA	Yann Lienard	0	0	0	0	0	0
Defenders
2	DF	(Brazil) BRA	Vanderson	23	3	20	3	3	0
3	DF	(Chile) CHI	Guillermo Maripán	25	1	21+2	1	2	0
5	DF	(Germany) GER	Thilo Kehrer	18	1	15	1	3	0
12	DF	(Brazil) BRA	Caio Henrique	9	0	7+2	0	0	0
14	DF	(Senegal) SEN	Ismail Jakobs	22	1	16+5	1	1	0
20	DF	(France) FRA	Kassoum Ouattara	17	1	7+7	1	2+1	0
22	DF	(Ghana) GHA	Mohammed Salisu	13	0	11+1	0	1	0
41	DF	(France) FRA	Antonin Cartillier	2	0	0+1	0	0+1	0
88	DF	(France) FRA	Soungoutou Magassa	15	0	14	0	1	0
99	DF	(Ivory Coast) CIV	Wilfried Singo	25	1	24+1	1	0	0
Midfielders
4	MF	(Mali) MLI	Mohamed Camara	20	1	14+6	1	0	0
6	MF	(Switzerland) SUI	Denis Zakaria	27	4	23+1	4	3	0
7	MF	(Morocco) MAR	Eliesse Ben Seghir	14	2	4+9	2	0+1	0
17	MF	(Russia) RUS	Aleksandr Golovin	27	6	25	6	2	0
18	MF	(Japan) JPN	Takumi Minamino	31	9	25+5	9	1	0
19	MF	(France) FRA	Youssouf Fofana	34	4	30+1	4	3	0
21	MF	(France) FRA	Maghnes Akliouche	30	8	18+9	7	1+2	1
37	MF	(France) FRA	Edan Diop	12	0	0+10	0	1+1	0
42	MF	(France) FRA	Mamadou Coulibaly	6	0	1+4	0	0+1	0
45	MF	(France) FRA	Saïmon Bouabré	1	0	0+1	0	0	0
88	MF	(France) FRA	Soungoutou Magassa	6	0	1+5	0	0	0
Forwards
10	FW	(France) FRA	Wissam Ben Yedder	34	20	26+6	16	2	4
27	FW	(Senegal) SEN	Krépin Diatta	25	0	12+13	0	0	0
29	FW	(United States) USA	Folarin Balogun	32	8	19+10	7	3	1
36	FW	(Switzerland) SUI	Breel Embolo	5	1	2+3	1	0	0
47	MF	(France) FRA	Lucas Michel	1	0	0+1	0	0	0
Players transferred out during the season
23	DF	(France) FRA	Yllan Okou	0	0	0	0	0	0
26	DF	(France) FRA	Ruben Aguilar	0	0	0	0	0	0
34	DF	(France) FRA	Chrislain Matsima	6	0	3+2	0	1	0
8	MF	(Belgium) BEL	Eliot Matazo	5	0	0+5	0	0	0
77	MF	(Portugal) POR	Gelson Martins	0	0	0	0	0	0
9	FW	(Netherlands) NED	Myron Boadu	10	1	0+9	1	0+1	0

Source: Competitions
