= Jean Petit (footballer, born 1949) =

French footballer (1949–2024)

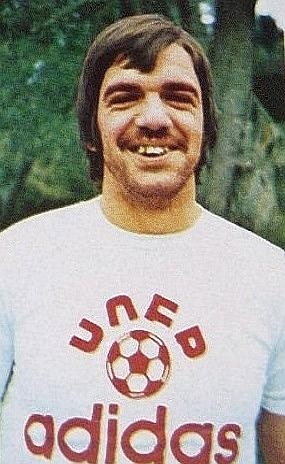
- Petit in 1974

Personal information
- Date of birth: 25 September 1949
- Place of birth: Toulouse, France
- Date of death: 23 January 2024 (aged 74)
- Height: 1.74 m (5 ft 9 in)
- Position: Midfielder

Youth career
- 1958–1967: Toulouse
- 1967–1969: Luchon

Senior career*
Years	Team	Apps	(Gls)
1969–1982	Monaco	428	(76)

International career
1977–1980	France	12	(1)

Managerial career
- 1987–1994: Monaco (assistant)
- 1994: Monaco (caretaker)
- 1994–2005: Monaco (assistant)
- 2005: Monaco (caretaker)
- 2011–2014: Monaco (assistant)
- * Club domestic league appearances and goals

Jean Petit (French: [ʒɑ̃ pəti]; 25 September 1949 – 23 January 2024) was a French football midfielder, who earned twelve international caps (one goal) for the France national team during the late 1970s. Petit played much of his professional career for AS Monaco, with whom he won the French title in 1978. He was a member of the France team in the 1978 FIFA World Cup. Petit died on 23 January 2024, at the age of 74.
