= Ilane Touré =

French footballer (born 2006)

Personal information
- Date of birth: 4 August 2006 (age 20)
- Place of birth: Tours, France
- Height: 1.75 m (5 ft 9 in)
- Position: Right-back

Team information
- Current team: Monaco
- Number: 49

Youth career
- 2011–2021: Étoile Bleue Saint-Cyr-sur-Loire
- 2021–2026: Monaco

Senior career*
Years	Team	Apps	(Gls)
2026–	Monaco	3	(0)

International career^{‡}
2025	France U20	7	(0)
- * Club domestic league appearances and goals as of 19:13, 23 August 2026 (UTC) ‡ National team caps and goals as of 23:28, 16 May 2026 (UTC)

Ilane Touré (born 4 August 2006) is a French professional footballer who plays as a right-back for Ligue 1 club Monaco.

== Club career ==
Touré is a product of the youth academies of the clubs Étoile Bleue Saint-Cyr-sur-Loire and Monaco. On 24 September 2025 he signed his first professional contract with Monaco. On 10 May 2026, he debuted with Monaco as a substitute in a 1–0 Ligue 1 loss to Lille.

== International career ==
Born in France, Touré is of Ivorian descent. He was called up to the France U20s for the 2025 FIFA U-20 World Cup.

== Career statistics ==
As of match played 27 August 2026

Appearances and goals by club, season and competition
Club	Season	League			Cup		Europe		Other		Total	
Club	Season	Division	Apps	Goals	Apps	Goals	Apps	Goals	Apps	Goals	Apps	Goals
Monaco	2025–26	Ligue 1	2	0	—		—		—		2	0
Monaco	2026–27	Ligue 1	1	0	0	0	1 (Note: Appearances in UEFA Conference League)	0	—		2	0
Career total			3	0	0	0	1	0	0	0	4	0
