= Radosław Majecki =

Polish footballer

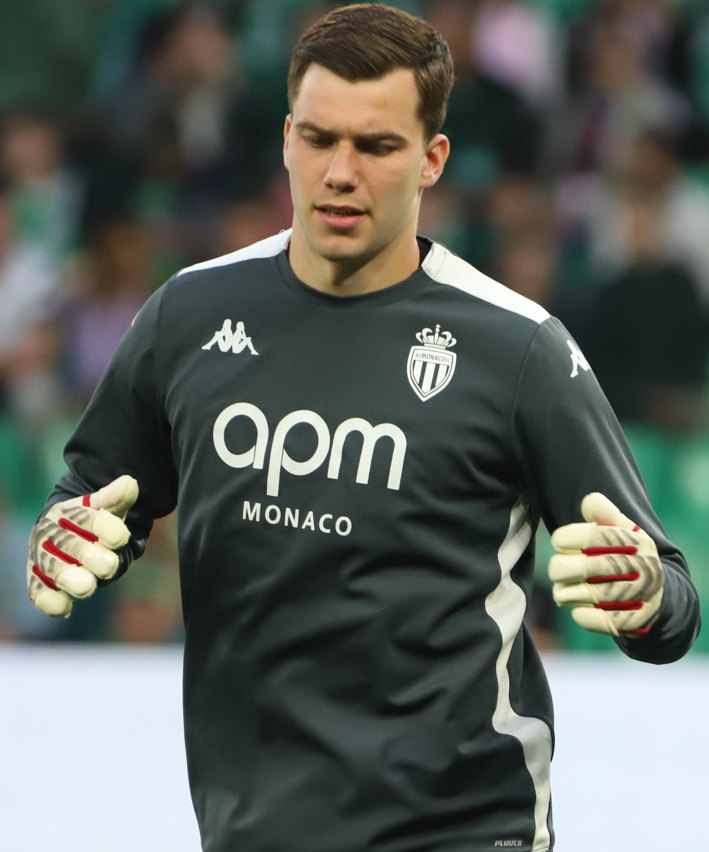
- Majecki with Monaco in 2025

Personal information
- Full name: Radosław Majecki
- Date of birth: 16 November 1999 (age 26)
- Place of birth: Starachowice, Poland
- Height: 1.93 m (6 ft 4 in)
- Position: Goalkeeper

Team information
- Current team: Pafos (on loan from Monaco)
- Number: 99

Youth career
- 2009–2011: Arka Pawłów
- 2011–2014: KSZO Ostrowiec
- 2014–2016: Legia Warsaw

Senior career*
| Years | Team | Apps | (Gls) |
| 2016–2019 | Legia Warsaw II | 30 | (0) |
| 2016–2020 | Legia Warsaw | 34 | (0) |
| 2017–2018 | → Stal Mielec (loan) | 32 | (0) |
| 2020– | Monaco | 28 | (0) |
| 2020 | → Legia Warsaw (loan) | 13 | (0) |
| 2022–2023 | → Cercle Brugge (loan) | 34 | (0) |
| 2025–2026 | → Brest (loan) | 10 | (0) |
| 2026– | → Pafos (loan) | 5 | (0) |

International career
| 2014–2015 | Poland U16 | 3 | (0) |
| 2015–2016 | Poland U17 | 3 | (0) |
| 2016 | Poland U18 | 1 | (0) |
| 2017–2018 | Poland U19 | 9 | (0) |
| 2017–2019 | Poland U20 | 10 | (0) |
| 2020 | Poland U21 | 3 | (0) |
| 2021 | Poland | 1 | (0) |
- * Club domestic league appearances and goals as of 19:00, 11 October 2026 (UTC)

Radosław Majecki (born 16 November 1999) is a Polish professional footballer who plays as a goalkeeper for Cypriot First Division club Pafos, on loan from Ligue 1 club Monaco.

== Club career ==
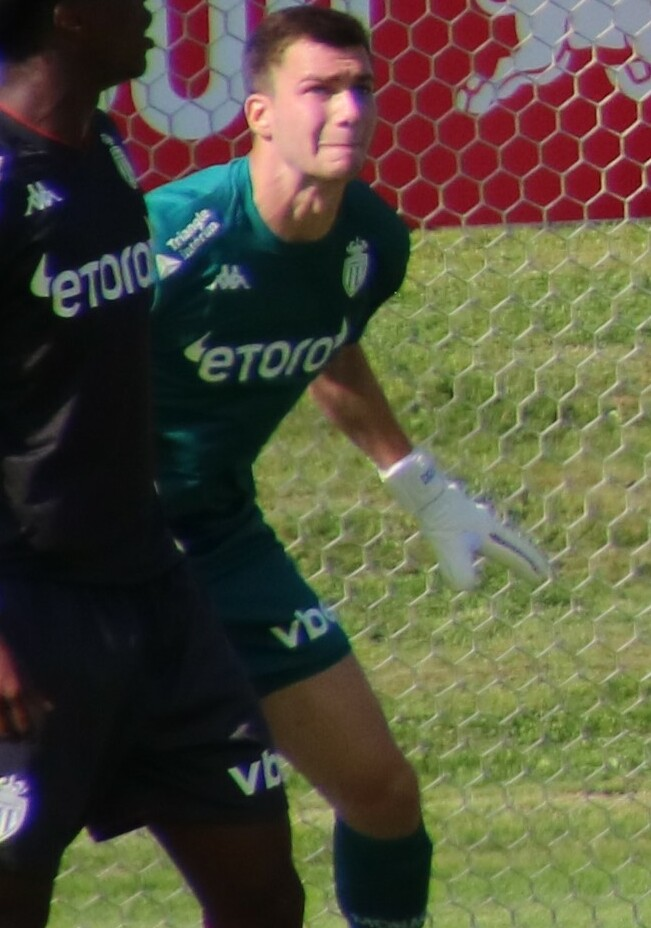
Majecki in 2020 playing for Monaco

In January 2020, Majecki agreed a contract until June 2024 with Ligue 1 side Monaco, who loaned him back to Legia Warsaw until the end of the 2019–20 season. The transfer fee paid to Legia Warsaw was reported as €7 million.

On 20 July 2022, he moved on a loan until the end of the season to Belgian side Cercle Brugge.

On 25 February 2024, Majecki was chosen to play over first-choice goalkeeper Philipp Köhn for a 3–2 away win over Lens, making his first Ligue 1 appearance since September 2020. He would stay in the starting line-up for the remainder of the 2023–24 season, keeping seven clean sheets in 11 league appearances, as Monaco finished runners-up and qualified for the UEFA Champions League. On 20 May 2024, he signed a new four-year deal with the Monégasque club.

One day after Monaco signed Lukas Hradecky, on 9 August 2025, Majecki joined Brest on a season-long loan.

On 17 July 2026, Majecki was loaned to Pafos in Cyprus, with an option to buy.

== International career ==
On 5 October 2021, Majecki received his first call-up to the Polish senior squad to replace Bartłomiej Drągowski for the 2022 FIFA World Cup qualification matches against San Marino and Albania. He debuted against the former opponent on 9 October 2021. Majecki was named in the provisional squad for Poland for the 2022 FIFA World Cup campaign, but not in the final 26-man squad.

== Career statistics ==
=== Club ===
As of matches played 15 October 2026

Appearances and goals by club, season and competition
| Club | Season | League | | | National cup (Note: Includes Polish Cup, Coupe de France) | | Europe | | Other | | Total | |
| Club | Season | Division | Apps | Goals | Apps | Goals | Apps | Goals | Apps | Goals | Apps | Goals |
|---|---|---|---|---|---|---|---|---|---|---|---|---|
| Legia Warsaw II | 2015–16 | III liga | 4 | 0 | — | | — | | 0 | 0 | 4 | 0 |
| Legia Warsaw II | 2016–17 | III liga | 17 | 0 | — | | — | | 0 | 0 | 17 | 0 |
| Legia Warsaw II | 2018–19 | III liga | 9 | 0 | — | | — | | 0 | 0 | 9 | 0 |
| Legia Warsaw II | Total | | 30 | 0 | — | | — | | 0 | 0 | 30 | 0 |
| Legia Warsaw | 2018–19 | Ekstraklasa | 14 | 0 | 3 | 0 | 0 | 0 | — | | 17 | 0 |
| Legia Warsaw | 2019–20 | Ekstraklasa | 20 | 0 | 0 | 0 | 8 (Note: Appearances in UEFA Europa League) | 0 | — | | 28 | 0 |
| Legia Warsaw | Total | | 34 | 0 | 3 | 0 | 8 | 0 | — | | 45 | 0 |
| Stal Mielec (loan) | 2017–18 | I liga | 32 | 0 | 1 | 0 | — | | 0 | 0 | 33 | 0 |
| Monaco | 2020–21 | Ligue 1 | 1 | 0 | 6 | 0 | — | | — | | 7 | 0 |
| Monaco | 2021–22 | Ligue 1 | 0 | 0 | 2 | 0 | 2 (Note: One appearance in UEFA Champions League, one appearance in UEFA Europa League) | 0 | — | | 4 | 0 |
| Monaco | 2023–24 | Ligue 1 | 12 | 0 | 3 | 0 | — | | — | | 15 | 0 |
| Monaco | 2024–25 | Ligue 1 | 15 | 0 | 0 | 0 | 8 (Note: Appearances in UEFA Champions League) | 0 | — | | 23 | 0 |
| Monaco | Total | | 28 | 0 | 11 | 0 | 10 | 0 | — | | 49 | 0 |
| Legia Warsaw (loan) | 2019–20 | Ekstraklasa | 13 | 0 | — | | — | | — | | 13 | 0 |
| Cercle Brugge (loan) | 2022–23 | Belgian Pro League | 34 | 0 | 0 | 0 | — | | — | | 34 | 0 |
| Brest (loan) | 2025–26 | Ligue 1 | 10 | 0 | 0 | 0 | — | | — | | 10 | 0 |
| Pafos (loan) | 2026–27 | Cypriot First Division | 5 | 0 | 0 | 0 | 7 (Note: Four appearances in UEFA Europa League, three appearances in UEFA Conference League) | 0 | 1 (Note: Appearance in Cypriot Super Cup) | 0 | 13 | 0 |
| Career total | | | 186 | 0 | 15 | 0 | 25 | 0 | 1 | 0 | 227 | 0 |

=== International ===
As of match played 12 June 2022

Appearances and goals by national team and year
| National team | Year | Apps | Goals |
|---|---|---|---|
| Poland | 2021 | 1 | 0 |
| Total | | 1 | 0 |

== Honours ==
Legia Warsaw

- Ekstraklasa: 2019–20

Legia Warsaw II

- Polish Cup (Masovia regionals): 2018–19

Monaco

- Coupe de France runner-up: 2020–21

Pafos

- Cypriot Super Cup: 2026

Individual

- Ekstraklasa Young Player of the Month: December 2018
