= Pape Cabral =

French footballer (born 2007)

Personal information
- Date of birth: 20 January 2007 (age 19)
- Place of birth: Keur Massar, Senegal
- Position: Midfielder

Team information
- Current team: Monaco
- Number: 19

Youth career
- 2013–2022: CS Mainvilliers
- 2022–2025: Monaco

Senior career*
Years	Team	Apps	(Gls)
2025–	Monaco	5	(0)

International career^{‡}
2022–2023	France U16	8	(1)
2023–2024	France U17	11	(1)
2024–2025	France U18	9	(2)
2024–	France U19	6	(2)
- * Club domestic league appearances and goals as of 23:06, 18 September 2026 (UTC) ‡ National team caps and goals as of 21:15, 11 November 2025 (UTC)

Pape Cabral (born 20 January 2007) is a professional footballer who plays as a midfielder for the Ligue 1 club Monaco. Born in Senegal, he is a youth international for France.

== Career ==
A youth product of the French club CS Mainvilliers, he joined Monaco's youth academy on a free in 2022 where he finished his development. On 11 February 2025, he signed his first professional contract with Monaco until 2028. He made his senior and professional debut with Monaco as a substitute in a 1–0 Ligue 1 loss to Lorient on 27 September 2025.

== International career ==
Born in Senegal and of Senegalese and Bissau-Guinean descent, Cabral moved to France at a young age and holds dual Senegalese and French citizenship. He was called up to the France U17s for the 2024 UEFA European Under-17 Championship.

== Career statistics ==
As of match played 18 September 2026

Appearances and goals by club, season and competition
Club	Season	League			Cup		Europe		Other		Total	
Club	Season	Division	Apps	Goals	Apps	Goals	Apps	Goals	Apps	Goals	Apps	Goals
AS Monaco	2025–26	Ligue 1	4	0	0	0	2 (Note: Appearances in UEFA Champions League)	0	—		6	0
AS Monaco	2026–27	Ligue 1	1	0	0	0	0	0	—		1	0
Career total			5	0	0	0	2	0	0	0	7	0
