= Edan Diop =

French footballer (born 2004)

Personal information
- Date of birth: 28 August 2004 (age 22)
- Place of birth: Tours, France
- Height: 1.73 m (5 ft 8 in)
- Position: Midfielder

Team information
- Current team: Monaco
- Number: 37

Youth career
- 2009–2014: Tours
- 2014–2027: Chambray FC
- 2019–2023: Monaco

Senior career*
Years	Team	Apps	(Gls)
2023–	Monaco	20	(2)
2025–2026	→ Cercle Brugge (loan)	33	(7)

International career^{‡}
2022–2023	France U19	9	(4)
2023–2024	France U20	4	(0)
- * Club domestic league appearances and goals as of 18 October 2026 ‡ National team caps and goals as of 25 March 2024

Edan Diop (born 28 August 2004) is a French professional footballer who plays as a midfielder for Ligue 1 club Monaco.

== Club career ==
Diop is a youth product of Tours and Chambray FC, before joining the youth academy of Monaco in 2019. He signed his first professional contract with Monaco on 5 August 2022 until 2025. He made his professional debut with Monaco as a substitute in a UEFA Europa League match against Bayer Leverkusen in a 3–2 (5–3) penalty shootout loss on 23 February 2023.

On 18 July 2025, Diop joined Cercle Brugge in Belgium on loan.

== International career ==
Diop is a youth international for France, having played for the France U19s in 2022.

== Personal life ==
Diop was born in France to a Senegalese father and a Moroccan mother. His older brother Sofiane Diop is also a professional footballer.

== Playing style ==
Diop is a box-to-box midfielder. He is a goalscorer, having scored several for the Monaco youth side's and as a youth international.

== Career statistics ==
As of match played 18 October 2026

Appearances and goals by club, season and competition
Club	Season	League			National cup		Continental		Other		Total	
Club	Season	Division	Apps	Goals	Apps	Goals	Apps	Goals	Apps	Goals	Apps	Goals
Monaco	2022–23	Ligue 1	7	1	0	0	1 (Note: Appearances in UEFA Europa League)	0	—		8	1
Monaco	2023–24	Ligue 1	10	0	2	0	—		—		12	0
Monaco	2026–27	Ligue 1	3	1	0	0	1 (Note: Appearance in UEFA Conference League)	0	—		4	1
Monaco	Total		20	2	2	0	2	0	—		24	2
Cercle Brugge (loan)	2025–26	Belgian Pro League	33	7	2	0	—		—		35	7
Career total			53	9	4	0	2	0	0	0	59	9

== Honours ==
Monaco U19

- Championnat National U19 runner-up: 2021–22
