= Jerko Mikulić =

Croatian footballer

Personal information
- Date of birth: 26 June 1976 (age 50)
- Place of birth: Zadar, SR Croatia, SFR Yugoslavia
- Height: 1.81 m (5 ft 11 in)
- Position: Defender

Team information
- Current team: Monaco (physiotherapist)

Youth career
- –1997: Zadar

Senior career*
Years	Team	Apps	(Gls)
1997–2002	Zadar	74	(2)
1999–2000	→ Dinara (loan)		
2002–2005	Karpaty Lviv	31	(1)
2005–2007	Zadar	10	(1)
Total		115	(4)

Managerial career
- 2007–2012: Zadar (physiotherapist)
- 2013–: Monaco (physiotherapist)
- * Club domestic league appearances and goals

Jerko Mikulić (born 26 August 1977) is a former Croatian footballer who played as a defender, currently physiotherapist at Ligue 1 club Monaco.

== Career ==
Mikulic started his senior career with NK Zadar. After that, he played for HNK Dinara. In 2002, he signed for Karpaty Lviv in the Ukrainian Premier League, where he made 41 league appearances and scored one goal.
