= Anis Soubeir =

French footballer (born 2007)

Personal information
- Date of birth: 30 May 2007 (age 19)
- Place of birth: Verdun, France
- Position: Midfielder

Team information
- Current team: Monaco
- Number: 46

Youth career
- FC Metz
- 2014–2026: Monaco

Senior career*
Years	Team	Apps	(Gls)
2026–	Monaco	4	(0)

International career^{‡}
- Morocco U20
- * Club domestic league appearances and goals as of 15 October 2026 ‡ National team caps and goals as of 15 October 2026

Anis Soubeir (born 30 May 2007) is a French professional footballer who plays as a midfielder for Monaco.

== Club career ==
Born in Verdun, Soubeir is a youth product of FC Verdun-Belleville and FC Metz.

In June 2025, he moved to Monaco, where he signed his first professional contract.

After a season where he stood out with the under-19, he was added to Filipe Luís' first team on the summer 2026, impressing during the pre-season friendlies.

Soubeir made his professional debut with Monaco in a 3–2 away UEFA Conference League playoff win over Górnik Zabrze on 20 August 2026, coming on for Mathys Detourbet on the 55th minute.

He made his Ligue 1 debut three days later in a 1–0 away win over Le Havre, already showing his attacking flair after replacing Mamadou Coulibaly during the last half hour.

He followed playing every game with the principality as they emerged as Ligue 1 leaders during the first weeks of the competition, earning his first start with the club on 12 September 2026 in an away league game with Strasbourg, however suffering an ankle sprain that forced him off on the 22nd minute.

== International career ==
Born in France, Soubeir also has Algerian and Moroccan origins, and was called to the Morocco under-20 team in March 2026.
