= Carlos Aviña =

Mexican football manager (born 1990)

Personal information
- Full name: Carlos Aviña Ibarrola
- Date of birth: 13 October 1990 (age 36)
- Place of birth: Mexico

Managerial career
- Years: Team
- 2015–2020: Club América (director)
- 2020–2023: Cercle Brugge KSV (sporting director)
- 2023–: AS Monaco (sporting director)

Carlos Aviña Ibarrola (born 13 October 1990) is a Mexican football manager who is the sporting director of AS Monaco.

== Career ==
In 2015, Aviña was appointed as a director of Mexican side Club América, where he helped the club sign Uruguay international Federico Viñas, Paraguay international Richard Sánchez, and Colombia international Nicolás Benedetti.

Five years later, he was appointed as sporting director of Belgian side Cercle Brugge KSV. Mexican news website Mediotiempo wrote in 2024 that he "made the team one of the most valuable franchises in Belgian football, increasing its value by €20 million... [and] steered the team away from relegation concerns while managing the club. Subsequently, he was appointed sporting director of Ligue 1 side AS Monaco in 2023.

== Personal life ==
Aviña was born on 13 October 1990 in Mexico. During his career, he became friends with English football manager Paul Mitchell, who also mentored him.
