= Jyri Nieminen =

Finnish footballer and goalkeeping coach (born 1987)

Personal information
- Date of birth: 2 December 1987 (age 38)
- Place of birth: Tampere, Finland
- Height: 1.76 m (5 ft 9 in)
- Position: Goalkeeper

Team information
- Current team: AS Monaco (goalkeeping coach); Finland (goalkeeping coach)

Senior career*
Years	Team	Apps	(Gls)
2008	SJK	–	(–)
2009–2011	FC Jazz	–	(–)
2012	BK-46	–	(–)
2013	Åbo IFK	–	(–)

Managerial career
- 2012–2013: TPS (assistant)
- 2012–2013: TPS (gk coach)
- 2014: Estonia U17–U23 (gk coach)
- 2015–2018: Aspire Academy (gk coach)
- 2015–2018: Qatar U17 (gk coach)
- 2018–2019: San Jose Earthquakes (gk coach)
- 2019–2020: Orlando Pirates (gk coach)
- 2021–2023: New York Red Bulls (gk coach)
- 2023–2026: Feyenoord (gk coach)
- 2025–: Finland (gk coach)
- 2026–: AS Monaco (gk coach)
- * Club domestic league appearances and goals

Jyri Nieminen (born 2 December 1987) is a Finnish football coach and a former player who played as a goalkeeper. He works as the goalkeeping coach of Ligue 1 club AS Monaco and for the Finland national team.

Nieminen received his UEFA A Goalkeeping license in 2016.

== Playing career ==
Nieminen played as a goalkeeper for SJK, FC Jazz, BK-46 and ÅIFK in Finnish third-tier Kakkonen, before he announced his retirement in 2013. Due to his height, he never became a professional player.

== Coaching career ==
Nieminen first started coaching at the age of 14, as a goalkeeping coach of U13 youth team of a local club PP-70 in Tampere.

Nieminen also worked as a goalkeeping coach for Honka youth sectors, recommended by his friend, a fellow coach Jarkko Tuomisto. In 2012, while coaching in Honka, he also occasionally helped with the first team in Veikkausliiga and the reserve team Pallohonka. Simultaneously, he played for Karjaa-based BK-46 in third-tier Kakkonen and coached the club's youth teams. Later in 2012, he started working for Veikkausliiga club Turun Palloseura (TPS) as a goalkeeping coach and assistant coach, and played for another Turku-based club Åbo IFK in Kakkonen.

=== Estonia ===
In 2013, while coaching TPS in Kupittaa, Turku, he was noticed by Estonian goalkeeping coach Mart Poom. A month later, he was invited to a job interview, and in 2014 he started to coach the goalkeepers of the Estonian youth national teams, as a goalkeeping coordinator of Estonian FA.

=== Qatar: Aspire Academy and youth national team ===
In February 2015, Nieminen was appointed the goalkeeping coach of Qatari Aspire Academy, where he specialized in elite player development and game analysis, and the Qatar under-17 national team. He also reunited with Jarkko Tuomisto in Aspire.

=== San Jose Earthquakes ===
After approximately two-and-a-half years in Qatar, Nieminen was appointed the goalkeeping coach of Major League Soccer (MLS) side San Jose Earthquakes on 25 January 2018. He was named in the coaching staff of Mikael Stahre. After Stahre was replaced by Matías Almeyda in September, Nieminen's role was reduced in the team.

=== Orlando Pirates ===
In July 2019, Nieminen signed with South African Premiership giants Orlando Pirates. After approximately a year-and-a-half with the club, Nieminen announced his departure in late December 2020, partly due to COVID-19 pandemic.

=== New York Red Bulls ===
Nieminen returned to United States and MLS, when he was appointed the goalkeeping coach of New York Red Bulls in early 2021.

On 6 July 2023, the club announced that they had reached an agreement with Feyenoord on the fee for his contract, and he will depart the club. In all three seasons Nieminen was in New York, the club ranked in top five in MLS with the least goals allowed in the league.

=== Feyenoord ===
In July 2023, Nieminen was appointed the goalkeeping coach of Dutch champions Feyenoord on a three-year deal. He joined the coaching team of Arne Slot. At the end of the season in 2024, the club won the national KNVB Cup and the Johan Cryuff Shield.

=== Finland national team ===
On 24 April 2025, Nieminen was appointed the goalkeeping coach of the Finland national team, while also continuing his work with Feyenoord.

== Personal life ==
Nieminen is married and a father of a daughter.
