= Armand Forchério =

Monégasque footballer and manager (born 1941)

Personal information
- Full name: Armand Forchério
- Date of birth: 1 March 1941 (age 85)
- Place of birth: Monte Carlo, Monaco
- Height: 1.78 m (5 ft 10 in)
- Position: Defender

Senior career*
Years	Team	Apps	(Gls)
1961–1972	Monaco	248	(2)

Managerial career
- 1972–1974: Arles-Avignon
- 1976–1977: Monaco
- * Club domestic league appearances and goals

Armand Forchério (born 1 March 1941) is a Monégasque former footballer who played as a defender for AS Monaco from 1961 to 1972. He then managed the club from 1976 to 1977, becoming the only Monégasque manager in the club's history. He also managed the French club AC Arles-Avignon.
