= Jarkko Tuomisto =

Finnish goalkeeping coach (born 1975)

Personal information
- Full name: Jarkko Antero Tuomisto
- Date of birth: 30 August 1975 (age 51)
- Place of birth: Vantaa, Finland
- Position: Goalkeeper

Team information
- Current team: Başakşehir (gk coach)

Senior career*
Years	Team	Apps	(Gls)
	Inter Turku	1	(0)

Managerial career
- 2007–2010: HIFK (gk coach)
- 2010–2013: Honka (gk coach)
- 2013–2014: Arzaghena (gk coach)
- 2015–2018: Aspire Academy (gk coach)
- 2015–2018: Qatar U19 (gk coach)
- 2018–2020: Independiente del Valle (gk coach)
- 2020: Viitorul Constanța (gk coach)
- 2021: Fatih Karagümrük (gk coach)
- 2021–2023: Alanyaspor (gk coach)
- 2023–2024: Nice (gk coach)
- 2024–2025: Ajax (gk coach)
- 2025–: Başakşehir (gk coach)
- * Club domestic league appearances and goals

Jarkko Tuomisto (born 30 August 1975) is a Finnish football coach, currently working as a goalkeeping coach of Süper Lig club Başakşehir.

Tuomisto received his UEFA A Goalkeeping coaching license in 2017.

== Early career ==
Tuomisto lived in Turku in the 1990s and played as a goalkeeper at an amateur level with local clubs in lower divisions. He went on to make one appearance with Inter Turku in the second-tier Ykkönen, before focusing on coaching. Before starting coaching in senior teams, Tuomisto worked as a goalkeeping coach for the youth teams of Turun Toverit (TuTo). Later, he moved to Lohja to study youth leading in Kanneljärven Opisto folk high school. He also worked in Tanoke-coaching company of Pertti Kemppinen in the Helsinki metropolitan area. He was the goalkeeping coach of HIFK first team during 2007–2010 in the third-tier Kakkonen. In 2010, he joined the coaching staff of Mika Lehkosuo in Veikkausliiga club Honka. The team won the Finnish Cup in 2012.

== Coaching career ==
Since 2007, Tuomisto had traveled to Italy every year at his own expense to get familiar with different clubs and organisations at various levels, including Piacenza.

=== Arzachena ===
In 2014, Tuomisto was named a goalkeeping coach for Arzaghena in Italian Serie D and worked for the club for five months.

=== Qatar and Aspire Academy ===
From 2015 to 2018, Tuomisto worked for Aspire Academy in Qatar along with fellow Finnish coach Jyri Nieminen, and for the Qatar under-19 national team. In Aspire, Tuomisto worked also with Francesco Farioli for the first time.

=== Independiente del Valle ===
Between January 2018 and June 2020, he was the goalkeeping coach for Independiente del Valle in the Ecuadorian Serie A. He also worked at developing the goalkeeping coaching of the club's youth academy.

=== Viitorul Constanta ===
After leaving Ecuador, he was appointed the goalkeeping coach of Viitorul Constanța in Romanian Liga I in 2020.

=== Francesco Farioli coaching staff ===
Since the early 2021, Tuomisto has been working in the coaching team of manager Francesco Farioli, starting in Turkish Süper Lig clubs Fatih Karagümrük and Alanyaspor, before being named the goalkeeping coach of French Ligue 1 side Nice in July 2023. During the 2023–24 season, Nice conceded the season's lowest number of goals in Ligue 1, 29, which was also among the least amount conceded by any team in all of the top European leagues.

One year later in July 2024, Tuomisto followed Farioli to Eredivisie club Ajax.

== Personal life ==
Tuomisto speaks Finnish, English, Italian and Spanish.
