= Sion Oppong =

Swedish footballer (born 2006)

Personal information
- Full name: Sion Uno Kobi Oppong
- Date of birth: 25 September 2007 (age 19)
- Place of birth: Stockholm, Sweden
- Height: 1.80 m (5 ft 11 in)
- Position: Left winger

Team information
- Current team: Toulouse
- Number: 11

Youth career
- 2011–2024: IF Brommapojkarna

Senior career*
Years	Team	Apps	(Gls)
2025–2026	IF Brommapojkarna	16	(2)
2025	→ Viggbyholms IK (loan)	1	(0)
2025	→ FC Stockholm (loan)	8	(3)
2026–	Toulouse	4	(1)

International career^{‡}
2025–2026	Sweden U19	14	(1)
2026–	Sweden U21	3	(0)
- * Club domestic league appearances and goals as of 3 September 2026 ‡ National team caps and goals as of 17:18, 6 October 2026 (UTC)

Sion Uno Kobi Oppong (born 25 September 2007) is a Swedish professional footballer who plays as a left winger for Ligue 1 club Toulouse.

== Club career ==
=== Brommapojkarna ===
Oppong was promoted to IF Brommapojkarna's senior team in January 2025, alongside teammate Oskar Cotton. He made his competitive debut on 23 February 2025, coming on as a substitute for Love Arrhov in a 3–0 Svenska Cupen win vs Örgryte IS. He made his Allsvenskan debut on 5 October 2025 in a 1–3 loss to BK Häcken, once again substituting Arrhov. During the season he also made appearances on loan at Viggbyholms IK and FC Stockholm. Oppong scored his first Allsvenskan goal on 4 May 2026, away from home against Halmstads BK. A few weeks later he scored his second, the lone goal in a 1–0 win vs. Kalmar FF.

=== Toulouse ===
On 7 August 2026, Oppong signed a four-season contract with Toulouse in France.

== International career ==
Oppong is a youth international for Sweden.
