= Philipp Köhn =

Association football player (born 1998)

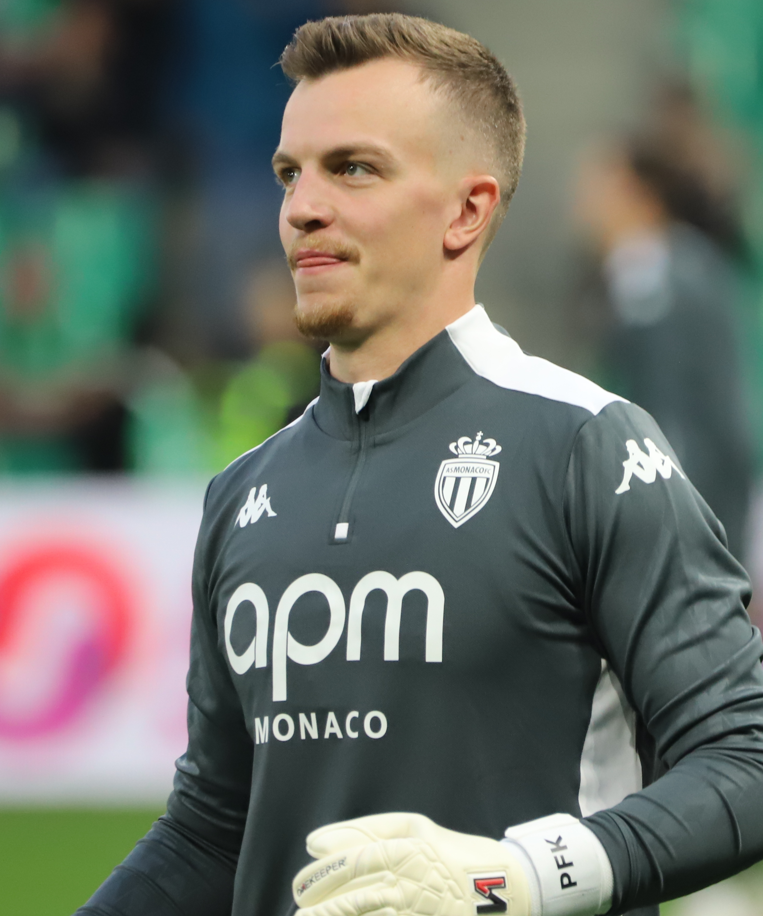
- Köhn with Monaco in 2025

Personal information
- Full name: Philipp François Köhn
- Date of birth: 2 April 1998 (age 28)
- Place of birth: Dinslaken, Germany
- Height: 1.90 m (6 ft 3 in)
- Position: Goalkeeper

Team information
- Current team: Monaco
- Number: 16

Youth career
- 2004–2005: SuS 09 Dinslaken
- 2005–2007: MSV Duisburg
- 2007–2013: Schalke 04
- 2013–2017: VfB Stuttgart

Senior career*
| Years | Team | Apps | (Gls) |
| 2017–2018 | RB Leipzig | 0 | (0) |
| 2018–2019 | FC Liefering | 12 | (0) |
| 2019–2023 | Red Bull Salzburg | 60 | (0) |
| 2020–2021 | → FC Wil (loan) | 32 | (0) |
| 2023– | Monaco | 59 | (0) |

International career
| 2012–2013 | Germany U15 | 4 | (0) |
| 2013–2014 | Germany U16 | 4 | (0) |
| 2014 | Germany U17 | 2 | (0) |
| 2015 | Germany U18 | 1 | (0) |
| 2016–2017 | Switzerland U19 | 5 | (0) |
| 2017–2019 | Switzerland U20 | 5 | (0) |
| 2019–2021 | Switzerland U21 | 4 | (0) |
- * Club domestic league appearances and goals as of 28 February 2026

Philipp François Köhn (born 2 April 1998) is a professional footballer who plays as a goalkeeper for Ligue 1 club Monaco. Born in Germany, he represented both his country of birth and Switzerland at youth level.

== Personal life ==
He was born in Dinslaken, North Rhine-Westphalia, Germany to a German father and a Swiss mother from Lausanne.

== Club career ==
=== RB Leipzig ===
On 23 February 2017, RB Leipzig's sporting director Ralf Rangnick announced that Köhn would sign with the club as soon as his contract with VfB Stuttgart expires in the summer. On 4 June 2017, Köhn signed a four-year deal keeping him at the German club until June 2021. He didn't make any appearances for the club.

=== Red Bull Salzburg ===
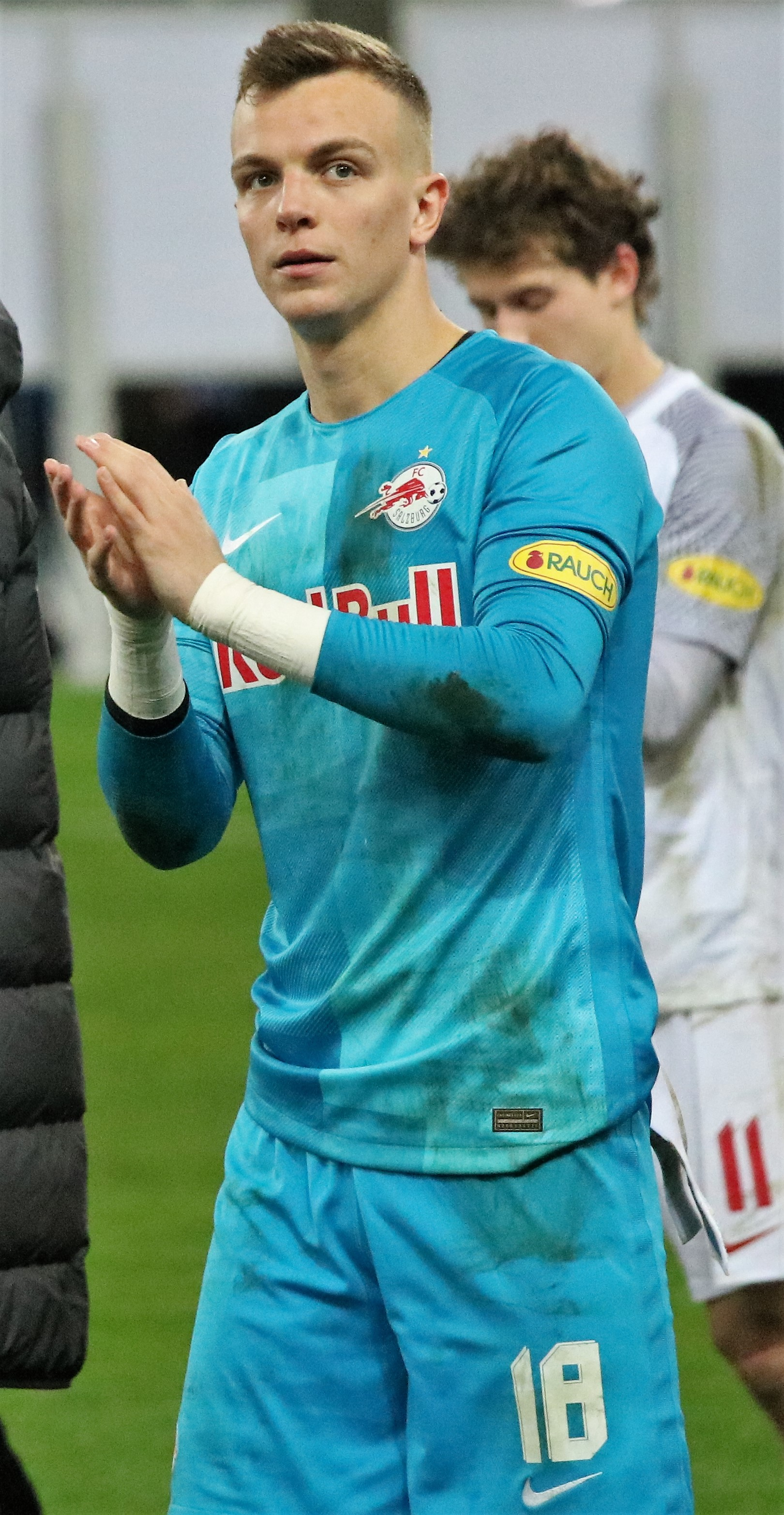
Köhn with Red Bull Salzburg in 2022

On 6 July 2018, Red Bull Salzburg announced that they had signed Köhn from RB Leipzig, their unofficial sister club, on a four-year contract. Since FC Liefering is Salzburg's feeder team, he was eligible to play for both clubs as a cooperation player. During the 2019–20 pre-season friendly, Köhn played in a football match between Salzburg and Chelsea in the Red Bull Arena, replacing Cican Stankovic at half-time. He conceded two goals from Pedro and Michy Batshuayi as the match ended in a 5–3 loss. He featured for Liefering twelve times.

==== Loan to Wil and return to Salzburg ====
On 29 July 2020, he went to Swiss side Wil on loan. After 33 matches in all competitions, he returned to Salzburg.

In the 2021–22 season, he became the starting goalkeeper at Salzburg ahead of Nico Mantl, in which he played in the Champions League, as his club managed to reach the round of 16. He also achieved the domestic double under coach Matthias Jaissle. In the 2022–23 season, he won his second domestic league title in a row and third in total, and was voted as "Best Goalkeeper of the Season".

=== Monaco ===
On 15 July 2023, Köhn joined Ligue 1 club Monaco by signing a 5-year contract. Later that year, on 11 November, he saved his first penalty at the club in the 100th minute of stoppage time to maintain an away goalless draw against Le Havre.

== International career ==
=== Germany ===
Köhn has represented Germany from under-15 to under-18 age groups, before switching his allegiance to Switzerland. He has been playing for Switzerland from under-19.

=== Switzerland ===
Köhn also featured for Switzerland under-20 and under-21 teams. In November 2022, he was named in the senior team's 2022 FIFA World Cup roster.

== Career statistics ==
As of match played 6 March 2026

Appearances and goals by club, season and competition
| Club | Season | League | | | National cup (Note: Includes Austrian Cup, Coupe de France) | | Continental | | Other | | Total | |
| Club | Season | Division | Apps | Goals | Apps | Goals | Apps | Goals | Apps | Goals | Apps | Goals |
|---|---|---|---|---|---|---|---|---|---|---|---|---|
| Liefering | 2018–19 | 2. Liga | 12 | 0 | — | | — | | — | | 12 | 0 |
| Red Bull Salzburg | 2019–20 | Austrian Bundesliga | 0 | 0 | 0 | 0 | 0 | 0 | — | | 0 | 0 |
| Red Bull Salzburg | 2021–22 | Austrian Bundesliga | 28 | 0 | 3 | 0 | 10 (Note: Appearance(s) in UEFA Champions League) | 0 | — | | 41 | 0 |
| Red Bull Salzburg | 2022–23 | Austrian Bundesliga | 32 | 0 | 2 | 0 | 8 (Note: Six appearances in UEFA Champions League, two appearances in UEFA Europa League) | 0 | — | | 42 | 0 |
| Red Bull Salzburg | Total | | 60 | 0 | 5 | 0 | 18 | 0 | — | | 83 | 0 |
| FC Wil (loan) | 2020–21 | Swiss Challenge League | 32 | 0 | 1 | 0 | — | | — | | 33 | 0 |
| Monaco | 2023–24 | Ligue 1 | 22 | 0 | 0 | 0 | — | | 0 | 0 | 22 | 0 |
| Monaco | 2024–25 | Ligue 1 | 19 | 0 | 1 | 0 | 2 | 0 | 1 (Note: Appearances in Trophée des Champions) | 0 | 23 | 0 |
| Monaco | 2025–26 | Ligue 1 | 19 | 0 | 2 | 0 | 8 | 0 | — | | 29 | 0 |
| Monaco | Total | | 60 | 0 | 3 | 0 | 10 | 0 | 1 | 0 | 74 | 0 |
| Career total | | | 164 | 0 | 9 | 0 | 28 | 0 | 1 | 0 | 202 | 0 |

== Honours ==
Red Bull Salzburg

- Austrian Bundesliga: 2019–20, 2021–22, 2022–23
- Austrian Cup: 2019–20, 2021–22

Individual

- Best goalkeeper in the Austrian Bundesliga: 2022–23
