= AS Monaco FC =

Association football club in Monaco

AS Monaco
- Full name: Association Sportive de Monaco Football Club
- Nicknames: Les Rouge et Blanc (The Red and Whites); Les Monégasques (The Monégasques); Le Rocher (The Rock)
- Short name: AS Monaco, ASM
- Founded: 23 August 1924; 102 years ago
- Stadium: Stade Louis II
- Capacity: 16,360
- Owners: Monaco Sport Investment Ltd (66.67%); House of Grimaldi (33.33%)
- President: Dmitry Rybolovlev
- Head coach: Filipe Luís
- League: Ligue 1
- 2025–26: Ligue 1, 7th of 18
- Website: asmonaco.com
Home colours	Away colours	Third colours

Association Sportive de Monaco Football Club, commonly referred to as AS Monaco (French pronunciation: [ɑ.ɛs mɔnako]), is a professional football club based in Fontvieille, Monaco. Although not in France, due to the small size of Monaco, they are a member of the French Football Federation (FFF) and currently compete in Ligue 1, the top tier of French football. Founded in 1918, the team play their home matches at the Stade Louis II. Their training center is situated in France, in La Turbie.

Despite not being a French club, Monaco are one of the most successful clubs in French football, having won eight league titles, five Coupe de France trophies and one Coupe de la Ligue. The club has also played in European football a number of times, and were runners-up in the UEFA Cup Winners' Cup in 1992 and the UEFA Champions League in 2004.

The club's traditional colours are red and white, and the club is known as Les Rouge et Blanc (lit. 'The Red and Whites'). Monaco is a member of the European Club Association. Since December 2011, the club has been majority-owned by the Russian oligarch and billionaire Dmitry Rybolovlev.

== International status ==
Unlike several other European microstates, Monaco has never organized a domestic league and has never sought separate membership in either UEFA or FIFA. Therefore, Monaco became a full member of the French league system, enabling it to represent France in European club competitions. There are several other expatriated football clubs in operation around Europe (such as FC Vaduz of Liechtenstein), but Monaco is unique in that it represents a nation that is not a member of any international organizations.

In 2013, the French Football Professional League (LFP) amended its rules to include the obligation for a club competing in French professional leagues to have its registered office in France. In 2015, the French Council of State ruled in favour of Monaco, allowing the club to keep its registered office in the principality. As a result, football players in Monaco continue to enjoy lower social security contributions (35-40% of an employee’s gross salary compared to the 55-60% of French clubs) and non-French players do not pay income tax in Monaco. This endows AS Monaco with an advantage in terms of signing world-class players.

== History ==
=== Early history ===
AS Monaco FC was founded on 1 August 1920 through the unification of numerous local clubs based in France and the principality. On 23 August 1924, the multiple sports club of the Association Sportive de Monaco was founded. Monaco was then absorbed by the latter and became the football section of the enlarged Monegasque sporting club. Monaco played its matches on a football pitch located in the Fontvieille ward, on the site of the former Stade Louis II. Sometimes also played its home games in Roquebrune-Cap-Martin, France (which borders on Monaco) or on its opponent's pitch.

The club's early years were spent in the amateur regional divisions of the Provence-Alpes-Côte d'Azur region, rising rapidly between the leagues in the 1920s. In 1929, they moved to newly built Stade des Moneghetti, located in the French commune of Beausoleil and next to the border of the Les Moneghetti ward. It became the team's first stadium and remained there until 1939.

In 1933, Monaco were invited by the French Football Federation to turn professional. The Monégasques' first year of second-division football ended in failure, however, as they were relegated to the amateur leagues the following year. In 1939, the club moved to the Stade Louis II.

By 1948, Monaco re-acquired its professional status and returned to the French second division; they subsequently consistently finished in its upper echelons, with this sustained effort resulting in promotion to the French first division for the first time in 1953.

=== 1960–1986: Domestic successes ===
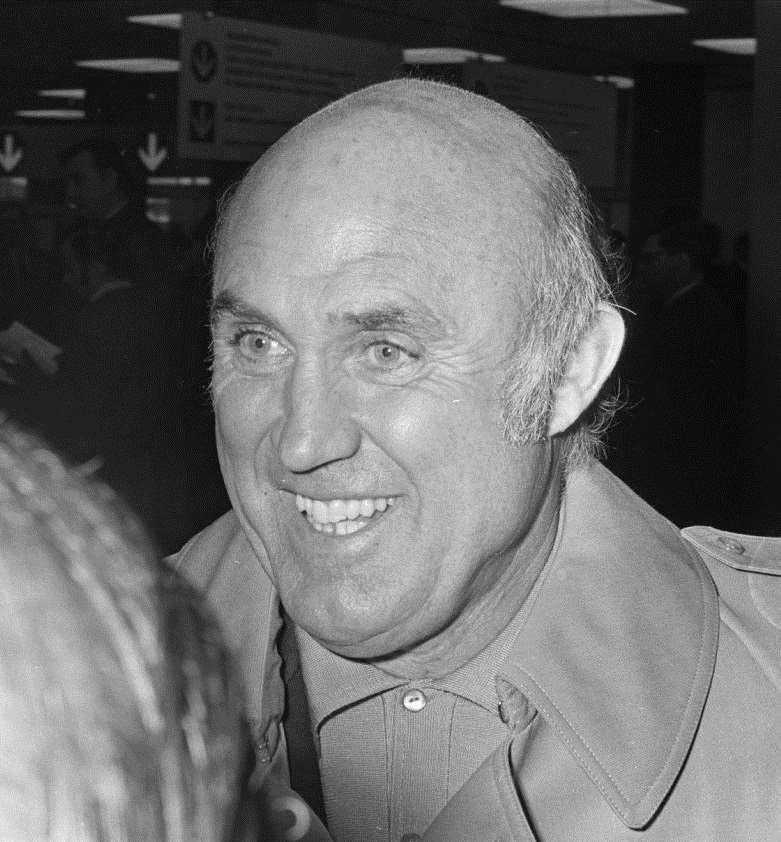
Lucien Leduc guided Monaco to three league titles and two domestic cups

In 1960, Monaco coach Lucien Leduc led the club to its first professional trophy, the Coupe de France, beating Saint-Étienne 4–2 in extra time. This initial success was bettered in the following year with the club winning the French Championship for the first time in its history, qualifying for the European Cup. Leduc subsequently led the club to its first League and Cup Double in 1963. Upon Leduc's departure in 1963, Monaco endured a barren run, entrenched in the middle half of the league for the best part of the next decade and alternating between the first and second divisions after 1963. In 1975, Jean-Louis Campora, son of former president Charles Campora, became chairman of the club. In his second season, he brought back Leduc, who immediately won the club promotion to the first division and won them the championship the following year in 1978. Leduc subsequently left the club again in 1979, to be succeeded by Lucien Muller and Gérard Banide, both of whom were unable to halt the club's decline.

The early 1980s saw a steady stream of successes in national competitions. Monaco won a title almost every other year; the Coupe de France in 1980 and 1985, the French Championship in 1982, was Coupe de France finalist in 1984. In the 1985–86 season, Monaco hammered Bordeaux 9–0, one of the biggest wins in club history.

Disappointingly for Monaco fans, the club could not translate its domestic leadership into European success. Up to this point, Monaco had never passed the first round of any European competition. Monaco lost to Dundee United (1981), CSKA Sofia twice (1982 and 1984) and Universitatea Craiova (1985).

=== 1990s: Wenger and Tigana ===
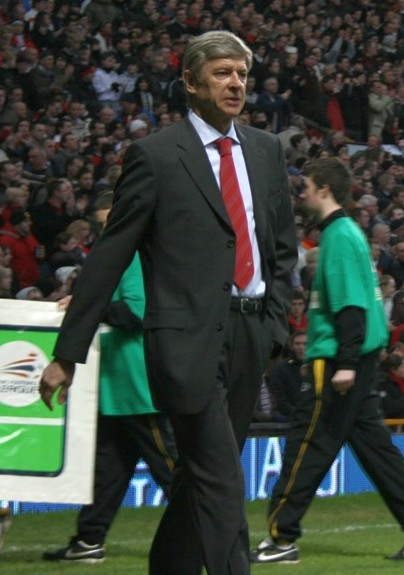
Arsène Wenger led Monaco to the 1987–88 league title.

In 1986, former Ajax manager Ștefan Kovács, who succeeded Rinus Michels and honed his Total Football ideals with the Dutch champions, came out of a three-year "retirement" to manage Monaco, but even he could not bring them success. With the club facing a second barren spell, they signed Arsène Wenger, who had hitherto been relatively unknown, managing Nancy without much success. Wenger's reign saw the club enjoy one of its most successful periods, with several inspired signings, including George Weah, Glenn Hoddle, Jürgen Klinsmann, and Youri Djorkaeff. Youth team policies produced future World Cup winners Emmanuel Petit, Lilian Thuram and Thierry Henry. Under Wenger, they won the league in his first season in charge (1988) and the Coupe de France in 1991, with the club consistently competing in the latter stages of the European Cup and regularly challenging for the league title. The club could have had even greater success in this period, as it emerged in 1993 that bitter rivals Marseille had indulged in match-fixing and numerous improprieties, a view that Wenger had long held. In 1994, after being blocked by the Monaco board from opening discussions with German powerhouse Bayern Munich for their vacant managerial post after being shortlisted for the role, Wenger was released from the club, several weeks after the post had already been filled.

After Wenger's departure, the club went on to record two further league championships; under Jean Tigana in 1997 and under Claude Puel in 2000. However, as the decade came to an end, rumours were surfacing that the club was facing numerous financial difficulties. In 2003, these financial problems came to a head. Despite finishing second in the league, the club was relegated to Ligue 2 by the French Professional League for amassing a €50 million ($68 million) debt. Whilst this was reduced on appeal to a ban on purchasing players, it was enough to force President Jean-Louis Campora, who had been in charge for 28 years, to step aside. He was replaced by Pierre Svara, an administrator considered to be close to the principality's princely family but with no footballing experience.

The following season saw remarkable success on the field, given the club's financial strife. The team, coached by former France/ national team captain Didier Deschamps and featuring stalwarts such as Fernando Morientes, Ludovic Giuly, Jérôme Rothen and Dado Pršo, finished third in Ligue 1 and enjoyed a remarkable run to the final of the UEFA Champions League, beating Real Madrid and Chelsea along the way. However, despite the on-field success, the 2003–04 season was the club's worst financial year in its history. Within 12 months, Deschamps had left as coach and Svara had been replaced by Michel Pastor.

=== Relegation and takeover ===
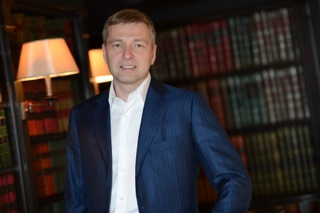
Russian oligarch and billionaire Dmitry Rybolovlev bought the club in 2011 and has made it one of the biggest spenders in the football world.

With Francesco Guidolin hired to replace Deschamps, one of Pastor's first tasks was to hold on to the players who had turned the club into one of the best in Europe. However, he failed to convince them to stay and their replacements were unable to replicate previous successes. Guidolin lasted only one year, before being replaced by assistant coach Laurent Banide who, in turn, only lasted a year, before being replaced by Brazilian Ricardo Gomes. In 2008, after four years at the club featuring six coaches and only mid-table finishes, Pastor left the club amid severe criticism of his management skills.

In 2008, Jérôme de Bontin, a leading shareholder of the club since 2003, took charge of the club, promising a complete shake-up. Under his reign as president, the club brought in players such as Park Chu-young and Freddy Adu, but they did not find much success on the pitch, going through a torrid season and only managing a mid-table finish. De Bontin resigned at the end of the season, replaced by banker Étienne Franzi and a new board of directors.

In July 2009 Ricardo Gomes was replaced by former Cannes and Rennes coach Guy Lacombe, inheriting a youthful squad featuring numerous highly lauded youth team prospects, including Cédric Mongongu, Serge Gakpé, Vincent Muratori, Frédéric Nimani, Nicolas N'Koulou, Park Chu-young, Yohan Mollo and Yohann Thuram-Ulien. Lacombe led Monaco to eighth place in Ligue 1 in his first season in charge, but he was unable to replicate this performance in his second season and was sacked in January 2011, with Monaco in 17th place in Ligue 1. He was replaced by former coach Laurent Banide, who was unable to turn around the club's fortunes; Monaco finished the 2010–11 season in 18th, thus becoming relegated to Ligue 2.

In December 2011, 66.67% of the club was sold to the Russian oligarch and billionaire Dmitry Rybolovlev (via a trust under his daughter Ekaterina's name) while the club were bottom of Ligue 2. Banide was sacked due to this poor start to the 2011–12 season, and was replaced by Italian manager Marco Simone. Although he lifted the club to eighth by the end of the season, the club's board targeted promotion for the upcoming season and so fired him and appointed his compatriot Claudio Ranieri, whose attacking style of football saw the club score 64 goals in the 2012–13 season. With the club only losing four times, Monaco finished the season as champions, earning promotion back to Ligue 1. Using Rybolovlev's funds, Monaco were one of the biggest spenders in Europe in 2013, spending roughly £140 million, including a club-record £50 million for Radamel Falcao from Atlético Madrid and £40 million for James Rodríguez from Porto. Monaco finished in 2nd place in Ligue 1 in the 2013–14 season and Ranieri was replaced by Leonardo Jardim. The following season, Monaco cut expenses, selling Rodriguez to Real Madrid for €75m and loaning Falcao to Manchester United. Despite the high-profile departures, Monaco finished in third place in Ligue 1 and made it to the quarter-finals of the Champions League, defeating Arsenal in the Round of 16 before exiting at the hands of Juventus. Top-scorer from the 2013–14 season was Anthony Martial, who managed 12 goals in all competitions, departing for Manchester United in the summer for a fee of €60m, the highest fee paid for a teenager in football history. This, combined with the sales of Geoffrey Kondogbia, Layvin Kurzawa, Yannick Carrasco, Aymen Abdennour, Lucas Ocampos and others, saw the Monegasque club earn over €180m in the transfer window.

=== Ligue 1 triumph and aftermath (2016–present) ===
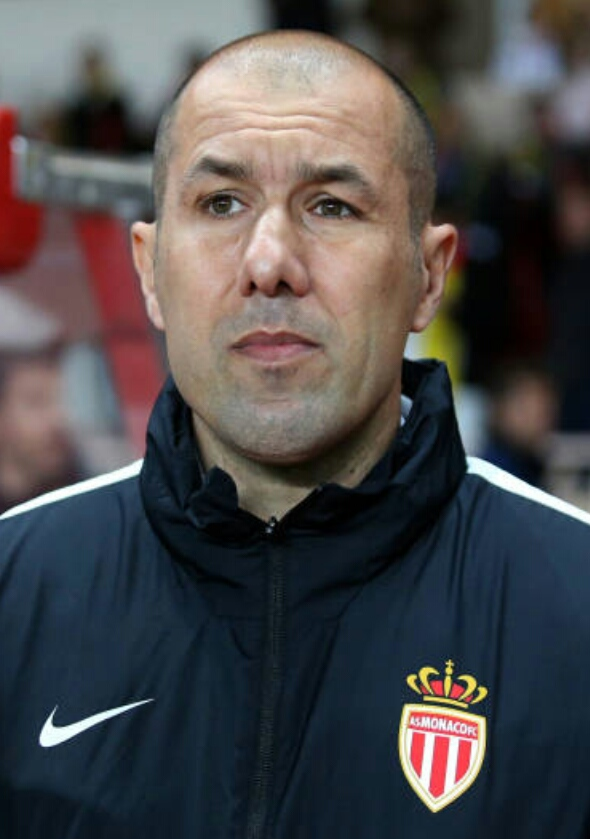
Leonardo Jardim led Monaco to the Ligue 1 title in 2016–17

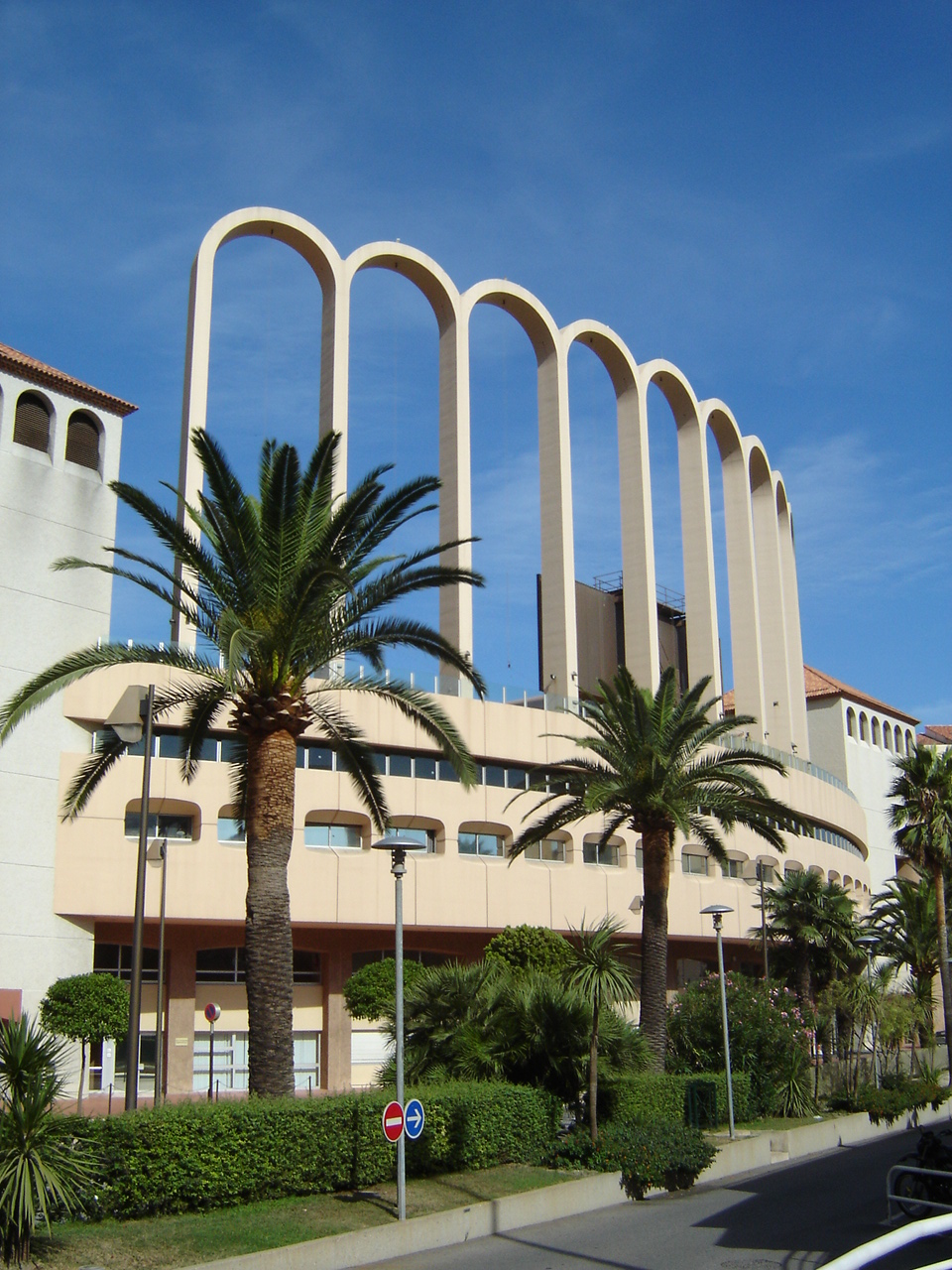
The iconic nine arches of the Stade Louis II

Monaco won the Ligue 1 title on 17 May 2017, defeating Saint-Étienne 2–0. Radamel Falcao and Kylian Mbappé scored 30 and 26 goals respectively to ensure a first Ligue 1 title in 17 years. Monaco went undefeated for the last 20 games of the season, winning 18 of those 20 games.

In the 2016–17 UEFA Champions League, Monaco staged a comeback in the Round of 16, losing the first leg 5–3 to Manchester City before beating the English side 3–1 at home to win on away goals. Monaco then defeated Borussia Dortmund 6–3 on aggregate before going down 4–1 over two legs to Juventus. In the summer, Kylian Mbappé went to rivals PSG on loan, with the obligation to buy for a fee of €180m, making it the second-highest transfer fee in history after Neymar. Teammates Bernardo Silva and Benjamin Mendy were sold to Manchester City for over €100m combined and Tiémoué Bakayoko was sold to Chelsea for €40 million. Monaco managed to finish second in the 2017–18 Ligue 1, 13 points behind league winners PSG. In the summer of 2018, Fabinho was sold to Liverpool for €42 million.

Jardim was replaced as coach by Thierry Henry in October 2018 after a poor start to the season. Henry was suspended from his job in January, and Jardim returned days later. Monaco finished the season in 17th, avoiding relegation playoffs by two points. In December 2019, Jardim was fired for the second time in 14 months, and former Spain manager Robert Moreno was appointed in his place.

In 2019–20, the COVID-19 pandemic suspended and then curtailed the football season. Monaco ended the season in ninth place. Moreno was sacked in July, and replaced by former Bayern Munich manager Niko Kovač, who finished the following season in third position with 78 points and winning 24 matches from 38 (63%). Kovač left at the start of the year 2022, being replaced by Philippe Clement. During Clement's tenure spanning two seasons, the club fell short of securing a spot in the Champions League group stages, instead they found themselves competing in the Europa League, where they participated in the initial knockout rounds. In addition, they were unable to secure European football in his last season with a sixth-place finish.

On 4 July 2023, Monaco appointed Adi Hütter who signed a two-year deal with the club. In his first season at the helm, he guided the club to a runner-up finish in the 2023–24 season, and qualification to the Champions League group stage for the first time since 2018–19.

The 2025-26 season was marked by a small crisis for AS Monaco. After a disappointing start to the season, Adi Hutter was replaced by Sébastien Pocognoli on 11 October 2025. However, AS Monaco disappointingly finished seventh in the league. In July 2026, Filipe Luís - former coach of CR Flamengo - replaced Pocognoli as head coach.

== Stadium ==
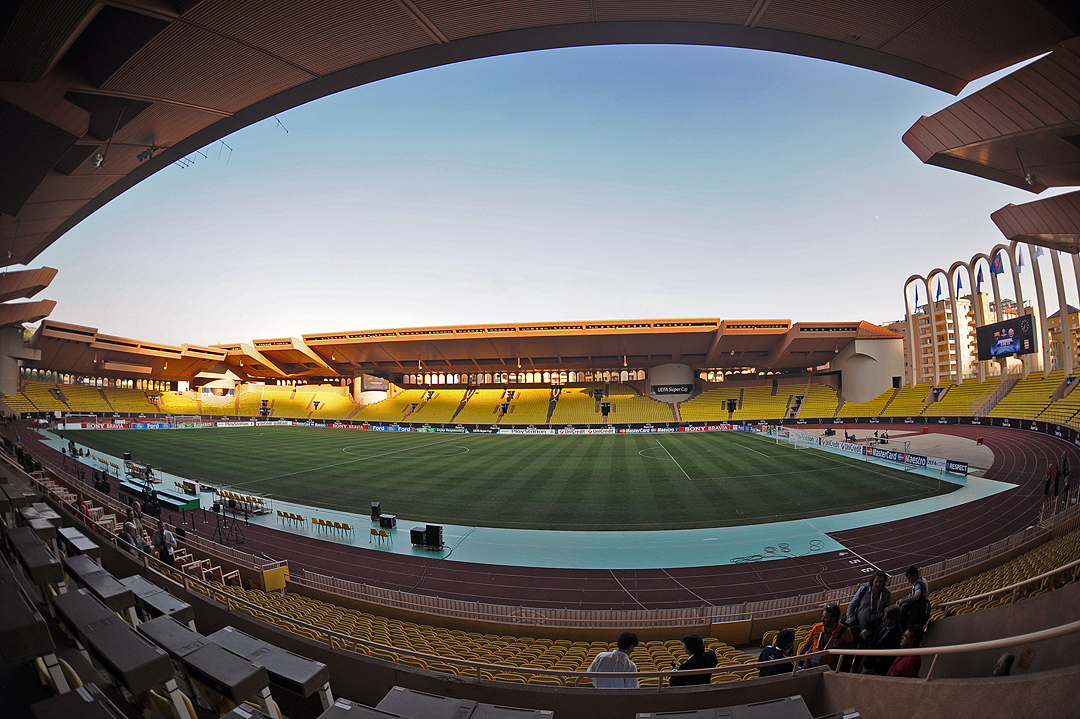
Monaco's home stadium, the Stade Louis II

Monaco played at the original Stade Louis II since its construction in 1939. In 1985, the stadium was replaced with the current iteration, built on a nearby site consisting of land reclaimed from the Mediterranean, which has become a recurring feature of the stadium's seaside surroundings. The stadium is named after the former Prince of Monaco Louis II and houses a total of 18,523 supporters. The Stade Louis II is noted for its nine iconic arches and has hosted numerous athletic events and European Cup finals. Every August from 1998 to 2012, it hosted each instance of the annual UEFA Super Cup, but from 2013 onward, UEFA decided to rotate the event throughout various stadiums.

== Players ==
=== Current squad ===
AS Monaco, before the match of the Conference League 2026/2027, against CSKA Sofia.

As of 9 September 2026

Note: Flags indicate national team as defined under FIFA eligibility rules; some limited exceptions apply. Players may hold more than one non-FIFA nationality.

No.	Pos.	Nation	Player
1	GK	FIN	Lukas Hradecky
2	DF	BRA	Vanderson
4	DF	NED	Jordan Teze
6	MF	SUI	Denis Zakaria (captain)
7	FW	FRA	Mathys Detourbet (on loan from Manchester City)
8	MF	SEN	Lamine Camara
9	FW	USA	Folarin Balogun
10	MF	RUS	Aleksandr Golovin (vice-captain)
11	FW	FRA	Matthis Abline
13	DF	FRA	Christian Mawissa
14	FW	DEN	Mika Biereth
15	MF	ENG	Eric Dier
16	GK	SUI	Philipp Köhn
17	MF	COD	Stanis Idumbo
18	MF	JPN	Takumi Minamino

No.	Pos.	Nation	Player
19	MF	FRA	Pape Cabral
20	DF	POR	Flávio Nazinho
22	DF	GHA	Mohammed Salisu
28	MF	FRA	Mamadou Coulibaly
29	FW	GER	Paris Brunner
31	FW	ESP	Ansu Fati
37	MF	FRA	Edan Diop
40	GK	FRA	Jules Stawiecki
41	MF	FRA	Aymen Assab
42	FW	CIV	Oumar Konaté
44	DF	BEL	Samuel Nibombé
46	MF	MAR	Anis Soubeir
47	FW	MAR	Safouane Benzahra
49	DF	FRA	Ilane Touré
72	DF	SEN	Sadibou Sané

=== Out on loan ===
Note: Flags indicate national team as defined under FIFA eligibility rules; some limited exceptions apply. Players may hold more than one non-FIFA nationality.

No.	Pos.	Nation	Player
—	GK	FRA	Yann Lienard (at Cercle Brugge until 30 June 2027)
—	GK	POL	Radosław Majecki (at Pafos until 30 June 2027)
—	DF	GER	Thilo Kehrer (at Ajax until 30 June 2027)

No.	Pos.	Nation	Player
—	DF	CIV	Valy Konaté (at Cercle Brugge until 30 June 2027)
—	FW	FRA	Lucas Michal (at Cercle Brugge until 30 June 2027)

== Club officials ==
=== Board of directors ===
Role	Name
Owners	(Russia) Monaco Sport Investment Ltd (66.67%); House of Grimaldi (33.33%)
President	(Russia) Dmitry Rybolovlev
Vice presidents	(Uruguay) Juan Sartori (Russia) Ekaterina Rybolovleva
CEO	(Brazil) Thiago Scuro
Deputy CEO	(Russia) Olga Dementeva
President of the Association	(France) Michel Aubery
Technical Director	(Mexico) Carlos Aviña
Performance Director	(France) Yann Le Meur
Director of youth development	(Belgium) Pascal De Maesschalk
Academy Director	(France) Sébastien Muet
Head of Athletic development	(France) Bruno Marrier
Head of Medical	(France) Alexandre Creuze
Sports Scientist	(France) Peio Komino
Performance Psychologist	(France) Makis Chamalidis
Scouting Coordinator	(France) Kamel Chniba
Head of Technology and Sports Knowledge	(France) Vignesh Jayanth
Recruitment analyst	(France) Maxime Verlinde
Marketing and Revenue Director	(France) Thibaut Chatelard
Organization, safety and security	(France) Antoine Vion
Head of communications	(France) Julien Crevelier
Team Manager	(France) Florent Barral

- Last updated: 2 January 2025

=== Current technical staff ===
Role	Name
Head coach	(Brazil) Filipe Luís
Assistant coaches	(Spain) Iván Palanco (France) Antony Santiago (Spain) Marc Ortí Esteban
Goalkeeping coach	(Finland) Jyri Nieminen
Fitness coaches	(Brazil) Diogo Linhares (France) Steeven Mandin (France) Alexandre Polizzi
Video analysts	(France) Félix Pourrat
Club Doctor	(France) Fabrice Busnel
Rehab coach	(France) Jérôme Palestri
Osteopath	(France) Éric Deroover
Physiotherapists	(France) François Ducourant (Croatia) Jerko Mikulić (France) Sophia Nigi (Switzerland) Simon Herzhaft (France) Florent Danieli
Podiatrist	(France) Émilie Behnam
Nutritionist	(France) Raphaël Tourraton
Storemen	(France) David Dejoie (France) Achmed Achouch (France) Paul Dupont

- Last updated: 2 January 2025

== Presidential history ==
Thiago Scuro, CEO of AS Monaco, 2026

Name	Period
1948–1951	(Monaco) Étienne Boéri
1952–1953	(Monaco) Roger-Félix Médecin
1954	(Monaco) Joseph Fissore
1955	(Monaco) Charles Campora
1956–1957	(Monaco) Roger-Félix Médecin
1958–1959	(Monaco) Charles Campora
1960–1963	(Monaco) Antoine Romagnan
1964–1968	(Monaco) Max Principale
1969	(Monaco) Edmond Aubert
1970–1972	(Monaco) Henry Rey
1973–1974	(Monaco) Henri Orengo
1975	(Monaco) Henri Corvetto
1976–2003	(Monaco) Jean-Louis Campora
2003–2004	(Monaco) Pierre Svara
2004–2008	(Monaco) Michel Pastor
2008–2009	(France) Jérôme de Bontin
2009–2011	(Monaco) Étienne Franzi
2011–	(Russia) Dmitry Rybolovlev

== Coaching history ==
Period	Name
1948–1950	(France) Jean Batmale
1950–1952	(Romania) Elek Schwartz
1952–1953	(Italy) Angelo Grizzetti
1953–1956	(Czechoslovakia) Ludvík Dupal
1956–1957	(Austria) Anton Marek
1958	(France) Louis Pirroni
1958–1963	(France) Lucien Leduc
1963–1965	(France) Roger Courtois
1965–1966	(France) Louis Pirroni
1966–1969	(France) Pierre Sinibaldi
1969–1970	(France) Louis Pirroni / (France) Robert Domergue
1970–1972	(France) Jean Luciano
1972–1974	(Argentina) Ruben Bravo
1974–1975	(Argentina) Alberto Muro
1976–1977	(Monaco) Armand Forchério
1977–1979	(France) Lucien Leduc
1979–1983	(France) Gérard Banide
1983–1986	(France) Lucien Muller
1986–1987	(Romania) Ștefan Kovács
1987–1994	(France) Arsène Wenger
1994	(France) Jean Petit
1994–1995	(France) Jean-Luc Ettori
1995	(France) Gérard Banide
1995–1999	(France) Jean Tigana
1999–2001	(France) Claude Puel
2001–2005	(France) Didier Deschamps
2005	(France) Jean Petit
2005–2006	(Italy) Francesco Guidolin
2006	(Romania) László Bölöni
2006–2007	(France) Laurent Banide
2007–2009	(Brazil) Ricardo Gomes
2009–2011	(France) Guy Lacombe
2011	(France) Laurent Banide
2011–2012	(Italy) Marco Simone
2012–2014	(Italy) Claudio Ranieri
2014–2018	(Portugal) Leonardo Jardim
2018–2019	(France) Thierry Henry
2019	(Portugal) Leonardo Jardim
2019–2020	(Spain) Robert Moreno
2020–2022	(Croatia) Niko Kovač
2022	(France) Stéphane Nado (caretaker)
2022–2023	(Belgium) Philippe Clement
2023–2025	(Austria) Adi Hütter
2025–2026	(Belgium) Sébastien Pocognoli
2026–	(Brazil) Filipe Luís

== Honours ==
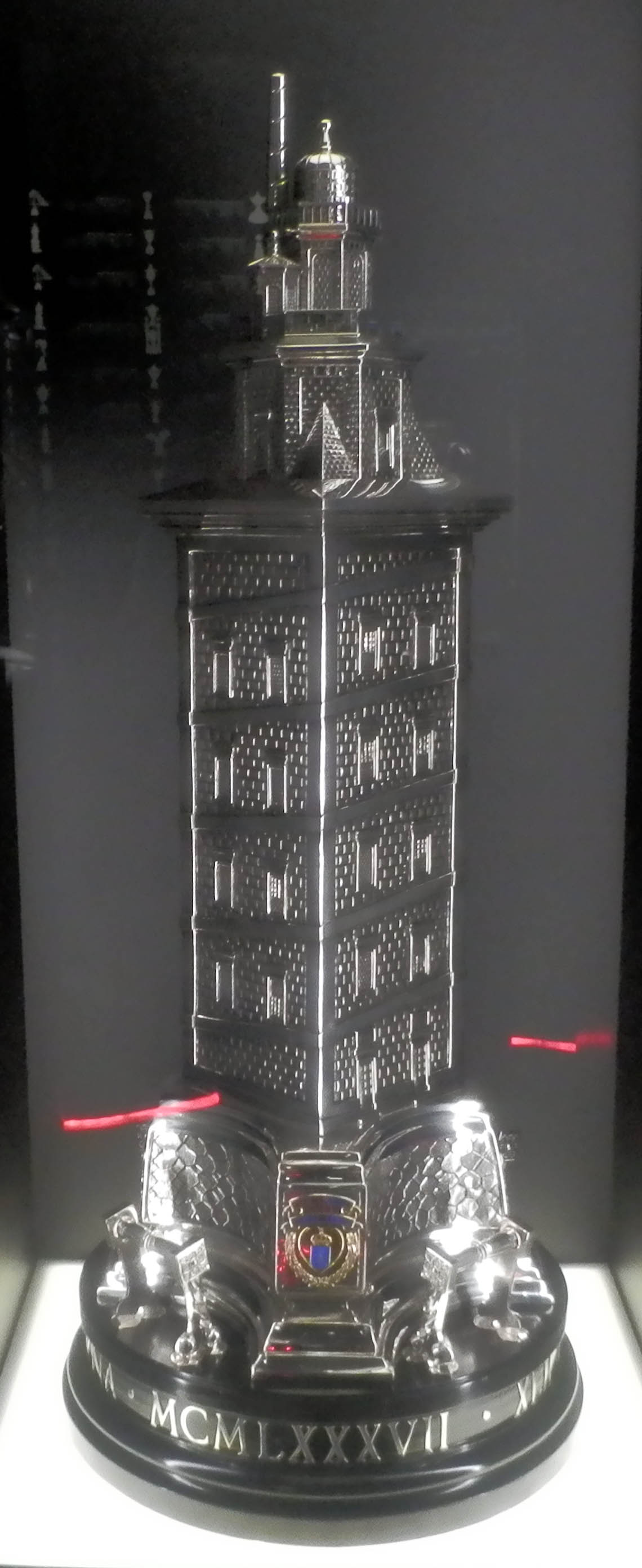
AS Monaco won the Teresa Herrera Trophy in 1963.

=== Domestic competitions ===
- Ligue 1
  - Winners (8): 1960–61, 1962–63, 1977–78, 1981–82, 1987–88, 1996–97, 1999–2000, 2016–17
  - Runners-up (8): 1963–64, 1983–84, 1990–91, 1991–92, 2002–03, 2013–14, 2017–18, 2023–24
- Ligue 2
  - Winners (1): 2012–13
  - Runners-up (3): 1952–53, 1970–71, 1976–77
- Championnat de France Amateur
  - Winners (3): 1963–64, 1970–71, 2007–08
- Coupe de France
  - Winners (5): 1959–60, 1962–63, 1979–80, 1984–85, 1990–91
  - Runners-up (5): 1973–74, 1983–84, 1988–89, 2009–10, 2020–21
- Coupe de la Ligue
  - Winners (1): 2002–03
  - Runners-up (3): 2000–01, 2016–17, 2017–18
- Trophée des Champions
  - Winners (4): 1961, 1985, 1997, 2000
  - Runners-up (4): 1960, 2017, 2018, 2024
- Coupe Charles Drago
  - Winners: 1961

=== European ===
- European Cup Winners' Cup
  - Runners-up (1): 1991–92
- UEFA Champions League
  - Runners-up (1): 2003–04

=== Pre Season Tournament ===
- Joan Gamper Cup
  - Winners (1): 2024
- Mohammed V Cup
  - Winners (1): 1988

=== UEFA club coefficient ranking ===
As of 18 September 2026

Rank	Team	Points
49	(Denmark) Midtjylland	41.250
50	(Spain) Villareal	41.000
51	Monaco	41.000
52	(Czech Republic) Slavia Prague	40.000
53	(Spain) Athletic Bilbao	38.750

== Player records ==
Bold indicates players who play still at the club.

As of 19 May 2024

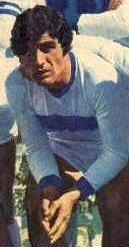
Delio Onnis scored a club record 223 goals for Monaco.

=== Most appearances ===
Competitive, professional matches only.

#	Name	Years	Matches
1	(France) Jean-Luc Ettori	1975–1994	755
2	(France) Claude Puel	1979–1996	602
3	(France) Jean Petit	1969–1982	428
4	(France) Manuel Amoros	1980–1989	349
5	(France) Christian Dalger	1971–1980	334
6	(France) Marcel Dib	1985–1993	326
7	(France) François Ludo	1953–1962	319
8	(France) Luc Sonor	1986–1995	315
9	(France) Michel Hidalgo	1957–1966	304
10	(Monaco) Armand Forchério	1961–1972	303

=== Top goalscorers ===
Competitive, professional matches only.

#	Name	Years	Goals
1	(Argentina) (Italy) Delio Onnis	1973–1980	223
2	(France) Wissam Ben Yedder	2019–2024	118
3	(France) Lucien Cossou	1959–1965	115
4	(France) Christian Dalger	1971–1980	89
5	(Colombia) Radamel Falcao	2013–2019	83
6	(France) Jean Petit	1969–1982	78
7	(Nigeria) Victor Ikpeba	1993–1999	77
8	(France) Yvon Douis	1961–1967	74
9	(France) Youri Djorkaeff	1990–1995	68
10	(Brazil) Sonny Anderson	1994–1997	67
10	(Democratic Republic of the Congo) Shabani Nonda	2000–2005	67
