= Rybolovlev =

Rybolovlev (Russian: Рыболовлев, from рыболов meaning fisherman) is a Russian masculine surname, its feminine counterpart is Rybolovleva. It may refer to

- Dmitry Rybolovlev (born 1966), Russian Oligarch, businessman, investor, and philanthropist
- Ekaterina Rybolovleva (born 1989), Russian businesswoman, equestrian and socialite, daughter of Dmitry
