= Church of the Nativity of St. John the Baptist (Kamenny Island) =

Coordinates: 59.980892°N 30.300508°E

- Церковь Рождества Иоанна Предтечи
- Church of the Nativity of St. John the Baptist
- Location: Kamenny Island, Saint Petersburg
- Country: Russia
- Denomination: Russian Orthodox

History
- Status: Parish church

Architecture
- Functional status: Active
- Architect: Yury Felten
- Style: Gothic Revival
- Years built: 1776–1778
- Completed: 1778

Administration
- Diocese: Diocese of Saint Petersburg

The Church of the Nativity of St. John the Baptist (Russian: Храм Рождества́ Иоа́нна Предте́чи) is a parish church in Saint Petersburg near the Kamenny Island palace.

The church was built in 1778 per the design of architect Yury Felten in the Russian Pseudo-Gothic style.

== History ==
The church had previously closed on December 13, 1937, under Archpriest Nikolai Lomakin as rector. The church's property was confiscated, and a fire destroyed the murals and the few remaining furnishings.

== Architecture ==
The church is in the neo-Gothic style and resembles a Catholic church.
