= Conception Convent =

Russian Orthodox stauropegic convent

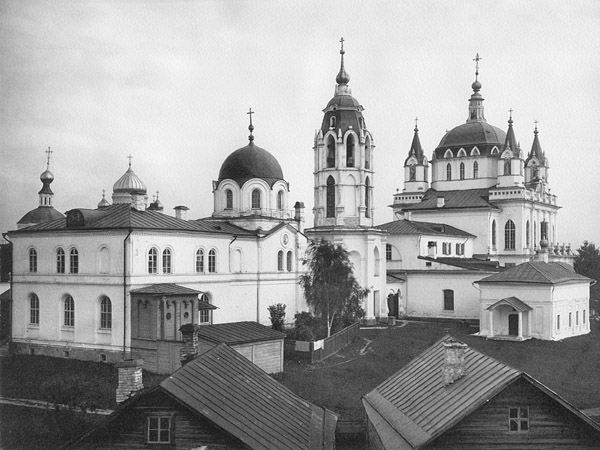
- Conception Convent in 1882
- Interactive map of Conception Convent

Monastery information
- Other name: Zachatyevsky Monastery
- Order: Orthodox
- Established: 1360, 1584
- Disestablished: 1927
- Reestablished: 1995
- Diocese: Moscow

People
- Founders: Alexius, Metropolitan of Moscow (1360), Feodor I (1584)
- Abbot: Hegumenia Juliania

Site
- Location: Moscow, Russia
- Coordinates: 55°44′23″N 37°35′28″E

The Conception Convent or Zachatyevsky Monastery (Russian: Зачатьевский монастырь, romanized: Zachat'yevskiy monastyr') is a Russian Orthodox stauropegic convent on the northern bank of the Moskva River in Khamovniki District of Moscow. The convent was closed by the Bolsheviks in 1918 and did not reopen until 1995.

== History ==
Later sources claim that the convent occupies the site of the original Alekseyevsky (Alexis) Convent, the oldest nunnery in Moscow. It is believed to have been founded by Alexius, Metropolitan of Moscow in 1360 and was consecrated to the Feast of the Conception of Saint Anne. Notable nuns included Alexis's own sisters Eupraxia and Juliana, both canonized by the Russian Orthodox Church in 2000.

After the great fire of 1547, the convent was relocated eastward to the present-day site of the Cathedral of Christ the Saviour. In 1584, a new convent was established on the old site by Feodor I of Russia and his wife, Irina Godunova. The couple, being childless, asked the nuns of the Conception Convent to pray for the conception of their own child. (Another version asserts that the new convent was restored on the old site by the surviving nuns of the Alexeyevsky Convent immediately after the 1547 fire.) It was looted and sustained much damage during the Time of Troubles.

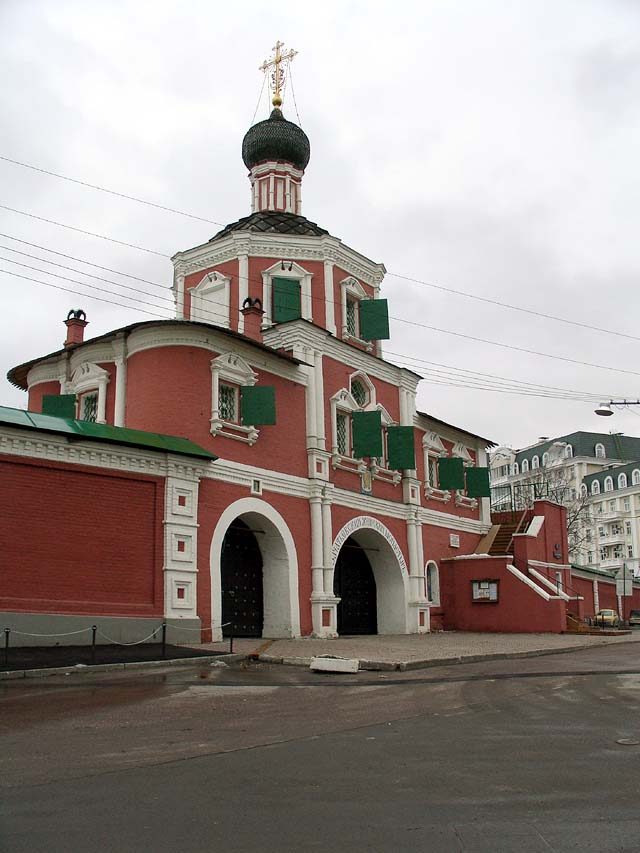
The Naryshkin Baroque barbican church of 1696

The extant church over the main gate was built in 1696 with funds provided by the Rimsky-Korsakov noble family. This Naryshkin Baroque church and walls are the only remains of the convent as it existed before the Russian Revolution of 1917. The katholikon was built in 1804-1807 in the Russian Gothic style to Rodion Kazakov's designs. It was pulled down in the 1920s.

In the Soviet period, the convent buildings were used as a prison for juvenile delinquents. A school building was constructed on the site of the katholikon. A venerated icon of the Theotokos the Merciful was transferred to the nearby parish Church of St. Elijah.

== Reconstruction ==
Efforts to revive the convent began in 1991. It was officially reestablished in May 1995. By 2005, the church of St. Anne (third from right on the 1882 photograph) was completed. The Russian Orthodox Church declared the Gothic-influenced style of the old katholikon improper for a Russian Orthodox temple and demanded it to be rebuilt in a more traditional Byzantine style. In October 2006, Yuri Luzhkov approved a Russian Revival design by Alexander Obolensky on condition that the building's height would be decreased.

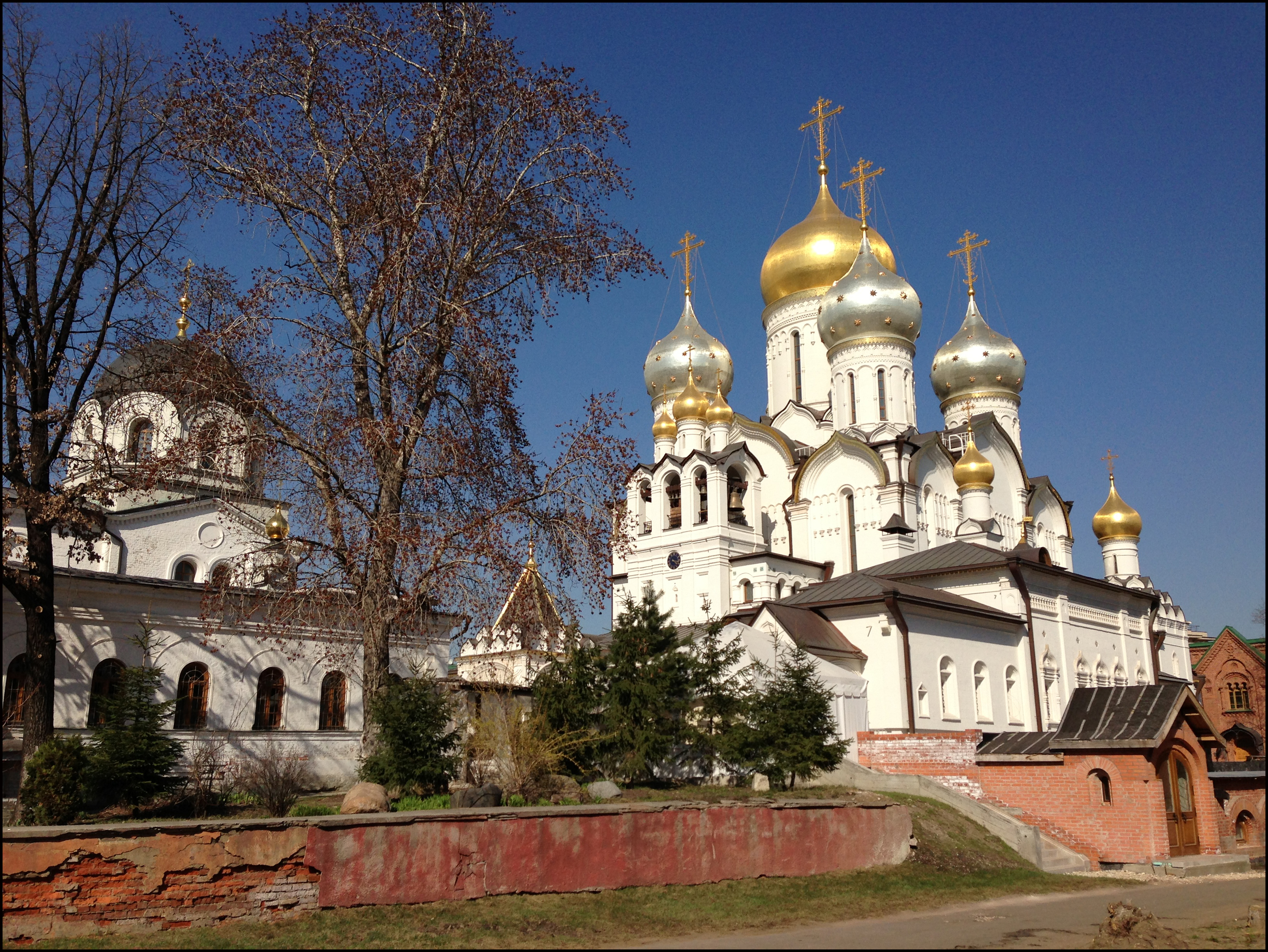
The enormous modern katholikon

As of June, 2009, the new five-domed katholikon, made of in situ concrete, was structurally complete. On November 25, 2010 the Cathedral of the Nativity of Our Lady was consecrated. Construction works were financed by billionaire Dmitry Rybolovlev, who was awarded the Order of St. Seraphim of Sarov by Patriarch Kirill for funding this project.

== Public transportation access ==
Moscow Metro: Kropotkinskaya, Park Kultury-Radialnaya

Convent territory is open for general public in daytime, until the end of 5pm Vespers, with certain limitations; photography inside the walls requires prior consent of hegumenia Iuliania.
