= Juan Sartori =

Uruguayan politician (born 1981)

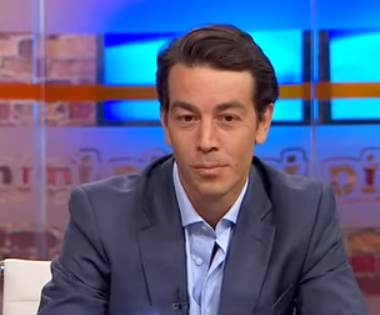
- Sartori in 2019

Senator of Uruguay
- In office 15 February 2020 – 15 February 2025

Personal details
- Born: Juan José Sartori Piñeyro; 6 February 1981 (age 45) Montevideo, Uruguay
- Party: National Party
- Spouse: Ekaterina Rybolovleva (m. 2015)
- Children: 3
- Education: University of Lausanne
- Occupation: Businessman; Politician
- Known for: Co-owner of Sunderland; Vice-president of AS Monaco
- Net worth: £80 million

Juan José Sartori Piñeyro (born 6 February 1981) is a Uruguayan businessman and politician. He is the co-owner of Sunderland, vice-president of AS Monaco and president and founder of Union Group, a privately owned investment management and private equity firm that holds significant interests across an array of industries worldwide, including agriculture, technology, energy and real estate.

A member of the National Party, he ran in the party's 2019 presidential primaries. In that year's general election, he was elected a Senator of the Republic for the 49th Legislature, taking office in February 2020.

== Early life ==
Sartori was born at the Italian Hospital in the capital city of Montevideo on 6 February 1981 to Gustavo Sartori and Rosina Piñeyro. Sartori is of paternal Italian and maternal Spanish descent. At the age of twelve, Sartori moved to Europe and lived in a number of countries, starting in France, while his mother worked for the United Nations. He went on to study in Switzerland, where he obtained his bachelor's degree in economics and business from the University of Lausanne in 2002.

== Career ==
=== Union Group ===
Sartori's business career began in Switzerland in 2003 when, having just graduated from university, he founded Union Capital Group, which evolved into a multi-billion-dollar assets under management investment firm. Expanding into private equity, Sartori set up Union Group in Uruguay in 2007 with a blueberry farming business. To seek out further investors, Sartori and his business partner, Oscar Costa, recruited Ernesto Cardozo Vasquez, who served as Undersecretary of the Ministry of Livestock, Agriculture, and Fisheries in Uruguay between 2003- 2005 to lead the investment rounds. Union Group's portfolio includes private and public companies worldwide.

In 2013, Union Group's agricultural arm, one of the biggest agricultural organizations in Uruguay, floated on the Montevideo Stock Exchange. In June 2014, it accounted for approximately 70 percent of its market capitalisation, making it the largest company listed on the exchange.

In 2010, Sartori began investing in energy generation projects. In 2013, Union Group acquired hydropower company Generacion Andina from German utility firm EnBW. In 2018, Polaris Infrastructure Inc. (TSX: PIF), a Canadian business, purchased Union Group's energy division.

Sartori is the co-founder and chairman of NYSE-listed Union Acquisition Corp (UAC), a SPAC or blank check company, which has taken a number of organizations public over recent years, such as crop technology firm Bioceres Crop Solutions (Nasdaq: BIOX) in 2018, and global healthcare business, Procaps Group (Nasdaq: PROC) in 2021.

=== Tether ===
In 2025, Sartori was made Head of Special Projects for Tether Holdings SA, the blockchain-enabled company behind USDT (Tether), the largest stablecoin pegged 1:1 to flat currencies like the US dollar. In March 2026, Tether nominated Sartori to the board of directors of Gold.com, an alternative asset management platform specialising in precious metals. This announcement follows Tether's commitment in January 2026 to commit 10-15% of its investment portfolio in physical gold and the retirement of long-term Gold.com director Beverly Lepine.

=== Politics ===
In December 2018, Sartori presented his nomination to National Party pre-candidate for President of Uruguay for the 2019 presidential primaries. The election was held on 30 June 2019. Sartori carried out a noteworthy campaign, labelled a "political phenomenon" by the Associated Press. He collected 20.68% of the vote, which saw him finish second of six behind Luis Lacalle Pou, who was elected as the party's candidate The Atlante Films documentary "Juan Sartori: behind the phenomenon" follows Sartori on the campaign trail.

Sartori ran for the Senate in the October 2019 general election and was elected senator, making him the youngest person to currently hold this title, taking up the position on 15 February 2020. He sits on the Senate Committees of International Affairs, Environment, Development and Inclusion, and is president of the Industry Committee. Additionally, he forms part of the Partido Nacional's governing body.

=== Football ===
Sartori is a passionate football fan. He is a co-owner of Sunderland. "Sunderland is a huge club, the seventh largest in England, a club with a lot of history and a big following, and that’s what made it attractive", he said following the 2018 acquisition. He sits on the board as a non-executive director. In 2022, the club, based in the North East of England, won the League One playoffs, and played following season in the EFL Championship, the second most important division in English football. In 2025, the team was promoted to the Premier League. He is also a board member and vice president of Monaco. In terms of support, Sartori is a fan of Club Nacional, Barcelona and Paris Saint-Germain.

In March 2026, Nigel Farage said he had been invited by a director of Sunderland to attend a home match before the end of the club's 2025–26 season. News articles reported Sartori was the director who invited Farage after meeting him at the 56th World Economic Forum. The response from Sunderland fans was split, with some supporting Farage, while others voiced strong opposition to the invitation. Some fans made a petition to oppose the visit. Later, in April 2026, Farage said while he did still want to meet football club directors, he no longer had immediate plans to attend a Sunderland match. By this time, the petition against him visiting Sunderland had reached more than 4,000 signatures.

== Personal life ==
Sartori married Russian heiress and equestrian Ekaterina Rybolovleva on 21 October 2015, and as a result, Sartori's father-in-law is Russian oligarch and billionaire businessman Dmitry Rybolovlev, who is the majority owner and president of Monaco's football club Monaco. Sartori met Ekaterina at one of her birthday parties in Greece. The wedding was held on the Greek island of Skorpios, which she bought from Athina Onassis in 2013. The couple have two children together, Alexander John and Giulia Victoria. Sartori also has an older daughter, Isabella, from a previous marriage.

Sartori has a net worth of approximately £80 million as of February 2024.
