= Anna I (yacht) =

Dutch yacht

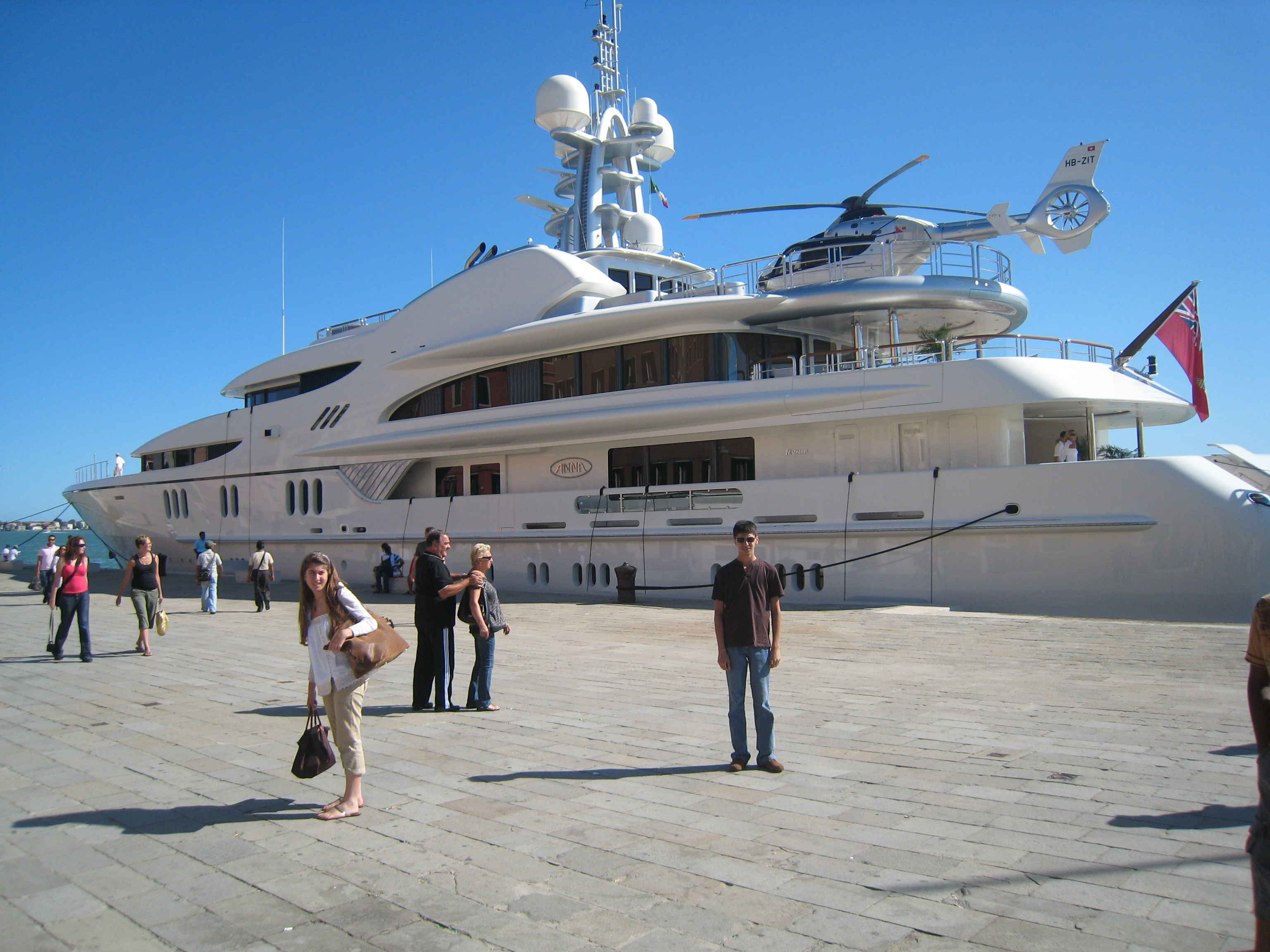

History

Cayman Islands
- Name: Anna I
- Owner: Dmitry Rybolovlev
- Builder: Feadship
- Yard number: 673
- Launched: April 2007
- In service: May 2007
- Identification: IMO number: 1008994; MMSI number: 319271000; Callsign: ZCPW7
- Status: For sale

General characteristics
- Class & type: Motor yacht
- Tonnage: 1549 gross tons
- Length: 67 m (220 ft)
- Beam: 13.10 m (43.0 ft)
- Draught: 3.6 m (12 ft)
- Propulsion: twin 2,000hp Caterpillar 3516B engines
- Speed: 13 knots (24 km/h) (cruise); 16.7 knots (31 km/h) (max)
- Capacity: 12 guests
- Crew: 18

The 67 m (220 ft) superyacht Anna I was launched by Feadship in 2007 at their Aalsmeer yard. British designer Michael Leach designed both the interior and exterior of Anna I. She was put up for sale after her owner took delivery of his new 110 m (360 ft) yacht, also named Anna.

== Design ==
Anna I features a 67 m (220 ft) by 13.10 m (43.0 ft) displacement steel hull with a draught of 3.60 m (11.8 ft) and aluminium superstructure, with teak decks. The yacht is Lloyd's registered, issued by Cayman Islands.

== Engines ==
She is powered by twin 2,000 hp Caterpillar 3516B engines.

== See also ==
- List of motor yachts by length
- List of yachts built by Feadship
