= Reclining Nude on Blue Cushion =

1916 painting by Amedeo Modigliani

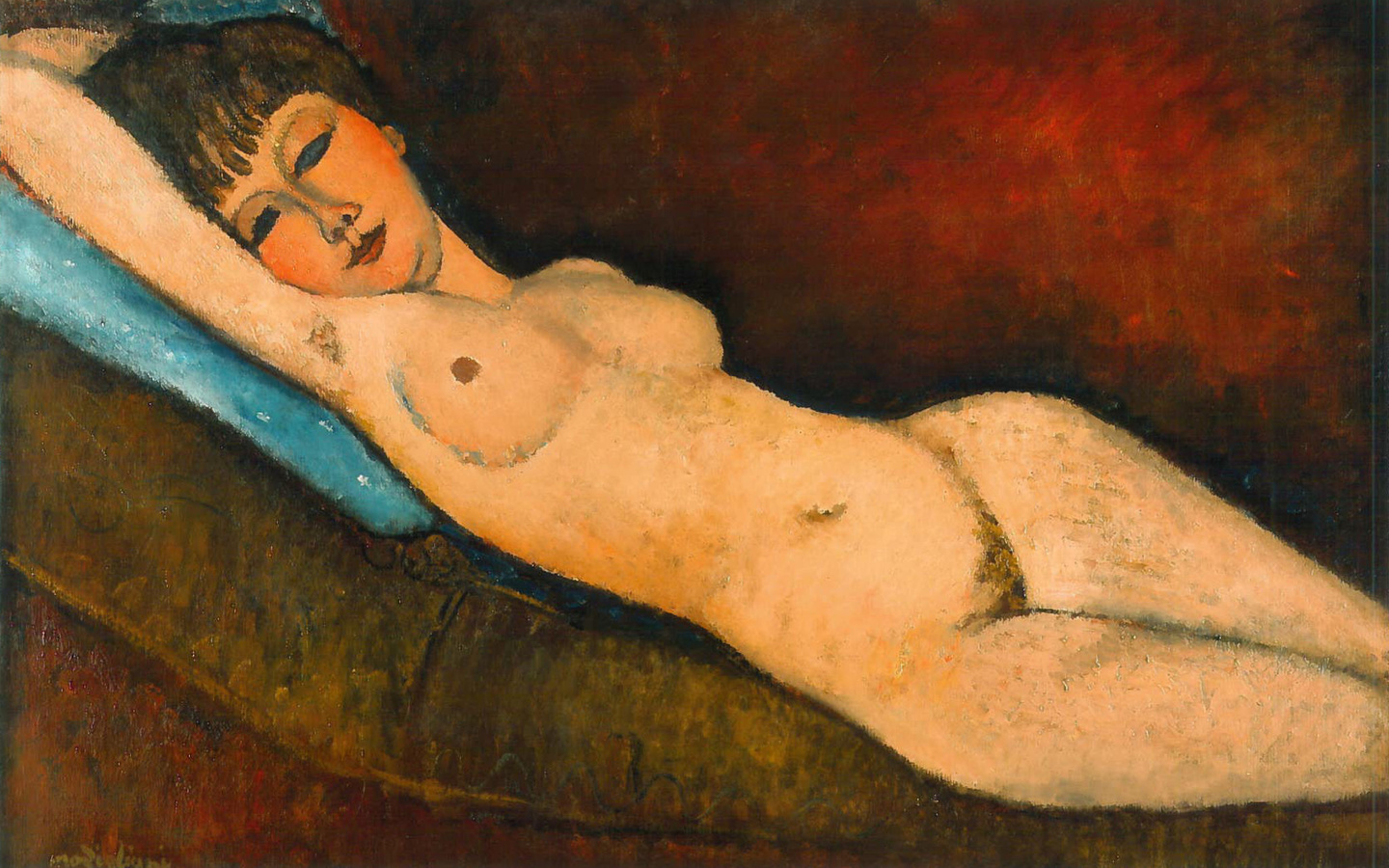
- Artist: Amedeo Modigliani
- Year: 1916
- Medium: oil on canvas
- Dimensions: 60.1 cm × 92.1 cm (23.7 in × 36.3 in)
- Owner: Dmitry Rybolovlev

Reclining Nude on Blue Cushion (French: Nu Couché au coussin Bleu) is an oil on canvas painting by Italian artist Amedeo Modigliani created in 1916. The painting is one of the dozens of nudes created by Modigliani between 1916 and 1919.

== Description ==
The nudes of this period are "displayed boldly, with only the faintest suggestion of setting.... neither demure nor provocative, they are depicted with a degree of objectivity. Yet the uniformly thick, rough application of paint—as if applied by a sculptor's hand—is more concerned with mass and the visceral perception of the female body than with titillation and the re-creation of translucent, tactile flesh". Simultaneously abstracted and erotically detailed, they exhibit a formal grace, referencing nude figures of the Italian Renaissance while at the same time objectifying their subjects' sexuality; they "exemplify his position between tradition and modernism".

== Provenance ==
In 2012, the painting was acquired by Russian businessman and collector Dmitry Rybolovlev from billionaire Stephen Cohen of S.A.C. Capital Advisors for $118 million.
