= Ekaterina Rybolovleva =

Russian businesswoman

Ekaterina Dmitrievna Rybolovleva (born 4 June 1989, in Perm, Soviet Union) is a businesswoman, equestrian and socialite. She is the daughter of Russian oligarch Dmitry Rybolovlev and the owner of several businesses and properties, including those on the islands of Skorpios and Sparti. Rybolovleva also owns the football club AS Monaco FC via a trust in her name, while her father serves as the club president.

== Equestrian career ==
Rybolovleva began riding horses at age 11 and has been trained by British show jumper and three-time Olympian Ben Maher.

On 17 March 2007, she took part in the Officiel d’Evordes showjumping competition, where she placed in the first round R2/L2. In August 2007, she participated in a show jumping competition in Verbier, where she took the third position R3/M. In 2008, she placed in the first round E3/M1 in the Officiel d’Evordes, riding her mare, Eole Perruques. In addition to Eole Perruques, Rybolovleva owns several other horses which she rides in competition, Uropo, Cherubin van de Helle, Lucky the Man, Obelix du Thot, and Celesto Z.

She first participated in the Gucci Masters in 2009, and became a winner in December 2010, with Malin Baryard-Johnsson, after performing to the music track "Rasputin" by Boney M. In 2011, she participated in the new Gucci Masters with Kevin Staut, with a choreography to musical "Moulin Rouge". She won the Gucci Masters in 2012.

== Investments ==
In 2011, a trust acting in the interest of Rybolovleva acquired a 627 square meter (6,700 square feet) apartment in New York for $88 million. The price for the penthouse apartment at 15 Central Park West was, at the time of the transaction, a record for the city. The apartment has served as Rybolovleva's home in the US whenever she attended psychology and finance classes at Harvard Extension School. That same year, a trust acting in Rybolovleva's interest purchased a Hawaiian mansion, on Kauai's North Shore, from Will Smith and Jada Pinkett Smith. At the time, the property was 7 acres. The trust added a 21-acre adjacent lot, quadrupling the size of the oceanfront property.

In 2013, a company belonging to a trust acting in the interest of Rybolovleva completed the purchase of a group of companies formerly owned by Athina Onassis, the granddaughter of shipping magnate Aristotle Onassis. Amongst the assets of this group of companies were the islands of Skorpios and Sparti, an uninhabited island 2 kilometers North of Skorpios. The 74-acre island of Skorpios, the second-most valuable private island in the world, was made famous by Aristotle Onassis's wedding to Jackie Kennedy there in 1968. Rybolovleva has said that she views the acquisition of the islands, which she referred to as her "private shelter" and "home away from home", as a "long-term financial investment" which she plans to develop using "environmentally friendly technology." The current plans for the island include the development of a green luxury accommodation complex with a multi sports facility, including an Olympic-sized horseback riding arena, a cinema, a spa and a large artificial lake. The development is projected to cost up to €165 million.

The mayor of neighboring Lefkada, Kostas Aravanis, and other local officials met with Ryobovleva and her father shortly after the sale was announced. Aravanis said that Rybolovleva's investment in Skorpios "could help the local economy, because some people will be employed there, and it will promote the area internationally."

Onassis stated in his will that the island would remain in the family as long as they could afford to cover its maintenance expenses. According to the will, if his descendants could not cover the expenses, the island would be donated either to Olympic Airways or to the state. Therefore, the island is now leased to the heiress for 99 years time, still under the ownership of Athina Onassis.

Rybolovleva's ownership of some assets, including the New York apartment and Skorpios, was challenged by her mother, Elena, during her divorce from Rybolovlev. In a major ruling in May 2014, a Geneva court confirmed the validity of the trust structures through which Rybolovleva owns these assets, meaning they are immune from legal challenge in the case.

== AS Monaco ==
On 28 February 2023, Ekaterina Rybolovleva was elected AS Monaco’s vice-president. She replaced Oleg Petrov, who had been in the office since 2019. Rybolovleva has been a member of the ASM Board of Directors since 2011. Her husband Juan Sartori is currently also a board member, and vice president of AS Monaco Football Club, since 2021.

== Personal life ==
Rybolovleva married Uruguayan businessman and politician Juan Sartori on 21 October 2015, in a private ceremony in Skorpios, one day after her parents announced that they had reached a settlement in their 7-year divorce battle. The wedding was only the second one on the island since that of Aristotle Onassis and Jacqueline Kennedy in 1968. Rybolovleva met Sartori at one of her birthday parties in Greece.

The couple have two children. They reside in Uruguay, where Sartori was recently a Senator. In 2019, Sartori was a candidate for the National Party's primaries for the 2019 Uruguayan presidential election and obtained 20% of the votes. Rybolovleva supported him during his campaign trail. During the presidential election, Sartori and Rybolovleva visited an animal shelter and adopted a two-month-old puppy, Esperanza.

Sartori is one of the major shareholders of Premier League football team Sunderland AFC.
