= Dmitry Rybolovlev =

Russian businessman (born 1966)

- Дмитрий Рыболовлев
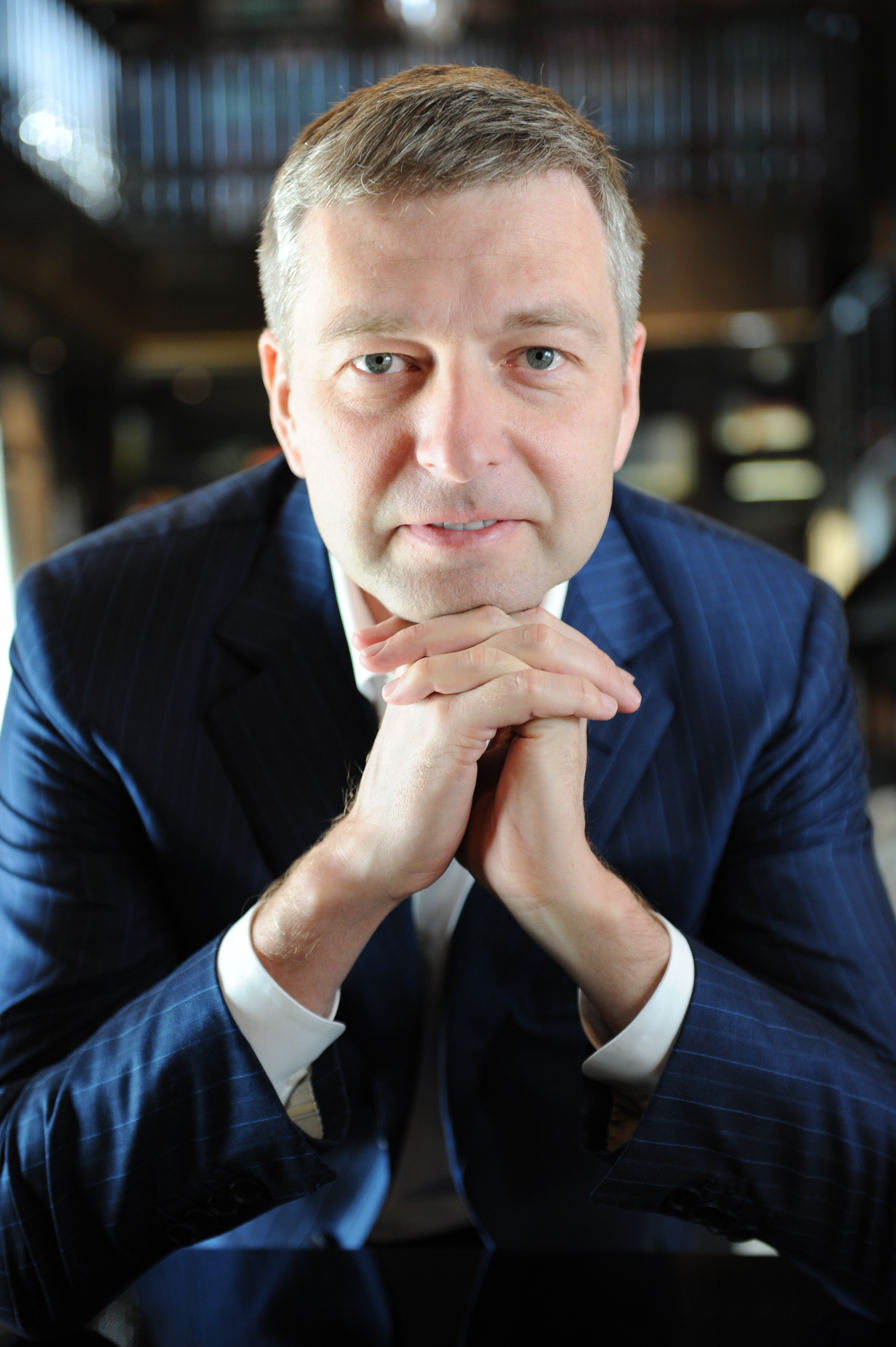
- Rybolovlev in 2012
- Born: Dmitry Yevgenyevich Rybolovlev; 22 November 1966 (age 60); Perm, Russian SFSR, Soviet Union
- Citizenship: Russian, Cypriot
- Known for: President of AS Monaco (Note: The club was owned by a trust that attributed to Ekaterina Rybolovleva, daughter of Dmitry.); Owner of Cercle Brugge
- Spouse: Elena Rybolovleva (m. 1987; div. 2015)
- Children: Ekaterina and Anna

Dmitry Yevgenyevich Rybolovlev (Russian: Дмитрий Евгеньевич Рыболовлев, IPA: [ˈdmʲitrʲɪj jɪvˈɡʲenʲjɪvʲɪtɕ rɨbɐˈlovlʲɪf]; born 22 November 1966) is a Russian oligarch, billionaire businessman, and investor.

Rybolovlev became chairman of the Russian fertilizer producer Uralkali in 1995. In 2010, he sold his majority share of Uralkali to three Kremlin-linked oligarchs for $6.5 billion. As of 2021, Rybolovlev had a reported net worth of $6.7 billion, which ranked him 391st on Forbes's list of billionaires.

In 2011, Rybolovlev became the majority owner and president of the football club Monaco. He is one of the alleged victims of Swiss art transporter Yves Bouvier as part of the Bouvier Affair.

His hobbies include sailing where his yachts named Skorpios race competitively, winning the ClubSwan 50 World Championship and taking line honour in the 2021 Fastnet Race sailing his ClubSwan 125.

== Early life and education ==
Dmitry Rybolovlev was born in a Russian family, in Perm. His parents worked at the department at the Perm State Medical University named after Academician E.A. Wagner.

== Business career ==
He entered the business world in 1990 after graduating from the Perm Medical Institute. He worked as a doctor before going into business. As a doctor's income was no longer enough to comfortably support a family during the final years of the Soviet Union, he began his first business project, a small medical enterprise that served the workers of local factories he set up together with his father, a professor of medicine.

Rybolovlev earned his first million dollars by reselling products, which the factories used to pay for in services rather than cash as was then a common practice in Russia.

In 1992, Rybolovlev went to Moscow to take a business course and received a brokerage license from the Russian Ministry of Finance, one of the first in Russia and the first in the Perm region, which permitted him to trade and deal with securities. Upon his return to Perm, he founded a brokerage and investment company and started buying up shares of local enterprises such as Uralkali, Silvinit, Azot, Metafrax, and Solikamskbumprom.

=== Uralkali ===
In early 1994, Rybolovlev persuaded directors of these and some other enterprises to establish a bank, which he headed.

He later decided to concentrate on two assets, Uralkali and Silvinit, given that the Russian potash industry was underdeveloped at the time due to the lack of interest from investors, unlike in the oil and gas sectors. Additionally, no one had been able to acquire controlling stakes in the industry's firms. From 1993 to 1995, Rybolovlev's portfolio included securities of Uralkali, Silvinit, Metafrax and Neftekhimik. These companies jointly developed the Verkhnekamskoye potash deposit, one of the world's largest.

The violent nature of capital accumulation in early to mid-1990s Russia, including in the country's industrially developed regions like the Perm Krai, gave rise to violent criminals battling over control of companies and imposing "protection" fees on businesses.

Refusing to cooperate with criminal gangs, Rybolovlev was forced to hire a bodyguard in 1993 before moving his family to safety in Switzerland in 1995. He also assigned bodyguards to all the directors of his enterprises, with only one, Evgeny Panteleimonov, director of Neftekhimik, refusing to accept. Together with Rybolovlev, he had insisted on stopping the supply of the company's products through a mafia-controlled straw firm, "Trade House FD". That same year, Evgeny Panteleimonov was killed at the doorstep of his house.

A local gangster, Oleg Lomakin, turned out to be the organizer of the murder and was detained in April 1996. He accused Rybolovlev of being behind the murder, which led to Rybolovlev being arrested and spending 11 months in pretrial detention. Lomakin eventually withdrew his testimony, and, together with two accomplices, was sentenced to 15 years in prison for the murder of Panteleimonov. The judge concluded that the gangsters had killed the director of the company for breaking off relations with "Trade House FD".

In 1997, Rybolovlev was acquitted by courts of law at three levels, including the Presidium of the Supreme Court of the Russian Federation. In media reports, he stated that he was extorted in jail to sell the shares of his company in exchange for his freedom, but had refused.

==== Growth and IPO ====
Over the next 15 years, Rybolovlev focused on developing Uralkali and eventually built it into a major global enterprise.

According to the Russian business newspaper Vedomosti, by 2000 he had consolidated his controlling interest in the company and begun to reform and develop it. While in 2000 the capitalization of Uralkali was around $15 million, in eight years it reached $20 billion. While the overall market outlook for mineral fertilizers improved over this time, reforms made under Rybolovlev's leadership played an important role in transforming a Soviet-era enterprise into a worldwide industry leader. In 2000, Rybolovlev replaced the entire management of Uralkali, setting an increase in labor productivity as a key indicator, and as a result, it increased by 2.5 times in the period from 2000 to 2007.

Following this rapid growth throughout the early 2000s, in 2002 Uralkali built the Baltic Bulk Terminal in St. Petersburg port as its own transport hub, providing the company with a high-tech universal transshipment complex for mineral fertilizers, and thereby improving logistics capabilities.

In 2005, Uralkali and Belarusian potash producer Belaruskali combined their trade flows via a single trader, the Belarusian Potash Company (BPC). There were plans to float Uralkali on the London Stock Exchange in 2006, but Rybolovlev canceled the listing after the order book had already been closed because he considered the company's valuation by investors to be unfairly low.

The decision turned out to be correct in many respects, since just a few days after the cancellation of the IPO, a major accident occurred at one of Uralkali's mines. Uralkali's IPO finally went ahead in 2007, making it one of the most successful in the history of Russian business. For 14.38% of shares, Uralkali raised almost $1 billion, with demand for shares exceeding supply by 23 times. The listing attracted major international investors due to the company's strong financial results and proved to be a pivot point for the traditionally closed-off Russian chemical industry, setting new standards for corporate governance transparency.

In June 2010, Rybolovlev sold a 53% shareholding in Uralkali to a group of Russian investors: Kaliha Finance Limited (Suleyman Kerimov, 25%), Aerellia Investments Limited (Alexander Nesis, 15%) and Becounioco Holdings Limited (Filaret Galchev, 13.2%). The transaction price was not disclosed but was reported to be around $5.3 billion.

In December 2010, Uralkali bought a 20% stake in Silvinit for $1.4 billion from Rybolovlev. The merger was finalized in July 2011, after Rybolovlev had sold the remaining shares of Uralkali. After he had sold his stakes in 2010, Rybolovlev left Russia to permanently relocate to Monaco.

==== Berezniki mine collapse ====
In October 2006, a freshwater spring began flowing into one of Uralkali's mines under the city of Berezniki, leading the walls and pillars supporting the ceilings of large caverns to dissolve. There were attempts to keep the mine operable, but Rybolovlev decided to close it to avoid fatalities. As a result, mining equipment worth tens of millions of dollars and unexploited reserves of potash ore remained underground, but human casualties were avoided.

As a result of the mine's collapse, large sinkholes appeared around the mine and in the city of Berezniki, forcing some 12,000 residents to evacuate their homes. New sinkholes continue to appear regularly throughout the Perm region though it is not clear whether all of them are caused by mining activities. The causes of the accident were investigated by commissions of Rostekhnadzor, the Ministry of Emergencies, and the Ministry of Natural Resources. The investigation concluded that the accident occurred for geological reasons, specifically a "previously unknown anomaly of geological structure".

Then-head of the Ministry of Emergency Situations, Sergei Shoygu, said "the situation that we have today has been accumulating for decades. There are mistakes, including wartime, when very active and, perhaps, not very cautious works were performed".

The neutrality of the commission's report has been challenged by some observers, who argued that the report was partly written by OAO Galurgia, a company affiliated with Uralkali. Some Russian sources claimed that Uralkali failed to undertake all the necessary work in order to fill the holes in the mines, which may have directly caused the appearance of the sinkholes. Uralkali repeatedly denied the allegations, with Russian economic newspaper Kommersant reporting that the company's experts carried out the backfilling of the mines based on the technical projects and mining operations plans in the volumes necessary to ensure the safety of existing mines. When Rybolovlev became a shareholder in Uralkali, the company began to actively engage in backfilling the voids inherited from the Soviet era. More than 70% of the funding was provided by Uralkali, the rest came from the federal budget. A report in The New York Times suggested that the situation was partially caused by the fact that Berezniki began as a Soviet labor camp, and was built directly over the mine to be within marching distance of work areas.

Alleged state asset grab

In October 2008, Russian Vice Premier Igor Sechin reopened the investigation, prompting speculation in international news outlets, including The New York Times, that a raider attack had been launched against Uralkali. The results of this investigation turned out to be almost identical to the conclusion of the first investigation, namely that the cause of the accident was a combination of geological and technological factors.

Industry analysts at the time considered the re-opening of the investigation "an opportunistic move to gain a foothold in that industry or take some assets", where individuals close to the top echelons of government had sought to expand into the natural resources sector, in line with Putin's view that "Russia made a colossal error in the 1990s by allowing its enormous reserves of oil, gas and other natural resources to fall into private hands."

In December 2008, Uralkali pledged to pay $218 million to the Russian government as compensation for costs incurred by the mine collapse. In February 2009, the company agreed to a payment of $71.8 million to the Perm region.

=== Investment in the Bank of Cyprus ===
In September 2010, Rybolovlev bought a 9.7% stake in Cyprus's largest bank, the Bank of Cyprus. Rybolovlev's investment in Bank of Cyprus followed significant financial dealings in the country. Following the country's deep recession, on 25 March 2013 the Eurogroup agreed with the government of Cyprus that the Bank of Cyprus would take over the remnants of Laiki Bank. To finance the deal and save the Bank of Cyprus from bankruptcy, it was also decided that accounts over €100,000 would suffer a haircut on their assets of about 50%, which mostly wiped out Rybolovlev's stake and ended his involvement in the Bank with a $600 million loss. In 2012, he acquired Cypriot citizenship upon becoming an investor in the Bank of Cyprus.

=== AS Monaco ===
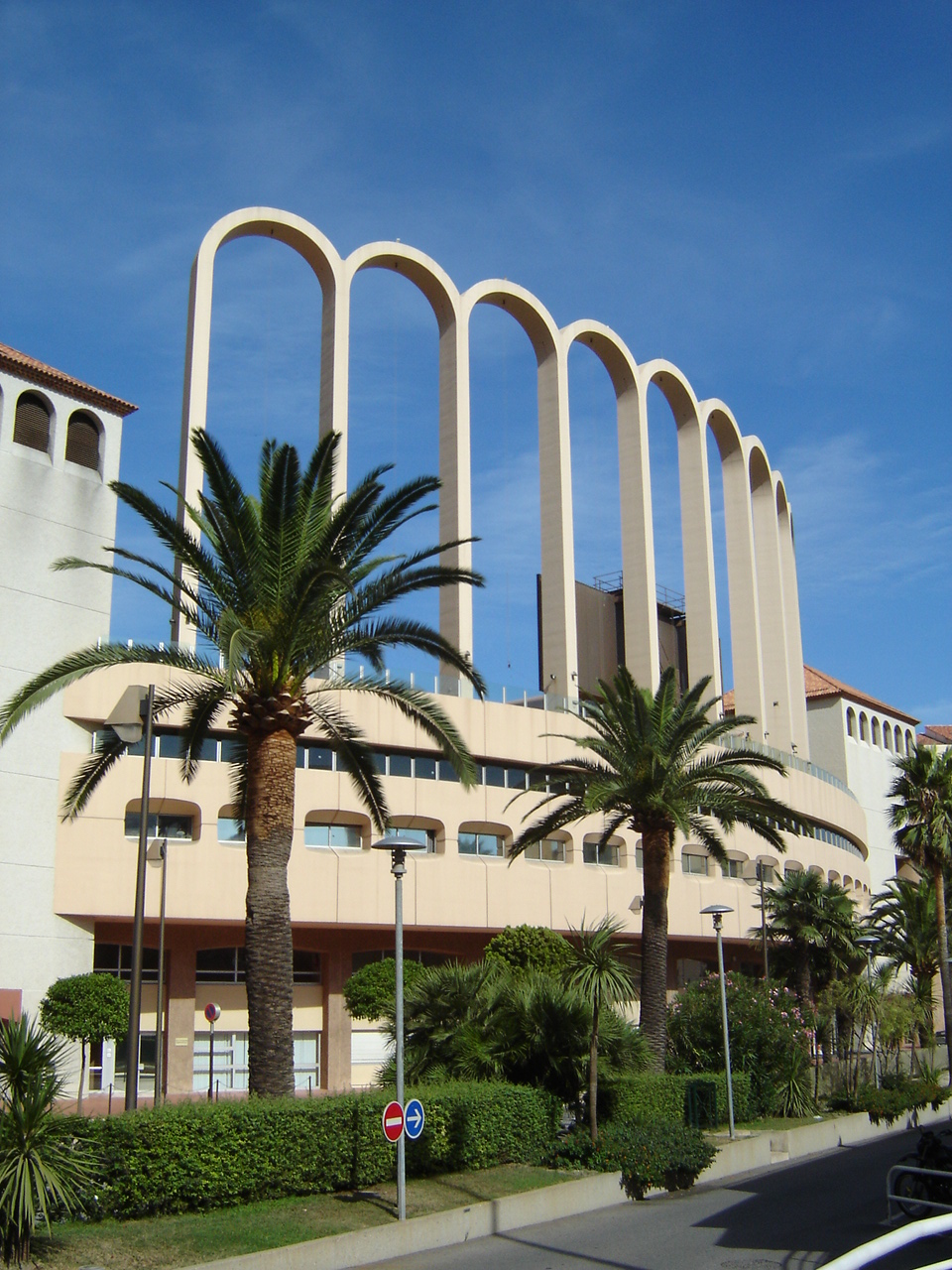
The nine arches of the Stade Louis II in Fontvieille.

Rybolovlev relocated to Monaco in 2010 and in December 2011, a trust acting on behalf of Rybolovlev's daughter Ekaterina bought a 66% stake in the Monegasque association football club Monaco. The club was in a bad state at the time, playing at the bottom of the French second league and highly in debt, and Monaco Palace was looking for an investor to improve the club's prospects. According to French media reports, Rybolovlev acquired the club for a symbolic €1, but with a commitment to invest at least €100 million ($129.4 million) into the club over the next four years.

The remaining 33% stake in the club is owned by Monaco's ruling family, the House of Grimaldi, with Rybolovlev's acquisition of the stake in the club approved by Prince Albert II of Monaco. Rybolovlev was subsequently appointed president of the club.

Though historically Monaco is one of France's most successful clubs, they were struggling at the time of Rybolovlev's arrival, and had been relegated to the second tier of French football, Ligue 2. Étienne Franzi, Monaco's former president, and the DNCG, the French football authority, both gave positive assessments of the club's progress after Rybolovlev's first year of ownership in December 2012.

In May 2013, Monaco was promoted to Ligue 1 after securing the second-division title. Monaco became one of the most prodigious spenders in European football in the summer of 2013 under Rybolovlev's presidency, spending £146 million on players including Radamel Falcao, James Rodríguez and João Moutinho. Ricardo Carvalho and Eric Abidal were also signed on free transfers with large salaries.

Rodríguez and Falcao subsequently left Monaco in the summer of 2014, the latter leaving on loan to Manchester United and Chelsea (returning to Monaco in 2016) and the former being sold to Real Madrid for almost double the transfer fee Monaco had paid Porto for his services one year prior. The transfers were explained by Monaco's vice president Vadim Vasilyev as part of a new strategy. He stated "There are two ways to go... One is either you invest a lot of money and do it quickly, the other is you build up an intelligent project and you have to base yourself on your academy and sound principles of working and scouting well and basically that's what we've decided to do."

In January 2014, Monaco agreed to pay the governing body of French football, the Ligue de Football Professionnel (LFP), a one-off voluntary payment of €50 million to remain exempt from a ruling by the LFP that its clubs must have their head offices located in France. Based in the tax haven of Monaco, the club managed to avoid the effects of tax increases in neighboring France. Rybolovlev and the head of the French league, Noël Le Graët, had initially failed to find an agreement over the matter and Rybolovlev had initiated legal action against the league which was later dropped. The €50 million figure was calculated by the league as the amount saved by Monaco as a result of their unique location. In July 2015, The State Council, France's highest court for administrative matters, announced that the agreement between the LFP and Monaco should be annulled, therefore AS Monaco no longer had to pay €50 million and had no obligation to move its headquarters out of the Principality.

The departure of star players and a decline in spending was also attributed by Vasilyev to the introduction of the UEFA Financial Fair Play Regulations and the resultant threat of sanctions. In an interview, Vasilyev dismissed claims that the Russian management were selling Monaco's best assets before leaving and stated that Rybolovlev remained "strongly committed" to the club. In a March 2015 interview with Nice Matin, Rybolovlev reiterated that his plans for the club are long-term.

In 2017, Monaco enjoyed its most successful season yet, winning the French Ligue 1 title and reaching the semi-final of the European Champions League. Reflecting on the club's unexpected success, The Independent wrote that "Monaco's policy of buying low and selling high has made the club a true Champion's League power at last" and called Monaco "one of the best-run clubs in Europe". In an interview to Nice Matin in May 2018, Prince Albert II thanked Rybolovlev "for all his action in the management of the ASM".

In July 2018, media reported that Rybolovlev was a potential buyer of Chinese businessman Li Yonghong's stake in AC Milan, but the deal didn't materialize.

Following an unsuccessful start to the 2018–2019 season, the club in October 2018 officially announced the departure of its head coach, Leonardo Jardim. On 13 October, the club confirmed Thierry Henry as the new head coach until 2021. On 25 January, Henry was sacked after only 20 matches, of which only five ended in victory. He was replaced by his predecessor Jardim. In December 2019 the former Spain national team manager Robert Moreno was appointed as AS Monaco's head coach. In July 2020, former Bayern Munich coach Niko Kovac became Monaco's new coach, replacing Robert Moreno.

On 16 January 2019, Monaco announced a €55 million investment into a new "Centre for sporting excellence", a multifunctional sports complex, that was planned to include three football fields in addition to a fitness and medical centre, and a rehabilitation zone. It was announced that the investment will also include renovations on the Louis II stadium and the construction of a dormitory for the club's youth academy. In the summer of 2020, a new building of the Monaco football academy opened, and in March 2021 Monaco officially received the keys to its new performance centre in La Turbie. The works were scheduled to be fully completed by summer 2022.

Since the arrival of Rybolovlev in 2011, Monaco had six podiums in Ligue 1, one French Cup final, two French League Cup finals, and UEFA Champions League's semi-finals. In an interview to RMC radio in October 2021, Prince Albert II approved of the club's decision-making and assured that he has confidence in the management of the club's owner, Rybolovlev.

Following the 2022 Russian invasion of Ukraine, France's football league stated that no sanctions were announced against Monaco and its players. Rybolovlev is not subject to EU, Monegasque or US sanctions.

In November 2022, Rybolovlev joined the board of directors for the Ligue de Football Professionnel (LFP), which oversees two prominent football leagues in France.

=== Apple Tree Partners ===
In 2012, the family trust of Dmitry Rybolovlev partnered with an American venture capitalist Seth Harrison, and his firm Apple Tree Partners (ATP), to establish a life sciences investment fund. Since its foundation, the fund has supported many US startup pharmaceutical developers working on promising drugs for serious illnesses. The Rybolovlev family trust, through its legal entities has contributed roughly 99% of the total $2.7 billion invested into the fund.

In 2025, the Rybolovlev family trust structures filed a petition in the Cayman Islands, where ATP Life Science Ventures is registered, seeking the fund’s winding up and alleging mismanagement by its general partner, Seth Harrison. The petition cited concerns such as alleged excessive travel expenses charged to the fund and alleged pressure to finance investments the trust considered non-viable. This action followed a lawsuit initiated by Apple Tree Partners (ATP) in the Court of Chancery in Delaware, in which ATP requested that the court compel the Rybolovlev trust to resume funding certain portfolio companies, warning of potential bankruptcies without additional capital. ATP said that Rybolovlev’s family trust, Rigmora, was unlawfully turning off funding for several important companies in ATP’s portfolio. In its subsequent court filings, the family trust stated that it had met all of its contractual obligations and described some of the fund’s investments as "hopeless". As of July 2025, the fund was valued at approximately $4 billion. The Delaware Court of Chancery issued a post-trial opinion on 5 December 2025 that orders specific performance of all but one of the capital calls and states that "there is no factual basis to question ATP’s good faith."

In April 2026, Rybolovlev scored a procedural win in the Delaware court which found that Rigmora had established sufficient grounds to proceed with its claim in the Cayman Islands seeking the liquidation of the ATP Life Science Ventures partnership and removal of the general partner from the management of the biotechnology fund.

In July 2026, the Grand Court of the Cayman Islands ordered Apple Tree Partners led by Seth Harrison to relinquish control of the fund with immediate effect. Two employees of the consulting firm Alvarez & Marsal were appointed to oversee the partnership. The decision to hand over control of the fund to “independent office holders is in the best interest of fund and its limited partners and will result in maximization of the fund’s value,” a family trust associated with Dmitry Rybolovlev said.

Later the same month, US Bankruptcy Judge Laurie Selber Silverstein ruled that two employees of Alvarez & Marsal should oversee the Chapter 11 case of Apple Tree Partners and consider what is best for creditors as well as the owners of the fund. The decision strengthened Rybolovlev’s position in the ongoing legal dispute with his former business partner.

== Controversies ==
=== Pollution of Kama River ===
In June 2012, Green Patrol, a Russian environmental NGO, listed Uralkali as one of the top 100 polluters in Russia, based on information gathered during the previous years. An expedition organized into the Perm Krai by the same NGO in 2010, when Rybolovlev was still the company's owner, revealed that Uralkali's sinks contained at least 16 harmful elements (including zinc and ammonium), exceeding the maximum permissible levels by 1,850 times.

According to Green Patrol's president, Roman Pukalov, Uralkali failed to fully disclose a complete list of harmful elements that it routinely ejected into the local river Kama. He described Kama water as "very polluted", declaring that small rivers around Berezniki had in fact turned into brine. Furthermore, Uralkali's environmental spending under Rybolovlev was exceptionally low.

=== Panama Papers scandal ===
In April 2016, it was alleged by the International Consortium of Investigative Journalists (ICIJ) that Rybolovlev used a company registered in the Virgin Islands to hide art from his former wife Elena during their divorce proceeding. Rybolovlev's use of offshore companies was described as a "textbook example of the lengths rich people go to protect their considerable wealth in case of a marital breakup" by the Süddeutsche Zeitung. Rybolovlev and his attorneys gave statements to media reports claiming the offshore structures established by the Rybolovlev family trust pre-dated the divorce proceedings by several years (but according to Mossack Fonseca's leaked records the items at issue were moved out of Switzerland into London and Singapore which were out of his wife's reach using the Xitrans Finance Ltd owned by Family trust that only Dmitry and not his wife had access to ensuring the assets in it were not available to her in the divorce. This took place as the marriage was breaking down in 2009 just prior to the divorce according to Panama Papers reports, emails to Mossack Fonseca found in court records).

=== Liberation of Georgi Bedjamov ===
Georgi Bedjamov, President of the Federation of Bobsleigh and Skeleton of Russia and former co-owner of Vneshprombank, was arrested in March 2016 in Monaco, after an international arrest warrant was issued against him by the Russian authorities on charges of fraudulent bankruptcy and embezzlement. Bedjamov was liberated in July 2016 by the Prince, a decision that was later confirmed by the Monaco Appeal Court. Russian sources alleged that Rybolovlev helped Georgi Bedjamov escape Russian authorities, but Rybolovlev denied these claims in an interview to the French newspaper Le Parisien in late October 2016.

=== Football Leaks scandal ===
In December 2016, the Football Leaks scandal revealed that Rybolovlev and football agent Jorge Mendes had set up a secret system to illegally buy players' shares. Using a Cyprus-based offshore investment fund named Browsefish Limited, Rybolovlev manipulated the price of his own players through third-party ownerships (TPO). Rybolovlev resorted to the use of offshore companies to hide his identity, as TPOs are illegal in Europe. Investigations revealed for example that football player Fabinho was already 48.5% owned by Rybolovlev when he was loaned to Monaco by Rio Ave.

AS Monaco denied these allegations and that such a scheme was ever put into place, arguing that reports published in the French and European press to the contrary "contain false information and many inaccuracies".

=== False allegations of participation in February 2025 United States-Russia Summit in Saudi Arabia ===
On 18 February, 2025, media reports claimed that Dmitry Rybolovlev was allegedly present at the 2025 Saudi Arabia Summit in Riyadh. However, this information was refuted by independent investigators and Rybolovlev's representatives.

== Personal life ==
Dmitry and Elena Rybolovlev wed in 1987 in Perm, Russia. They met in medical school. They have two daughters, including Ekaterina. In 2015, Ekaterina married Uruguayan businessman Juan Sartori who is an owner of a 20% stake in England's Sunderland.

=== Divorce ===
Elena Rybolovleva filed for divorce on 22 December 2008, citing in her divorce petition the "serial infidelity" of her husband. On the same occasion, Elena officially asked the Geneva State prosecutor for protection of her assets from Rybolovlev.

In February 2014, Elena was detained in Cyprus for allegedly stealing a $28 million diamond ring she later proved her ex-husband had given her while they were still married.

In May of that year, a Geneva court awarded Elena a record settlement of $4.8 billion. This would have been the most expensive divorce settlement in history at the time. However, Rybolovlev's lawyers successfully appealed the 2014 ruling in June 2015. The Geneva court reversed the earlier decision, ruling that Elena's settlement be reduced to 564 million Swiss francs.

Finally, in October 2015, Rybolovlev and Elena announced they had reached an amicable settlement of their divorce, and that all legal actions in relation to the case would cease. Financial terms of the settlement were not disclosed.

=== Wealth ===
In the Forbes Billionaires list for 2021, Rybolovlev was ranked the 391st richest person in the world with a net worth of $6.7 billion.

Indicator	2006	2007	2008	2009	2010	2011	2012	2013	2014	2015	2016	2017	2018	2019	2020	2021
Net worth ($ billion)	1.6	3.3	12.8	3.1	8.6	9.5	9	9.1	8.8	8.5	7.7	7.3	6.8	6.6	6.6	6.7
Rank (in the world)	486	271	59	196	79	93	100	119	147	156	170	190	242	224	224	391
Rank (in Russia)	32	29	11	13	10	14	13	14	17	14	12	15	18	17	17	26

He owns an Airbus.

He is the owner of €80 million superyacht Anna I, which was sold in 2021, and his new $250 million yacht, also called Anna. Both yachts were built by Feadship and designed by Michael Leach, with Anna being the company's biggest superyacht to date.

In July 2021, Rybolovlev acquired a new sailing ClubSwan 125 yacht, named Skorpios after the Greek island owned by his family trusts. The 43-meter racing vessel took four years to build at Nautor's Swan yard in Finland. The yacht was designed to be a record-breaker and is able to reach a speed of roughly 15 knots upwind and remain consistently faster than the wind speed downwind thanks to innovations including the addition of a single curved foil that provides sideways and vertical lift in varying conditions. Skorpios' skipper is Olympic gold medalist and two-world champion Fernando Echávarri, while Rybolovlev is the racing yacht's helmsman.

Rybolovlev also owns a racing yacht of the ClubSwan 50 model, now renamed Sparti. With this model, he won the ClubSwan 50 World Championship title during The Nations Trophy regatta in Palma Bay, Spain in October 2019. In the event's 2020 reiteration, Rybolovlev's ClubSwan 50 yacht took third place overall after winning two of that year's four races, making it the only team to win medals in the ClubSwan World Championship over two consecutive years.

==== Property ====
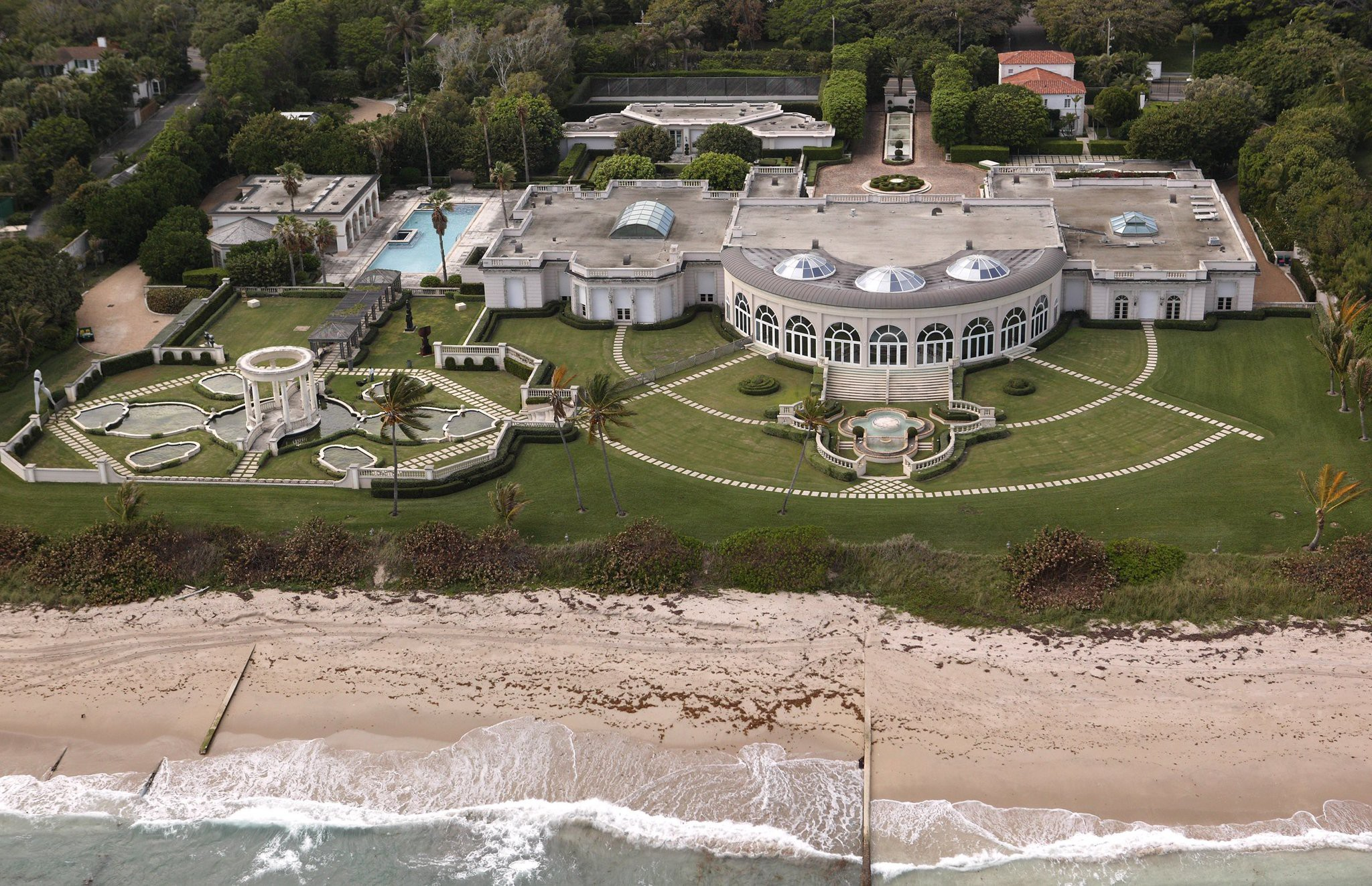
The Maison de L'Amitié in Palm Beach, Florida

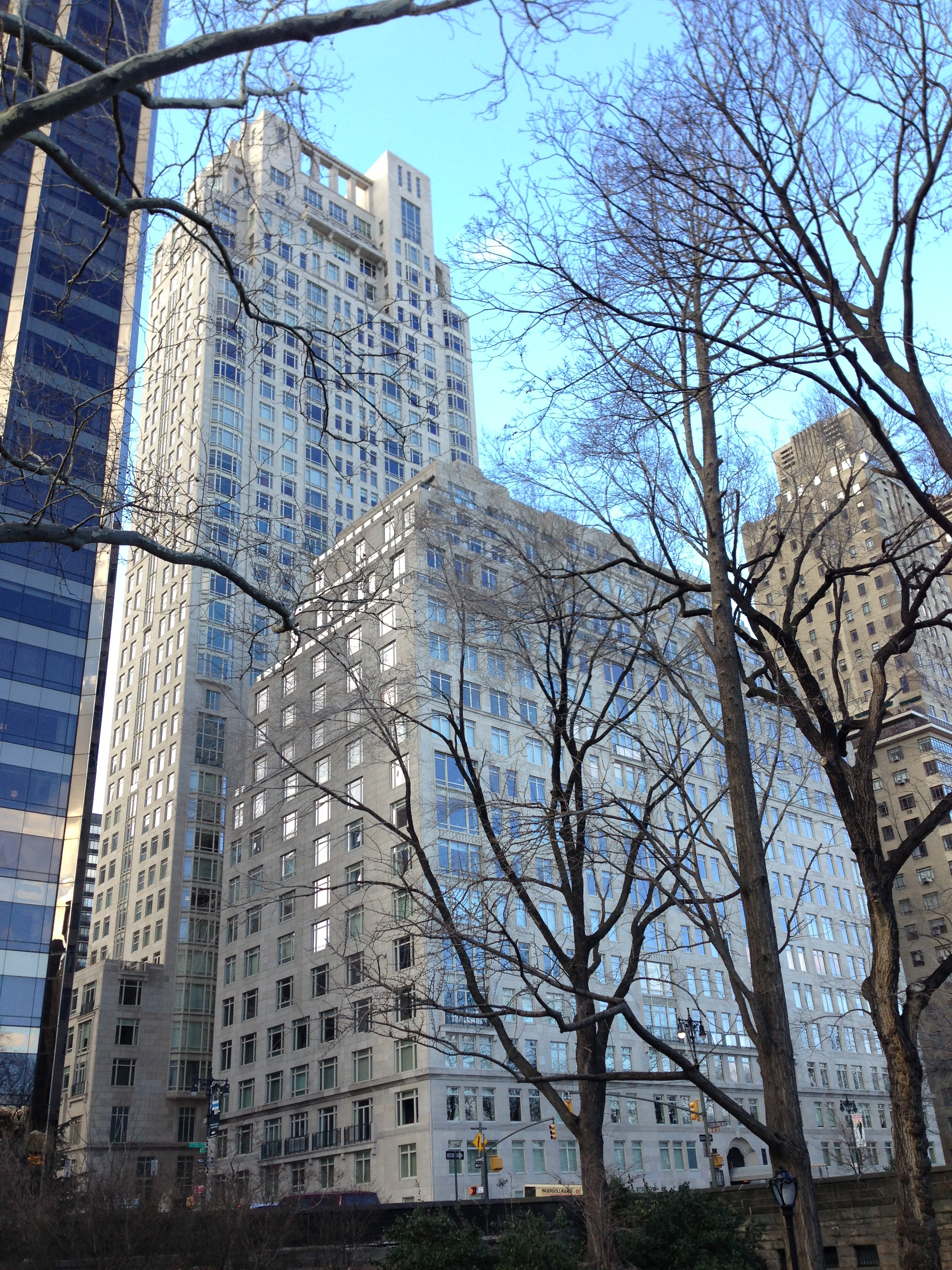
15 Central Park West as viewed from Central Park in 2013

Trusts in the name of Rybolovlev's daughter, Ekaterina, have made several significant property purchases around the world since 2008. The trusts have bought properties in Florida, Hawaii, New York City, Monaco, as well as two islands in Greece. Rybolovlev also owns an estate in Saint-Tropez on the Cote d'Azur in the south of France, houses in Gstaad, Switzerland, and used to own property in Geneva and Paris with his former wife. In 2013, the property purchases were contested by Rybolovlev's estranged wife, Elena, during the couple's divorce proceedings.

==== United States ====
The New York Times reported that in 2008, Rybolovlev and his wife made house-hunting trips to New York City and aimed to buy their first property in the US, eyeing an apartment at 15 Central Park West, but the seller eventually withdrew from the deal. Rybolovlev subsequently looked to Florida, where American businessman Donald Trump was selling a 6-acre Palm Beach residence on the coast of the Atlantic Ocean.

In 2008, Ekaterina Rybolovleva's trust bought the Maison de L'Amitie in Palm Beach, Florida, from the American businessman Donald Trump for US$95 million. Trump had acquired the property in 2004 for about US$40 million, but shortly after put it on sale. The initial asking price in 2006 was US$125 million. By 2008, right before the sale was concluded, it was being offered for about US$100 million. Rybolovlev claimed he had purchased the property as an investment for his family and wanted to demolish the house. However, following the purchase, the property became involved in divorce proceedings and was subject to legal restrictions, which delayed any redevelopment for several years.

After Trump first became President of the United States, numerous media outlets speculated about the role of the sale of Maison de l'Amitié in the context of alleged Russian influence on the outcome of the 2016 election. However, investigations did not produce any evidence of illegality or political motivation in connection with the transaction.

In 2016, Rybolovlev razed the mansion on the property after being granted permission to subdivide the land into three lots, two of which have since sold for a combined $71.34 million. The third lot of 2.23 acres was sold in July 2019 for $37.3 million. Although the property's price was originally listed at $42 million, all three lots were sold for a total of $108.2 million, roughly $13 million more than what Rybolovlev had paid for the property in 2008.

In December 2011, the trust bought a ten-room, 626 m^{2} (6,740 sq ft) apartment at 15 Central Park West in New York City for $88 million, from Joan Weill, the wife of Sanford I. Weill, the former chairman of Citigroup. This was a record price for an apartment in the city at the time of its purchase.

In 2011, Rybolovlev also bought a $20 million property in Kauai, Hawaii, from the American actor Will Smith. During his ownership, 21 acres were added to the estate, and put on the market for $29.5 million in 2015.

==== Greece ====
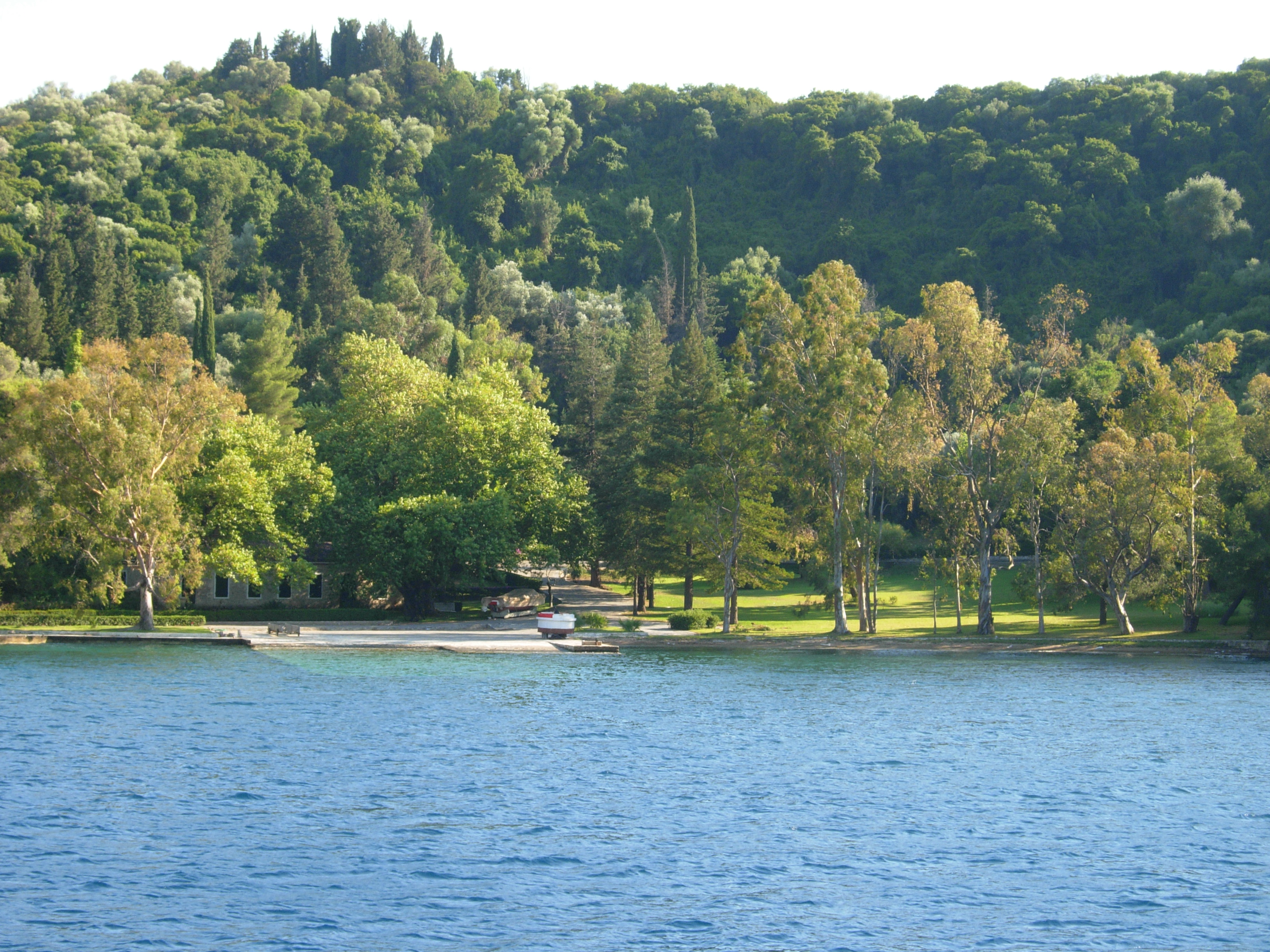
The shore of the island of Skorpios in July 2007

In April 2013, Ekaterina Rybolovlev's trust bought a group of companies from the Greek heiress Athina Onassis Roussel. The assets included the 74-acre Greek island of Skorpios and its smaller islet, Sparti. The sale price was reported as $154 million. In October 2018, Dmitry Rybolovlev started a major development project on the island with the aim of transforming it into a luxury resort. The total investment in the project amounts to €184 million. The work was supposed to end in 2020. At the beginning of 2021, the completion date was shifted to 2024. The investment in the resort was estimated at €165 million, and the weekly rental price was estimated at €1 million.

On 8 November 2021, the Co-Ordination Authority of the Peloponnese, Western Sterea Hellas, and Ionian Islands prefecture, after a petition was submitted by a number of inhabitants of nearby Lefkada island, annulled a permit allowing enlargement works on the Skorpios small port. Representatives of the Rybolovlev investment company declared that they would appeal the decision.

==== Monaco ====
In 2010, Rybolovlev bought a 2,000 m^{2} Belle Époque style penthouse apartment on the Avenue d'Ostende in the Monte Carlo district of Monaco. The property was bought for €220 million. Its previous owners include Christian and Nick Candy, British brothers behind the Candy & Candy interior design and property development business, and earlier, Brazilian banker Edmond Safra, who died in a fire at the apartment in 1999.

==== Switzerland ====
Rybolovlev and his former wife owned a property in Geneva, Switzerland, which they demolished in 2008 and planned to replace with a replica of the palace of Marie-Antoinette, the Petit Trianon at the Palace of Versailles. The project was abandoned amidst the couple's divorce proceedings. Rybolovlev has also built two houses worth $135 million in the Swiss alpine resort of Gstaad.

==== Art collection ====
Rybolovlev's art collection has included paintings by Paul Gauguin, Auguste Rodin, Amedeo Modigliani, Pablo Picasso, Henri Matisse, Claude Monet, Mark Rothko, and Vincent van Gogh. He was also the owner of Salvator Mundi by Leonardo da Vinci, or studio, until it was sold at Christie's auction house for a record-breaking $450 million on 15 November 2017.

In 2012, he acquired the 1907 painting Water Serpents II by Austrian artist Gustav Klimt for $112 million.

==== The Bouvier Affair ====
In early 2015, it was reported that Rybolovlev may have been a victim of a complex art fraud to the tune of $1 billion allegedly perpetrated by the art dealer Yves Bouvier, who was indicted on charges of fraud and complicity in money laundering. In 2015, Rybolovlev was again at the center of a controversy after it was alleged that he bought two stolen Picassos from art dealer Olivier Thomas through the mediation of Yves Bouvier. In September 2015 he returned the paintings, valued at $30 million, to the artist's stepdaughter. In October 2018, Rybolovlev launched a lawsuit against Sotheby's in Manhattan federal court, alleging that the auction house "materially assisted the largest art fraud in history". Rybolovlev's lawyers said "Sotheby's was the willing auction house that knowingly and intentionally made the fraud possible" because it knew how much Bouvier paid the sellers. Sotheby's has denied these allegations.

On 6 November 2018, Rybolovlev was questioned by the Monegasque police. His lawyers stated that this happened on the basis of information obtained from the phone of one of Rybolovlev's previous lawyers Tatiana Bersheda, which is the subject of an appeal in Monaco. Rybolovlev was subsequently named a "formal suspect" in a graft investigation by Monaco's chief prosecutor. He was released from custody and placed under judicial control.

In an interview with the Nice Matin in December 2018, Rybolovlev's lawyer, Me Hervé Temime, criticised repeated violations of the investigation's secrecy that he attributed to vested interests against Rybolovlev. He also stated that "the seriousness of the initial scam" was understated "because of the wealth" of Rybolovlev in what he described as an ostracism of rich Russians.

In June 2019, Sotheby's request to have the case against it thrown out was denied by a US federal court in Manhattan. The court argued that Sotheby's had failed to establish "exceptional circumstances" to justify such a move. The auction house also had to allow public access to previously sealed or redacted documents detailing correspondence between Yves Bouvier, Sotheby's staff as well as Sotheby's senior director and vice-chairman for private sales Samuel Valette. According to the Art Newspaper, the correspondence reveals "that Bouvier paid Sotheby's $83 million for Salvator Mundi, suggesting a 53.62% markup on the painting, as Rybolovlev had alleged". Next to Salvator Mundi, the documents pertain to pricing negotiations between Bouvier and Sotheby's for Gustav Klimt's Wasserschlangen II in 2012, Picasso's L'Homme Assis Au Verre and Modigliani's Nu Couché au Coussin Bleu.

In July 2020, criminal proceedings against Bouvier for fraud and money laundering were dismissed by Monaco's Court of Revision on the procedural grounds that "the investigations had been conducted in a biased and unfair manner". In January 2021, Swiss prosecutors closed a two-year-long investigation into Bouvier. Rybolovlev appealed the prosecutor's decision. As of February 2021, litigation between Rybolovlev and Bouvier is still ongoing in a number of jurisdictions, including the US, London and Paris. After the Swiss prosecutor closed the investigation, Rybolovlev's lawyers filed an appeal claiming the case was "one of the most serious the art world has ever known, be duly considered and finally judged on its merits".

In September 2021, Rybolovlev filed a case with the European Court of Human Rights (ECHR) against the Department of Justice of Monaco in a case of attorney-client privilege violation within the Bouvier affair. During the investigation in Monaco, the judge seized the phone of Rybolovlev's lawyer in order to verify the authenticity of the records that were a part of the proceedings. However, he accessed all the information contained in the lawyer's smartphone. Rybolovlev and his lawyer contested this use of the telephone and alleged a violation of the attorney-client privilege.

In July 2022, the criminal court of appeal in Geneva nullified the previous dismissal of Rybolovlev's complaints against Bouvier, which had been pronounced by the prosecutor. The court's decision acknowledged that "the possible existence of deception cannot be denied." Furthermore, the Geneva court returned the case to the Geneva Prosecutor's Office for further investigation into Bouvier.

In March 2023, U.S. District Judge Jesse Furman decreed that Sotheby's must confront the lawsuit filed by Rybolovlev. The suit accuses the auction house of being complicit in the former art dealer's scam, which led to overcharging Rybolovlev for 15 pieces of art. The artworks in question are worth hundreds of millions of dollars and include works by Gustav Klimt, Rene Magritte, and Amedeo Modigliani, along with The Salvator Mundi, attributed to Leonardo da Vinci.

The accusations in the lawsuit revolve around fraud. The judge allowed the Salvator Mundi claims and referred to evidence that Sotheby's was aware that Bouvier had purchased the painting for Rybolovlev. Sotheby's client manager collaborated with Bouvier to "adjust its valuation" despite objections from Sotheby's own Old Masters specialist. The judge's ruling also confirms that Samuel Valette, a senior director and vice chairman of Sotheby's private sales worldwide for the Impressionist and Modern art department, "was aware of Bouvier's price manipulation and the essence of his scheme."

In November 2023, it was reported that Monaco investigating judges dismissed the case against Rybolovlev concerning his alleged complicity for invasion of privacy. A complaint against Rybolovlev as well as his lawyer Tetiana Bersheda and then-Monaco public prosecutor Jean-Pierre Dreno was filed back in 2015 by Tatia Rappo, a friend of both Rybolovlev and Bouvier. The case against Dreno was also dismissed in November 2023, whereas Bersheda was cleared of any wrongdoing by the Monaco court in March 2024.

In December 2023, it was reported that Rybolovlev and Bouvier reached an undisclosed settlement agreement. According to a statement by the Geneva prosecutor's office, the parties requested that the criminal proceedings not be pursued.

On 8 January 2024, Rybolovlev's lawsuit against Sotheby's began in Manhattan federal court lasting nearly four weeks. Rybolovlev personally testified in court through interpreters saying he fully relied on documents from Sotheby's when making art purchases through Bouvier, which eventually led him to overpay his art advisor up to $1 billion. Samuel Valette, Sotheby's senior vice president and head of private sales for EMEA, testified that the information in Bouvier's emails to Rybolovlev's aide to justify the price of artworks was “a complete fiction”.

On 30 January, the ten-member jury found that the auction house didn't aid in defrauding Rybolovlev by secretly and significantly marking up the prices of 4 artworks sold to the Russian collector. Rybolovlev's lawyer said, however, that the case “achieved our goal of shining a light on the lack of transparency that plagues the art market,” adding, “That secrecy made it difficult to prove a complex aiding and abetting fraud case. This verdict only highlights the need for reforms, which must be made outside the courtroom.”

On 6 June 2024, the ECHR issued a decision that confirmed the violation of Article 8 (right to respect for private life) of the European Convention on Human Rights of Rybolovlev’s lawyer, Tetiana Bersheda. The court ruled that during proceedings in Monaco, the judge “had extended the scope of his investigation too broadly and that the supervisory judicial authorities had failed to redefine the bounds of the expert’s assignment and of the investigation, in order to comply with the judge’s remit”. According to Rybolovlev’s attorney, Me Martin Reynaud, legal proceedings concerning corruption and influence peddling in Monaco could no longer continue as their basis was now considered illicitly obtained by Monegasque judiciary authorities.

In October 2024, Rybolovlev was cleared by Swiss authorities over his alleged role in the arrest of Yves Bouvier in Monaco in 2015. The Office of the Attorney General of Switzerland initiated criminal proceedings in 2017 and accused Rybolovlev of “performing illegally for a foreign state” by allegedly arranging for Bouvier to be apprehended by Monaco’s police. After a thorough investigation, the Swiss attorney general’s office concluded that no suspicion justifying an indictment had been established and closed the case.

In February 2025, the corruption and the influence-peddling case against Dmitry Rybolovlev was officially closed after Monaco’s judiciary ruled that the evidence presented was based on data unlawfully extracted from his lawyer's phone. The decision followed a ruling by the European Court of Human Rights (ECHR), which stated that Article 8 of the European Convention on Human Rights, concerning the right to privacy, had been violated. This effectively concluded the legal proceedings that had been ongoing since 2015. According to Rybolovlev's lawyers, there are no longer any criminal cases pending against him in any country in the world, and he is fully exonerated.

In January 2026, the documentary series The Oligarch and the Art Dealer, directed by Andreas Dalsgaard and focusing on the long-running legal dispute between Dmitry Rybolovlev and Yves Bouvier, premiered at the Sundance Film Festival. The series was subsequently presented at CPH:DOX in Copenhagen (Denmark), the Visions du Réel festival in Nyon (Switzerland), and in the Docuseries Competition section of Canneseries in Cannes (France). In June, the film was broadcast on the Arte television channel.

== Philanthropy ==
Rybolovlev provided financial assistance to the reconstruction of Saint Petersburg's Oranienbaum Palace, as well as to the restoration of the Conception Convent (also known as Zachatyevsky Monastery) in Moscow. He donated €17.5 million for the re-building of the Cathedral of Nativity of Theotokos in Moscow, and was involved in the restoration of several icon paintings in the Cathedral of Exaltation of the Cross recreated in Belogorsk Saint Nicolas Monastery. He donated funds for the construction of the Russian Orthodox Church of St Nicholas in Limassol, Cyprus.

In 2010, Rybolovlev was awarded the Order of St Seraphim of Sarov I degree by Patriarch Kirill for funding the restoration of the Cathedral of the Nativity of the Most Holy Mother of God in Zachatyevsky Convent.

In April 2020, Rybolovlev donated the amount of 80 million rubles (more than $1 million) through his "Financial house" investment company to the Perm Territory Charitable Foundation to fight the coronavirus.

In October 2020, Rybolovlev announced he would donate €250,000 to help rebuild the pitch of Saint-Martin-Vésubie, which was destroyed during Storm Alex. The donation follows a letter written by local 11-year-old twins to Rybolovlev asking for financial help for a stadium where ASM's academy spends a period of their pre-season every year.

In November 2021, Rybolovlev's family charitable foundation was founded in Lefkada (Greece) to support his philanthropic activities in the region.

In 2022, in the wake of Russia's invasion of Ukraine, it was announced by AS Monaco that the club and Rybolovlev, in a personal capacity, donated to the Monegasque Red Cross to support its efforts of delivering humanitarian aid to civilian victims of the conflict.

In April 2023, a new emergency department funded by Rybolovlev for €1.8 million opened at the Princess Grace Hospital Center. The facility combines the hospital's adult and pediatric emergency units in a single location.

== Hobbies ==
Rybolovlev's hobbies include sailing where his yachts named Skorpis race competitively winning the ClubSwan 50 World Championship and taking line honour in the 2021 Fastnet Race sailing his ClubSwan 125.

== See also ==
- List of Russian billionaires
- Links between Trump associates and Russian officials
