= Skorpios =

Greek island in the Ionian Sea

Native name: Σκορπιός
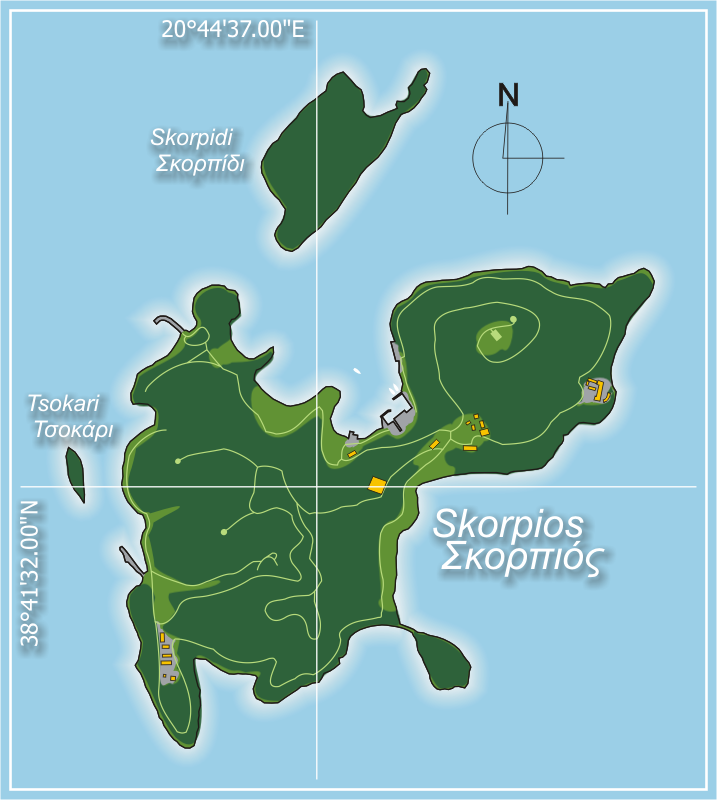

- Location within Greece

Geography
- Coordinates: 38°41′31″N 20°44′35″E
- Archipelago: Ionian Islands
- Area: 83.2 ha (206 acres)
- Highest elevation: 81 m (266 ft)

Administration
- Greece
- Region: Ionian Islands
- Regional unit: Lefkada

Demographics
- Population: 5 (2011)

Additional information
- Postal code: 311 00
- Area code: 26450

Skorpios or Scorpios (Greek: Σκορπιός, pronounced [skorˈpços]) is a private island in the Ionian Sea off the western coast of Greece and just to the east of the island of Lefkada. The 2011 census reported a population of five inhabitants. Administratively it is part of the municipality of Meganisi in Lefkada regional unit.

== Geography ==
The island, spanning 83.2 hectares (roughly 205 acres), is irregularly shaped, with main axes about 1,500 m (4,900 ft) and 1,000 m (3,300 ft). It is heavily forested from south to north and features over 200 varieties of trees imported to the once nearly barren island by Aristotle Onassis. There are some sandy beaches, most notably East Beach, which was created by Onassis, who brought sand from Salamis Island for this purpose. It is home to three residences, a helicopter landing pad and a boat quay. Onassis also built harbor facilities in the bay on the north side for his Christina O yacht.

== History ==
Skorpios is primarily known as the private island of the late Greek shipping billionaire Aristotle Onassis. It was bought in 1963 and believed to have cost him the equivalent of about €11,000 of today's money (2015). Numerous high profile parties were hosted during the time of Aristotle Onassis. Skorpios was also the site of his wedding to former United States First Lady Jacqueline Kennedy on October 20, 1968. In 1971, Jacqueline Kennedy Onassis was photographed nude by an Italian paparazzo on a Skorpios beach. Upon Onassis's death the island was passed to his daughter Christina, and then in turn to her daughter Athina Onassis, the only surviving heir. Onassis, his son Alexander, and his daughter Christina are all buried on the island.

== Rybolovlev long term lease ==
In April 2013, Ekaterina Rybolovleva, the 24-year-old daughter of Russian oligarch Dmitry Rybolovlev, bought a group of companies from Athina Onassis for $153 million from her trust. The assets included a long term lease to Skorpios and its smaller islet, Sparti. Beginning in October 2018 and with a completion date of 2020, Rybolovleva began developing a 10,000 square metres (110,000 sq ft) luxury resort on Skorpios for a total investment estimated at €184 million. The island is a Natura 2000 protected area with no more than 5% of its area to be developed.

The Greek government is yet to confirm the legality of the purchase. An investigation is underway, as Giannis Mihelakis (a New Democracy MP) raised the question in the Greek parliament. Specifically, Onassis stated in his will that the island would remain in the family as long as they could afford to cover its maintenance expenses. According to the will, if his descendants could not cover the expenses, the island would be donated either to the now defunct Olympic Airlines or to the state.

== Gallery ==
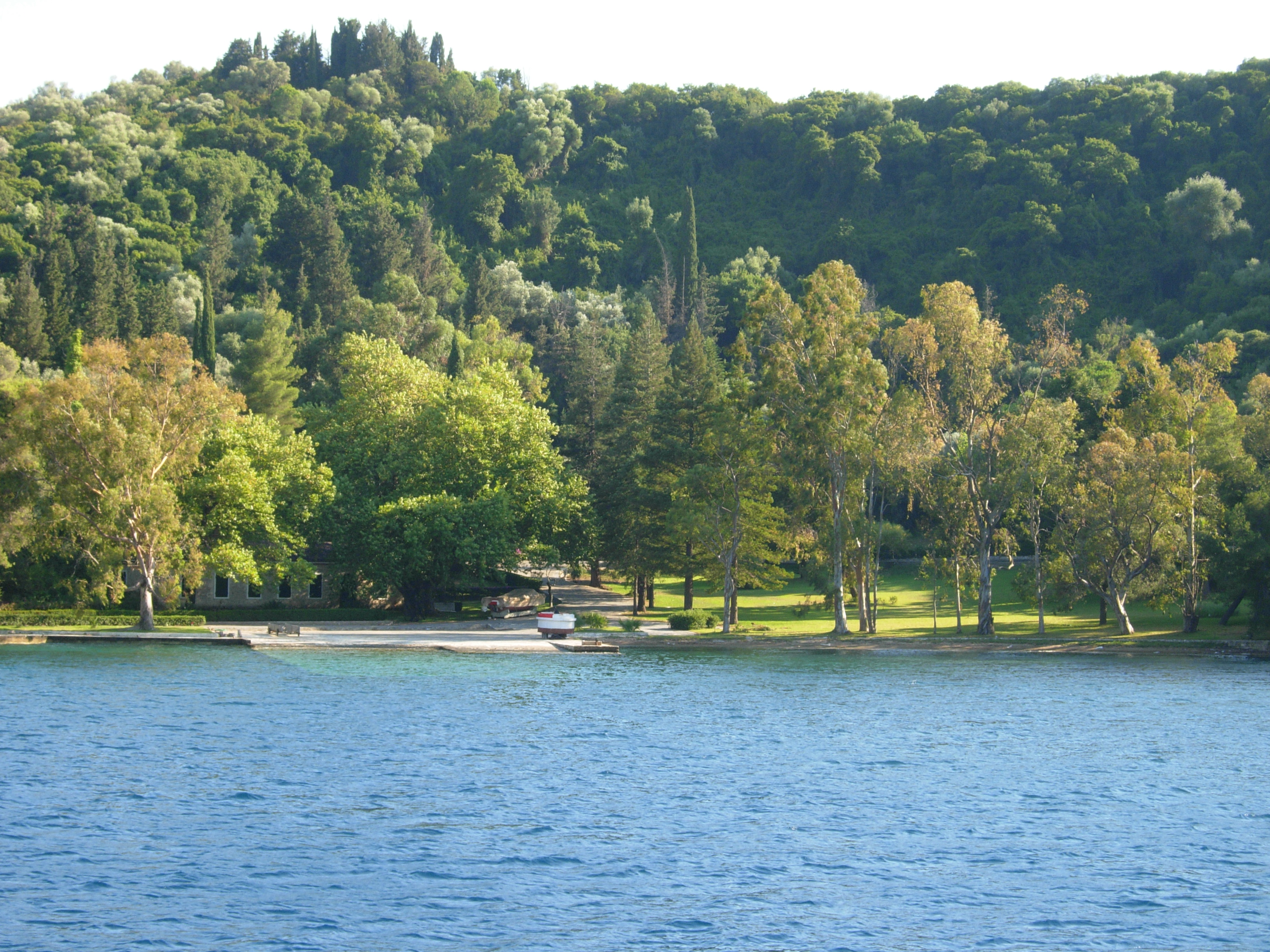
View of the island in July 2007

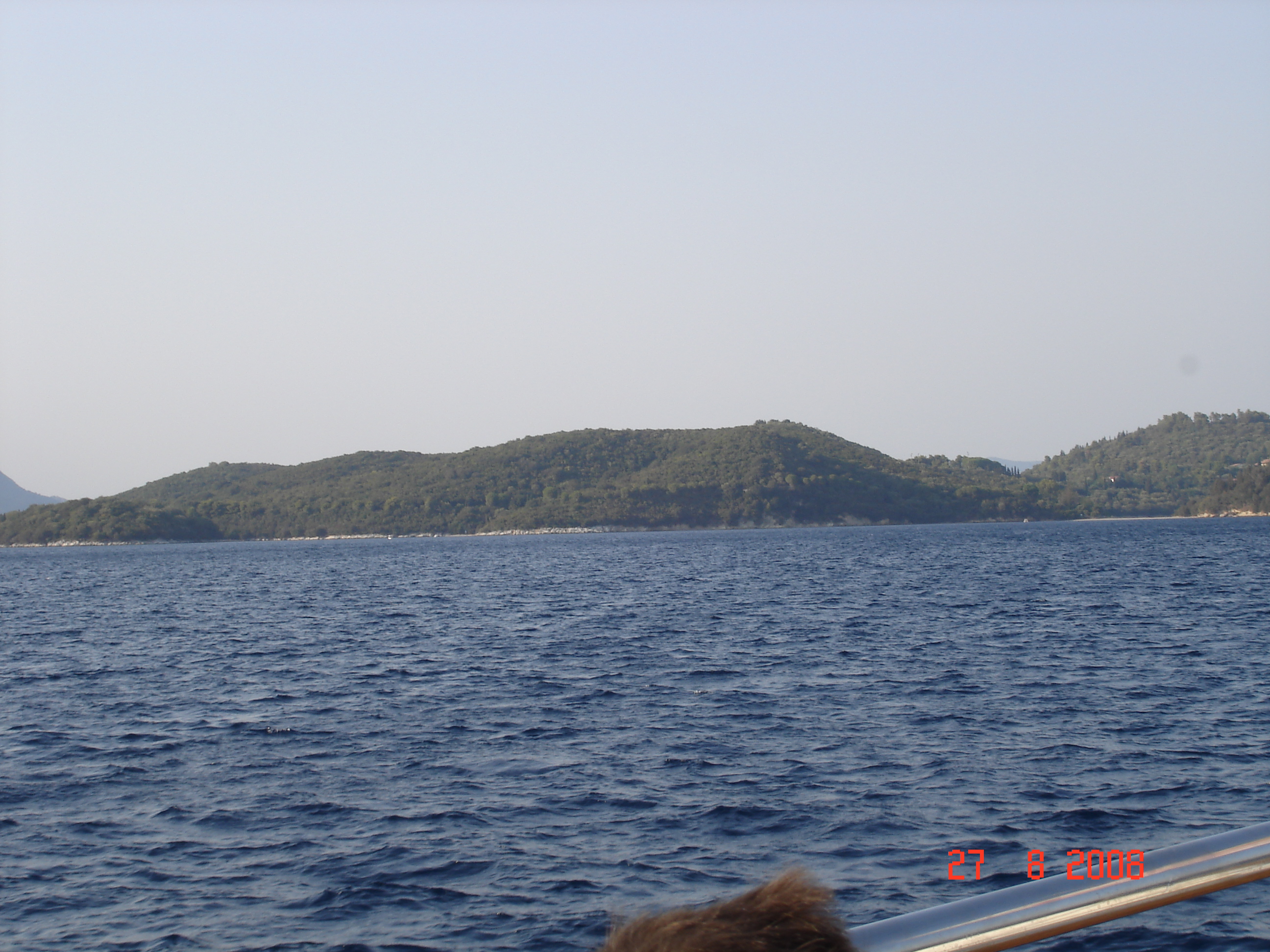
Skorpios island in 2008

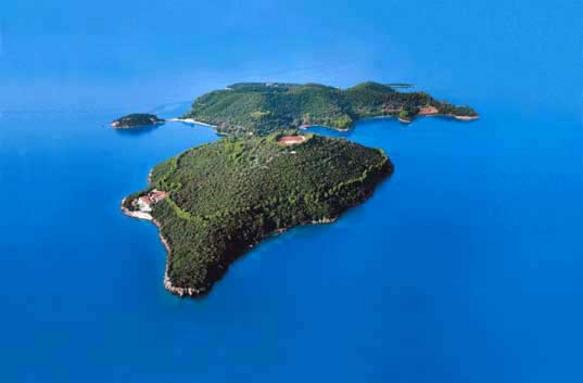
Skorpios island of the Ionian Islands, aerial view
