= Russian Pseudo-Gothic =

Gothic architectural style in Russia

Russian Pseudo-Gothic (Russian: Ру́сская неого́тика) or Russian Gothic (Russian: ру́сская го́тика) refers to a movement in the architecture and decorative & applied arts of Russia from the 18th to the beginning of the 20th century.

== "Russian Gothic": Romanticism Era ==
From 1804-1814, a new cathedral was built in the city of Mozhaisk, southwest of Moscow, in a romantic style, designed by architect A. N. Bakarev. The red background of the cathedral walls with white stone details reproduces the traditional Russian ornamentation of the late 17th century. The bell tower has a tiered, Old Russian look to it. At the same time, the building contains elements of classical and Gothic architecture. From 1805-1806, the Nikolskaya Tower of the Kremlin was completely rebuilt in the Gothic style by architect Luigi Rusca, in collaboration with Bakarev. From 1809-1817, also according to Bakarev, architect Carlo Rossi built the Church of St. Catherine of Alexandria of the Ascension Monastery in the Kremlin in 1808; it was demolished in 1932. The presence of neo-Gothic elements and buildings was meant to emphasize the medieval origin of the Kremlin itself, since Russian medieval architecture was also considered Gothic at the time, and Russian and Western European elements were often mixed.

== "Russian Gothic": Historicism and Eclecticism ==
In 1829, Berlin architect K. F. Schinkel, commissioned by Emperor Nicholas I, created a design for a church, also in the Gothic style. The building, on a dramatic elevation change in Alexandria Park, was erected between 1829 and 1832 by A. Menelaws and I. I. Charlemagne I, who had previously worked with Rossi. The Gothic chapel in Alexandria was built with a flat ceiling and octagonal towers at the corners. This structure is typical of English Gothic architecture.
