= List of centrist political parties =

The following is a list of centrist political parties. It includes centre, centre-right, and centre-left political parties.

== Active ==
=== A ===
Abkhazia

- Apsny
- Party for the Economic Development of Abkhazia
- People's Party of Abkhazia

Afghanistan

- Basej-e Milli
- National Congress Party of Afghanistan
- National Islamic Movement of Afghanistan
- Truth and Justice

Åland Islands

- Åland Centre
- Future of Åland
- Liberals for Åland

Albania

- Environmentalist Agrarian Party
- Liberal Democratic Union
- Libra Party
- Sfida për Shqipërinë
- Unity for Human Rights Party

Algeria

- Algerian National Party
- Democratic National Rally
- Future Front

Andorra

- Andorra for Change

Anguilla

- Anguilla Progressive Movement
- Anguilla United Front

Antigua and Barbuda

- United Progressive Party

Argentina

- Federal Consensus
  - Christian Democratic Party
  - Federal Party
- Juntos por el Cambio
  - Civic Coalition ARI
  - Democratic Progressive Party
  - Integration and Development Movement
  - Radical Civic Union
- Liberal Party of Corrientes
- Neighbourhood Action Movement
- Neuquén People's Movement
- Renewal Front (Frente de Todos)
- Salta Identity Party
- We Are All Chubut
- We Do for Córdoba

Armenia

- Apricot Country Party
- Armenian Constructive Party (Free Homeland Alliance)
- Armenian Liberal Party
- Armenian National Congress
- Civil Contract
- European Party of Armenia
- Free Democrats
- Hanrapetutyun Party
- Heritage
- National Democratic Union
- New Country
- New Times
- One Armenia Party (Armenia Alliance)
- ORO Alliance
- Shirinyan-Babajanyan Alliance of Democrats
- Social Justice Party
- Unified Armenians Party

Australia

- Advance SA
- Australian Democrats
- Australian Labor Party (factions)
  - Labor Right
- Australian Progressives
- Ban Fracking Fix Crime Protect Water
- Centre Alliance
- Health Australia Party
- Liberal Party of Australia (factions)
  - Moderates
- Reason Party
- Rex Patrick Team
- SA Best
- Science Party
- Sustainable Australia
- Western Australia Party

Austria

- NEOS – The New Austria and Liberal Forum
- Team Carinthia
- Volt Austria

Azerbaijan

- National Solidarity Party
- Republican Alternative Party
- Unity Party

=== B ===
Bahamas

- Progressive Liberal Party

Bangladesh

- Awami League (factions)
- Bangladesh Nationalist Party (factions)
- Bikalpa Dhara Bangladesh
- Liberal Democratic Party
- National Citizen Party
- Nationalist Democratic Movement

Belarus

- Republican Party
- Party of Freedom and Progress

Belgium

- Christlich Soziale Partei
- Les Engagés
- ProDG
- Walloon Rally
- Volt Belgium

Belize

- People's United Party

Benin

- Cowry Forces for an Emerging Benin

Bhutan

- People's Democratic Party

Bolivia

- Civic Community
- National Unity Front

Bonaire

- Bonaire Patriotic Union
- Bonaire People's Movement

Bosnia and Herzegovina

- Democratic Front
- Independent Bloc
- Movement of Democratic Action
- Our Party
- Party for Bosnia and Herzegovina
- People's European Union of Bosnia and Herzegovina
- People's Party Work for Prosperity

Botswana

- Alliance for Progressives
- Botswana Congress Party (Umbrella for Democratic Change)
- Botswana Democratic Party
- Botswana Movement for Democracy

Brazil

- Agir
- Avante
- Brazilian Democratic Movement
- Brazilian Social Democracy Party (Always Forward)
- Brazil Union
- Christian Democracy
- Cidadania (Always Forward)
- Green Party (Brazil of Hope)
- National Mobilization
- Podemos
- Progressistas
- Social Democratic Party
- Solidarity
- Sustainability Network (PSOL REDE Federation)

Bulgaria

- Bulgarian Summer
- Democratic Bulgaria
- Movement for Rights and Freedoms
- National Movement for Stability and Progress
- People's Voice
- Volt Bulgaria
- We Continue the Change

Burkina Faso

- Alliance for Democracy and Federation – African Democratic Rally
- Union for Progress and Reform

Burundi

- Burundo-African Alliance for Salvation

=== C ===
Cambodia

- Khmer Will Party

Canada

- Alberta Liberal Party
- Alberta Party
- Ensemble Montréal
- Green Party of Prince Edward Island
- Liberal Party of Canada
  - Liberal Party of Newfoundland and Labrador
  - New Brunswick Liberal Association
  - Nova Scotia Liberal Party
  - Prince Edward Island Liberal Party
- Manitoba Liberal Party
- Neighbourhoods for a Sustainable Vancouver
- Ontario Liberal Party
- Ontario Moderate Party
- Parti équitable
- Vision Vancouver
- Vrai changement pour Montréal
- Yes Vancouver
- Yukon Liberal Party

Cape Verde

- Movement for Democracy
- Social Democratic Party

Cayman Islands

- Cayman Islands People's Party

Central African Republic

- National Unity Party

Chile

- Christian Democratic Party
- Party of the People

China

- Union of Chinese Nationalists (Unregistered)

Colombia

- Coalition of Hope
  - Green Alliance
  - New Liberalism
- Social Party of National Unity

Congo, Democratic Republic of the

- Democratic Social Christian Party
- National Alliance Party for Unity
- Rally for Congolese Democracy

Congo, Republic of the

- Congolese Movement for Democracy and Integral Development
- Rally for Democracy and Social Progress

Costa Rica

- National Liberation Party

Croatia

- Centre
- Croatian Democratic Peasant Party
- Croatian People's Party – Liberal Democrats
- Croatian Social Liberal Party
- Focus
- Green Party – Green Alternative
- Restart Coalition
  - Alliance of Primorje-Gorski Kotar
  - Croatian Peasant Party
  - Istrian Democratic Assembly
  - People's Party – Reformists
  - Zagorje Party
- Split Party, The
- Youth Action

Cuba

- Christian Democratic Party of Cuba (Banned)

Curaçao

- Real Alternative Party
- Democratic Party
- National People's Party

Cyprus

- Citizens' Alliance
- Democratic Front
- Democratic Party
- Volt Cyprus

Czech Republic

- ANO 2011
- Czech National Social Party
- Czech Pirate Party
- Hlas
- KDU-ČSL (Spolu)
- Liberal-Environmental Party
- Masaryk Democratic Party
- Mayors and Independents
- Moravané
- Party for the Open Society
- Oath Civic Movement
- SNK European Democrats
- Volt Czech Republic

=== D ===
Denmark

- CenterParty
- Christian Democrats
- Citizen List, The
- Danish Social Liberal Party
- Moderates
- Schleswig Party
- Volt Danmark

Dominica

- United Workers' Party

Dominican Republic

- Dominican Liberation Party
- Dominican Revolutionary Party
- Modern Revolutionary Party

=== E ===
Ecuador

- PAIS Alliance
- Patriotic Society Party

Egypt

- Al-Wasat Party
- Civilization Party
- Conference Party (For the Love of Egypt)
- Democratic Jihad Party
- Egypt Party
- Egyptian Current Party
- El-Ghad Party (Egypt, Egyptian Front, For the Love of Egypt)
- Free Egyptians Party (For the Love of Egypt)
- Ghad El-Thawra Party
- Human Rights and Citizenship Party (Call of Egypt)
- Justice Party (Civil Democratic Movement)
- Liberal Egyptian Party
- Modern Egypt Party (For the Love of Egypt, Egyptian Front)
- National Party of Egypt (Egyptian Front)
- Reform and Development Party (Civil Democratic Movement)
- Republican People's Party (Egyptian Front)
- Strong Egypt Party
- Union Party

El Salvador

- Christian Democratic Party
- National Liberal Party
- Nuevas Ideas

Equatorial Guinea

- Popular Action of Equatorial Guinea

Estonia

- Estonia 200
- Estonian Centre Party
- Estonian Party for the Future
- Estonian Reform Party

Eswatini

- African United Democratic Party

Ethiopia

- Ethiopian Citizens for Social Justice
- Ethiopian Democratic Party
- Prosperity Party

=== F ===
Faroe Islands

- Progress
- Self-Government (Danish Social Liberal Party)

Fiji

- FijiFirst
- HOPE

Finland

- Green League
- Centre Party
- Citizens' Party
- Swedish People's Party of Finland

Flanders

- Christian Democratic and Flemish
- Vivant

France

- Agir
- Centrist Alliance
  - Democratic Movement
  - La République En Marche!
  - Radical Party
- Centrists, The
- Ensemble Citoyens
- Independent Ecological Movement
- Modern Left
- New Democrats, The
- Nouvelle Action Royaliste
- Union of Democrats and Independents
- Volt France

French Guiana

- Democratic Forces of Guiana

=== G ===
Gabon

- Union of the Gabonese People

Gambia, The

- Gambia Democratic Congress
- People's Progressive Party
- United Democratic Party

Georgia

- Citizens
- Droa
- European Georgia
- For Georgia
- Freedom Square
- Free Democrats
- Georgian Dream
- Greens Party of Georgia
- Lelo for Georgia
- Progress and Freedom
- Strategy Aghmashenebeli

Germany

- South Schleswig Voters' Association
- Volt Germany

Gibraltar

- Liberal Party of Gibraltar

Greece

- Democratic Revival
- Democrats (2009)
- Democrats (2024)
- Democrats – Progressive Centre
- Drachmi Greek Democratic Movement Five Stars
- Drassi
- Liberal Alliance
- Panathinaikos Movement
- Party of Friendship, Equality and Peace
- Union of Centrists
- Volt Greece

Greenland

- Democrats
- Naleraq

Guam

- Democratic Party of Guam

Guatemala

- Humanist Party of Guatemala

Guinea

- Union of Democratic Forces of Guinea
- Union of Republican Forces

Guyana

- Alliance for Change (A Partnership for National Unity)

=== H ===
Haiti

- Christian Movement for a New Haiti
- Christian National Union for the Reconstruction of Haiti

Honduras

- Liberal Party of Honduras
- Savior Party of Honduras

Hong Kong

- Alliance for Social and Economic Advancement
- Democratic Party (Pro-democracy camp)
- Hong Kong Civic Association (Pro-Beijing camp)
- Path of Democracy (Pro-Beijing camp)
- Professional Commons (Pro-democracy camp)
- Third Side (Pro-Beijing camp)

Hungary

- Momentum Movement
- Hungarian Liberal Party
- New Start

=== I ===
Iceland

- Bright Future
- Dawn
- Progressive Party

India

- Aam Aadmi Party
- All India N.R. Congress
- Biju Janata Dal
- Desiya Murpokku Dravida Kazhagam
- Indian National Congress
- Indian National Lok Dal
- Maharashtrawadi Gomantak Party
- Makkal Needhi Maiam
- Nationalist Congress Party
- United People's Party Liberal
- Makkal Needhi Maiam

Indonesia

- Democratic Party
- Garuda Party
- Gelora Party
- People's Conscience Party
- NasDem Party
- National Awakening Party
- National Mandate Party
- Nusantara Awakening Party

Iran

- Iranian Reformists
  - Democracy Party (Council for Coordinating the Reforms Front)
  - Moderation and Development Party
- National Front (Iranian dissidents)

Iraq

- Al-Wataniya
- Gorran Movement
- Iraqi Constitutional Monarchy
- New Generation Movement
- People's Party
- Victory Alliance

Ireland

- Fianna Fáil

Israel

- Together
- Yesh Atid

Italy

- Action
- Alliance of the Centre (Centre-right coalition)
- Associative Movement Italians Abroad
- Centrists for Europe (Centre-left coalition)
- Coraggio Italia (Centre-right coalition)
- Democratic Centre (Centre-left coalition)
- Edelweiss
- For Our Valley
- For the Autonomies
- For Autonomy
- Italian Liberal Party
- Italy Is Popular
- Italy of Values
- Italia Viva
- More Europe
- New Italian Socialist Party (Centre-right coalition)
- Popular Alternative
- Sardinian Reformers
- Slovene Union
- South Tyrolean People's Party
- Team K
- Trentino Tyrolean Autonomist Party
- Union for Trentino
- Union of the Centre
- Us Moderates
- Valdostan Union

Ivory Coast

- Rally of Houphouëtists for Democracy and Peace
- Union for Democracy and Peace in Ivory Coast

=== J ===
Japan

- Centrist Reform Alliance
- Constitutional Democratic Party of Japan
- Dainiin Club
- Democratic Party for the People
- Democratic Reform Party
- Komeito
- Team Mirai

Jordan

- Rescue and Partnership Party

=== K ===
Kazakhstan

- El Tıregı
- Nur Otan

Kenya

- Amani National Congress (National Super Alliance)
- New Forum for the Restoration of Democracy–Kenya
- United Democratic Forum Party

Kosovo

- Alternative, The
- Independent Liberal Party
- Liberal Party of Kosovo
- New Democratic Initiative of Kosovo
- New Kosovo Alliance
- Parliamentary Party of Kosovo

Kyrgyzstan

- Bir Bol
- Kyrgyzstan
- Onuguu–Progress
- Respublika

=== L ===
Latvia

- Development/For!
- Izaugsme
- Latvian Association of Regions
- Latvian Farmers' Union
- Union of Greens and Farmers
- United for Latvia

Lebanon

- Azm Movement (March 8 Alliance)
- Democratic Renewal (March 14 Alliance)
- Lebanese Option Party
- Lebanese Peace Party (March 14 Alliance)
- National Bloc
- Progressive Socialist Party

Lesotho

- All Basotho Convention

Liberia

- Unity Party

Libya

- Democratic Party
- Ihya Libya
- National Centrist Party
- Union for Homeland

Liechtenstein

- Patriotic Union

Lithuania

- Freedom Party
- Labour Party
- Lithuanian Centre Party
- Lithuanian Farmers and Greens Union
- Lithuanian Green Party
- Lithuanian List

Luxembourg

- Christian Social People's Party
- Democratic Party
- Volt Luxembourg

=== M ===
Macau

- New Hope (Pro-democracy camp
- New Macau Association (Pro-democracy camp

Madagascar

- Movement for the Progress of Madagascar

Malawi

- Democratic Progressive Party
- United Democratic Front
- United Transformation Movement

Malaysia

- Homeland Fighters' Party
- Malaysian Nation Party
- Malaysian United Democratic Alliance
- Malaysian United Party
- Parti Gerakan Rakyat Malaysia (Gabungan Rakyat Sabah, Perikatan Nasional)
- Parti Rakyat Sarawak (Gabungan Parti Sarawak)
- Parti Sarawak Bersatu
- People's Alternative Party
- Sarawak United Peoples' Party (Gabungan Parti Sarawak)

Mali

- Union for the Republic and Democracy

Malta

- Volt Malta

Isle of Man

- Liberal Vannin Party

Mauritania

- El Wiam
- Union for the Republic
- Union of the Forces of Progress

Mauritius

- Militant Socialist Movement

Mexico

- Institutional Revolutionary Party
- New Alliance Party

Moldova

- Our Party
- Rally for the Monegasque Family

Monaco

- National Union for the Future of Monaco
- Union for the Principality
- Union Monégasque

Mongolia

- Civil Will–Green Party

Montenegro

- In Black and White
  - Civis
- Peace is Our Nation
  - Democratic Montenegro
  - DEMOS
  - Party of United Pensioners and the Disabled

Morocco

- National Rally of Independents
- Party of Hope

Myanmar

- Wa Democratic Party

=== N ===
Nepal

- Bibeksheel Sajha Party
- Lok Kalyankari Janta Party Nepal
- Nepal Bahudal Party
- Nepali Congress
- Rastriya Swatantra Party

Netherlands

- 50PLUS
- Christian Democratic Appeal
- Christian Union
- Democrats 66
- Henk Krol List
- JONG
- Independent Senate Group
- Liberal Democratic Party
- New Social Contract
- NLBeter
- Party for the North
- Party for Zeeland
- Splinter
- Volt Netherlands

New Caledonia

- Future Together

New Zealand

- The Opportunity Party

Nigeria

- Action Democratic Party

North Macedonia

- Citizen Option for Macedonia (VMRO-DPMNE)
- Democratic Party of Turks (Social Democratic Union of Macedonia)
- Democratic Renewal of Macedonia
- Liberal Democratic Party
- Liberal Party of Macedonia
- Party for a European Future
- Party of United Pensioners and Citizens of Macedonia (Social Democratic Union of Macedonia)

Northern Cyprus

- People's Party

Northern Ireland

- Alliance Party of Northern Ireland

Norway

- Árja
- Centre Party
- Christian Democratic Party
- Liberal Party

=== P ===
Pakistan

- All Pakistan Muslim League
- Awami Muslim League
- Balochistan Awami Party
- Grand Democratic Alliance
- Muttahida Qaumi Movement – Pakistan
- Pakistan Awami Tehreek
- Pakistan Muslim League (Q)
- Pakistan Tehreek-e-Insaf

Palestine

- Third Way

Paraguay

- Authentic Radical Liberal Party
- Beloved Fatherland Party

Peru

- American Popular Revolutionary Alliance
- Let's Go Peru
- Popular Action
- Purple Party

Philippines

- Aksyon Demokratiko
- Centrist Democratic Party of the Philippines (ref. n. baban)
- Laban ng Demokratikong Pilipino
- Lakas–CMD
  - Sarangani Reconciliation and Reformation Organization
- Liberal Party
- Malay Democrats of the Philippines
- National Unity Party
- Partido Abe Kapampangan
- United Negros Alliance

Poland

- Alliance of Democrats
- Civic Coalition
- Direct Democracy
- German Minority Electoral Committee
- Poland 2050
- Polish Coalition
  - Polish People's Party
  - Union of European Democrats
- Polish Pirate Party
- Silesian Autonomy Movement

Portugal

- National Democratic Alternative
- Together for the People
- Volt Portugal

Puerto Rico

- Popular Democratic Party

=== R ===
Romania

- Save Romania Union

Russia

- Yabloko
- A Just Russia
- Agrarian Party of Russia

=== S ===
Saba

- Windward Islands People's Movement

Scotland

- Scottish Liberal Democrats
- Volt Scotland

Serbia

- Democratic Party
- Liberal Democratic Party
- New Party

Sint Eustatius

- Democratic Party

Slovakia

- Progressive Slovakia
- Slovakia
- Democrats
- For the People
- Volt Slovakia

Slovenia

- Modern Centre Party

South Africa

- Democratic Alliance

South Korea

- Democratic Party of Korea
- Minsaeng Party
- People Party
- Open Democratic Party

Spain

- Canarian Coalition
- Ciudadanos
- Basque Nationalist Party
- Together for Catalonia
- Regionalist Party of Cantabria
- Aragonese Party
- Volt Spain

Sri Lanka

- Samagi Jana Balawegaya

Sweden

- Centre Party
- Volt Sweden

Switzerland

- Centre, The
- Green Liberal Party of Switzerland
- Volt Switzerland

=== T ===
Republic of China (Taiwan)

- Taiwan People's Party
- People First Party
- Non-Partisan Solidarity Union

Timor-Leste

- Democratic Party
- People's Liberation Party
- Social Democratic Party
- Timorese Social Democratic Association

Trinidad and Tobago

- People's National Movement

Turkey

- Independent Turkey Party
- Liberal Democratic Party
- Good Party

=== U ===
Ukraine

- Servant of the People
- Opposition Platform — For Life
- European Solidarity
- All-Ukrainian Union "Fatherland"
- Voice
- Opposition Bloc
- Strong Ukraine
- Volt Ukraine

United Kingdom (Great Britain only)

- Liberal Democrats
- Liberal Party (UK, 1989)
- Renew
- Volt UK

United States

- Alliance Party
- Democratic Party (factions)
  - Blue Dog Coalition
  - New Democrat Coalition
  - New Democrats
- Forward Party
- No Labels
- Reform Party
- Republican Party (factions)
  - Republican Governance Group
  - Republican Main Street Partnership
  - Rockefeller Republicans (historical)
- Unity Party of America

Uruguay

- Colorado Party
- Independent Party

=== V ===
Venezuela

- Democratic Unity Roundtable
  - Democratic Action
  - Popular Will

=== W ===
Wales

- Welsh Liberal Democrats

=== Y ===
Yemen

- General People's Congress

=== Z ===
Zambia

- United Party for National Development

== Former ==
- Andorra - Andorran Democratic Centre
- Armenia - Pan-Armenian National Movement
- Australia - Australia Party, Liberal Movement, New Liberal Movement, Pirate Party Australia, Protectionist Party, Unity Party
- Austria - Liberal Forum
- Barbados - National Democratic Party
- Belarus - All-Belarusian Unity and Accord Party, Belarusian Popular Party, European Coalition Free Belarus
- Bermuda - Bermuda Democratic Alliance, United Bermuda Party
- Bosnia and Herzegovina - Union of Reform Forces of Yugoslavia
- Botswana - Botswana Workers Front
- Brazil - Brazilian Labour Party (1981), Humanist Party of Solidarity, Liberal Party (1985), Party of the Nation's Retirees, Renewal Labour Party, Republican Party, Republican Party of the Social Order, Rio-grandense Republican Party, Social Democratic Party (1945), Social Democratic Party (1987), Social Labour Party, Workers' General Party
- Bulgaria - Bulgarian Agrarian National Union
- Cambodia - Cambodia National Rescue Party, Candlelight Party
- Canada - AffiliationQuebec, Consensus Ontario, Democratic Reform British Columbia, Forum Party of Alberta, Montreal Citizens' Movement, Progressive Conservative Party of Canada, Senate Liberal Caucus, Electors' Action Movement, The, Union Montreal, Unionist Party, United Party of Canada
- Cayman Islands - Cayman Democratic Party
- Chile - Democrat Party, Amplitude, Radical Party of Chile
- Cuba - Democratic Solidarity Party, Liberal Party of Cuba
- Cyprus - New Wave - The other Cyprus
- Czech Republic - Association of Radicals for the United States of Europe, Civic Movement, Movement for Autonomous Democracy–Party for Moravia and Silesia
- Czechoslovakia - Freedom Party, Jewish Party, National Labour Party, Public Against Violence
- Denmark - Centre Democrats, Forward, National Party
- Egypt - National Democratic Party, Saadist Institutional Party
- Estonia - Estonian Biodiversity Party
- Finland - Finnish People's Unity Party
- France - Cap21, Feuillant, Monarchiens
- Germany
  - Divided Germany - All-German People's Party, German Forum Party
  - Nazi Germany - German State Party
  - Weimar Republic - German Democratic Party, National Liberal Party
  - German Empire - Free-minded Union
- Greece - Centre Union, Centre Union – New Forces, Democratic Alliance, French Party, Liberal Party, Liberals, The, National Progressive Center Union, National Unionist Party, River, The
- Hong Kong - Reform Club of Hong Kong
- Hungary - Alliance of Free Democrats, Civic Freedom Party, Independent Hungarian Democratic Party, Together
- Iceland - Union of Liberals and Leftists
- Israel - Center Party, Democratic Movement, Democratic Movement for Change, Gesher – Zionist Religious Centre, Hatnua, Hetz, Independent Liberals, Israeli Liberal Party, Kadima, Kulanu, National Home, National List, Progressive Party, Sephardim and Oriental Communities, Shinui, Tafnit, Telem, Third Way, Yahad
- Japan - Constitutional Democratic Party (Japan, 1927), New Frontier Party (Japan), Democratic Party of Japan
- South Korea - National Congress for New Politics, Democratic Party (South Korea, 2000), United New Democratic Party, Democratic Party (South Korea, 2008), Democratic Party (South Korea, 2011)
  See the article: Liberalism in South Korea
- Spain - Union Progress and Democracy, Union of the Democratic Centre, Democratic and Social Centre, Radical Republican Party, Party of the Democratic Centre, Constitutional Party, Liberal Union
- United Kingdom - Change UK, Liberal Party, Social Democratic Party, Whigs

== See also ==
- List of left-wing political parties
- List of right-wing political parties
- List of syncretic political parties

=== Politics ===
- Centrism
  - Centre-left
  - Centre-right
- Conservatism
  - Moderate conservatism
- Liberalism
  - Social liberalism
- Political moderate
- Third way
- Triangulation (politics)

=== Parties ===
- Alliance of Democrats
- Centre Party (disambiguation)
- Democratic Party
- Liberal International
- Liberal party
- New Democrats
- New Labour
