= 2003 Monegasque general election =

General election in Monaco (European micro-state)

- 9 February 2003
- All 24 seats in the National Council; 13 seats needed for a majority
Party	Leader	Vote %	Seats	+/–
UM	Stéphane Valeri	58.45	21	+21
UND	Jean-Louis Campora	41.55	3	−15
This lists parties that won seats. See the complete results below.
President of the National Council before	President of the National Council after
Jean-Louis Campora; UND	Stéphane Valeri; UP

General elections were held in Monaco on 9 February 2003. The result was a victory for the Union for Monaco alliance, which won 21 of the 24 seats in the National Council. Within the alliance, twelve seats were won by the Union for the Principality, four by the National Union for the Future of Monaco, three by Promotion of the Monegasque Family and two by Rally for Monaco.

== Electoral system ==
Voters can either choose a party list or choose candidates from various lists ("panachage") for the 24 seats. The 16 candidates with the most votes are elected (with the older candidate breaking possible ties in votes). The eight other seats are chosen from lists in accordance with the proportional representation system for parties that have at least five percent of votes.

== Results ==
Party	Votes	%	Seats	+/–
Union for Monaco	60,339	58.45	21	+21
National and Democratic Union	42,892	41.55	3	–15
Total	103,231	100.00	24	+6
Valid votes	4,499	96.59		
Invalid votes	141	3.03		
Blank votes	18	0.39		
Total votes	4,658	100.00		
Registered voters/turnout	5,842	79.73		
Source: Nohlen & Stöver, Journal de Monaco

=== By candidate ===
Party	Candidates	Votes	Total party votes	%	Seats
Union for Monaco	Jacques Rit	2,719	60,399	58.45	21
Union for Monaco	Jean-François Robillon	2,617	60,399	58.45	21
Union for Monaco	Claude Boisson	2,581	60,399	58.45	21
Union for Monaco	Cristophe Spiliotis-Saquet	2,579	60,399	58.45	21
Union for Monaco	Catherine Fautrier	2,571	60,399	58.45	21
Union for Monaco	Anne Poyard-Vatrican	2,552	60,399	58.45	21
Union for Monaco	Jean-Michel Cucchi	2,549	60,399	58.45	21
Union for Monaco	Fabrice Notari	2,541	60,399	58.45	21
Union for Monaco	Jean-Charles Gardetto	2,524	60,399	58.45	21
Union for Monaco	Michèle Dittlot	2,516	60,399	58.45	21
Union for Monaco	Thomas Giaccardi	2,512	60,399	58.45	21
Union for Monaco	Stéphane Valeri	2,511	60,399	58.45	21
Union for Monaco	Vincent Palmaro	2,504	60,399	58.45	21
Union for Monaco	Daniel Raymond	2,503	60,399	58.45	21
Union for Monaco	Bernard Marquet	2,501	60,399	58.45	21
Union for Monaco	Alexandre Bordero	2,496	60,399	58.45	21
Union for Monaco	Jean-Pierre Licari	2,484	60,399	58.45	21
Union for Monaco	Bruno Blanchy	2,474	60,399	58.45	21
Union for Monaco	Brigitte Boccone-Pagès	2,470	60,399	58.45	21
Union for Monaco	Claude Cellario	2,468	60,399	58.45	21
Union for Monaco	Jean-Luc Nigioni	2,437	60,399	58.45	21
Union for Monaco	Christian Berti	2,426	60,399	58.45	21
Union for Monaco	Hervé Gaziello	2,416	60,399	58.45	21
Union for Monaco	René Giordano	2,388	60,399	58.45	21
National and Democratic Union	Henry Rey	1,944	42,892	41.55	3
National and Democratic Union	Christine Pasquier-Ciulla	1,888	42,892	41.55	3
National and Democratic Union	Jean-Joseph Pastor	1,869	42,892	41.55	3
National and Democratic Union	Christophe Steiner	1,850	42,892	41.55	3
National and Democratic Union	Rainier Boisson	1,840	42,892	41.55	3
National and Democratic Union	Michel Boeri	1,839	42,892	41.55	3
National and Democratic Union	Guy Magnan	1,839	42,892	41.55	3
National and Democratic Union	Florence Sosso	1,833	42,892	41.55	3
National and Democratic Union	Patrick Medecin	1,829	42,892	41.55	3
National and Democratic Union	Alain Pastor	1,823	42,892	41.55	3
National and Democratic Union	Alain Sangiorgio	1,815	42,892	41.55	3
National and Democratic Union	Marianne Bertrand-Reynaud	1,812	42,892	41.55	3
National and Democratic Union	Michel Boisson	1,809	42,892	41.55	3
National and Democratic Union	Bertrand Crovetto	1,800	42,892	41.55	3
National and Democratic Union	Robert Scarlot	1,800	42,892	41.55	3
National and Democratic Union	Michel Grinda	1,785	42,892	41.55	3
National and Democratic Union	Dider Martini	1,765	42,892	41.55	3
National and Democratic Union	Jean Tonelli	1,753	42,892	41.55	3
National and Democratic Union	Marie-Thérèse Escaut-Marquet	1,746	42,892	41.55	3
National and Democratic Union	Patrice Solamito	1,707	42,892	41.55	3
National and Democratic Union	Jean-Marie Pastor	1,677	42,892	41.55	3
National and Democratic Union	Alain Michel	1,662	42,892	41.55	3
National and Democratic Union	Caroline Porasso	1,618	42,892	41.55	3
National and Democratic Union	Jean-Louis Campora	1,589	42,892	41.55	3
