= Roxane Noat-Notari =

Member of the National Council
- In office 1963–1983

Member of the Communal Council
- In office 1955–1967

Personal details
- Born: 1913
- Died: 27 March 2004 (aged 90–91)

Roxane Noat-Notari (1913 – 27 March 2004) was a Monegasque politician. In 1963 she was elected to the National Council, becoming its first female member.

== Biography ==
Noat-Notari was one of seven children of Dinah and Louis Notari, a writer and poet.

She was elected to the Communal Council in the 1955 municipal elections, and was re-elected in 1958 and 1963. Although women had been allowed to vote in municipal elections since 1945, it was not until 1962 that the franchise was given to women for National Council elections. A member of the National Democratic Union (UND), Noat-Notari was a candidate in the 1963 National Council elections, the first held under universal suffrage. She was elected as the UND won 17 seats, becoming the first woman in the National Council. In the same year she became the founding president of the World Association of Children's Friends. She was re-elected in 1968, when the UND won all 18 seats, and again in 1973 and 1978.

She later served as president of the administrative council of Guides of Monaco, vice-president of the Monegasque Association for the Aid and Protection of Handicapped Children and on the board of directors of the Red Cross of Monaco, as well as being a member of the national commission of UNESCO. She died on 27 March 2004, aged 91.
