= National Progressive Action =

Political party in Monaco

National Progressive Action was a centre-right political party in Monaco active in the 1990s.

== Electoral results ==
The party won two seats in the National Council at the 1993 Monegasque general election. It was the first time since 1973 that the ruling National and Democratic Union had failed to win all 18 seats.

Before the 1998 election, their two legislators Alain Michel and Patrick Medecin joined the National and Democratic Union.
