= 2008 Monegasque general election =

- 3 February 2008
- All 24 seats in the National Council; 13 seats needed for a majority
Party	Leader	Vote %	Seats	+/–
UM	Stéphane Valeri	52.20	21	0
Rally & Issues		40.49	3	0
This lists parties that won seats. See the complete results below.
President of the National Council before	President of the National Council after
Stéphane Valeri; UP	Stéphane Valeri; UP

General elections were held in Monaco on 3 February 2008. The Union for Monaco was re-elected, though with a reduced margin of victory.

== Electoral system ==
Voters can either choose a party list or choose candidates from various lists ("panachage") for the 24 seats. The 16 candidates with the most votes are elected (with the older candidate breaking possible ties in votes). The eight other seats are chosen from lists in accordance with the proportional representation system for parties that have at least five percent of votes.

== Results ==
Party	Votes	%	Seats	+/–
Union for Monaco	53,523	52.20	21	0
Rally & Issues	41,512	40.49	3	0
Monaco Together	7,491	7.31	0	New
Total	102,526	100.00	24	0
Valid votes	4,650	95.80		
Invalid votes	124	2.55		
Blank votes	80	1.65		
Total votes	4,854	100.00		
Registered voters/turnout	6,316	76.85		
Source: Journal de Monaco, Nohlen & Stöver

=== By candidate ===
Party	Candidates	Votes	Total party votes	%	Seats
Union for Monaco	Jean-François Robillon	2,403	53,523	52.20	21
Union for Monaco	Catherine Fautrier	2,383	53,523	52.20	21
Union for Monaco	Fabrice Notari	2,327	53,523	52.20	21
Union for Monaco	Alexandre Bordero	2,319	53,523	52.20	21
Union for Monaco	Michèle Dittlot	2,313	53,523	52.20	21
Union for Monaco	Pierre Svara	2,303	53,523	52.20	21
Union for Monaco	Jean-Charles S. Gardetto	2,300	53,523	52.20	21
Union for Monaco	Christophe Spiliotis-Saquet	2,279	53,523	52.20	21
Union for Monaco	Stéphane Valeri	2,274	53,523	52.20	21
Union for Monaco	Philippe Clerissi	2,266	53,523	52.20	21
Union for Monaco	Pierre Lorenzi	2,261	53,523	52.20	21
Union for Monaco	Anne Poyard-Vatrican	2,256	53,523	52.20	21
Union for Monaco	Gérard Bertrand	2,247	53,523	52.20	21
Union for Monaco	Brigitte Boccone-Pagès	2,241	53,523	52.20	21
Union for Monaco	Sophie Bouhnik-Lavagna	2,237	53,523	52.20	21
Union for Monaco	Guillaume Rose	2,221	53,523	52.20	21
Union for Monaco	Bernard Marquet	2,184	53,523	52.20	21
Union for Monaco	Claude Cellario	2,167	53,523	52.20	21
Union for Monaco	Nicole Manzone-Saquet	2,133	53,523	52.20	21
Union for Monaco	Eric Guazzonne	2,120	53,523	52.20	21
Union for Monaco	Roland Marquet	2,101	53,523	52.20	21
Union for Monaco	Jessica Alessandri	2,079	53,523	52.20	21
Union for Monaco	Maryse Battaglia	2,067	53,523	52.20	21
Union for Monaco	Isabelle Bonnal	2,042	53,523	52.20	21
Rally & Issues	Christophe Steiner	1,838	41,512	40.49	3
Rally & Issues	Marc Burini	1,798	41,512	40.49	3
Rally & Issues	Laurent Nouvion	1,793	41,512	40.49	3
Rally & Issues	Richard Mullot	1,790	41,512	40.49	3
Rally & Issues	Jean-Baptiste Blanchy	1,764	41,512	40.49	3
Rally & Issues	Bertrand Crovetto	1,760	41,512	40.49	3
Rally & Issues	Rainier Boisson	1,757	41,512	40.49	3
Rally & Issues	Claude Rosticher	1,753	41,512	40.49	3
Rally & Issues	Thierry Poyet	1,751	41,512	40.49	3
Rally & Issues	Elodie Kern-de Millo Terrazzani	1,749	41,512	40.49	3
Rally & Issues	Guy Magnan	1,733	41,512	40.49	3
Rally & Issues	Alain Ficini	1,722	41,512	40.49	3
Rally & Issues	Anne Liberatore-Vittorioso	1,720	41,512	40.49	3
Rally & Issues	Bernard Prat	1,720	41,512	40.49	3
Rally & Issues	Joël Tchobanian	1,719	41,512	40.49	3
Rally & Issues	Guy Baria	1,709	41,512	40.49	3
Rally & Issues	Clade Vaccarezza	1,702	41,512	40.49	3
Rally & Issues	Géraldine De Veigy-Brousse	1,700	41,512	40.49	3
Rally & Issues	Martine Elena	1,689	41,512	40.49	3
Rally & Issues	Patricia Grimaud-Palmero	1,689	41,512	40.49	3
Rally & Issues	Béatrice Fresko-Rolfo	1,684	41,512	40.49	3
Rally & Issues	Georges Dick	1,673	41,512	40.49	3
Rally & Issues	Christian Berti	1,658	41,512	40.49	3
Rally & Issues	Cristina Noghes-Menio	1,641	41,512	40.49	3
Monaco Together	Jacques Rit	830	7,491	7.31	0
Monaco Together	Jean-Pierre Licari	679	7,491	7.31	0
Monaco Together	Claude Boisson	654	7,491	7.31	0
Monaco Together	Jean-Luc Nigioni	583	7,491	7.31	0
Monaco Together	René Giordano	568	7,491	7.31	0
Monaco Together	Daniel Boeri	483	7,491	7.31	0
Monaco Together	Patrice Woolley	471	7,491	7.31	0
Monaco Together	Audrey Le Joliff	437	7,491	7.31	0
Monaco Together	Franck Ferreyrolles	429	7,491	7.31	0
Monaco Together	Pierre Dick	398	7,491	7.31	0
Monaco Together	Guy-Philippe Ferreyrolles	398	7,491	7.31	0
Monaco Together	Martine Geninazza-Baché	396	7,491	7.31	0
Monaco Together	Jean L'Herbon De Lussats	395	7,491	7.31	0
Monaco Together	Gabrielle Mareschi	392	7,491	7.31	0
Monaco Together	Claudine Agliardi	378	7,491	7.31	0
Source: Journal de Monaco
