= Synergie Monegasque =

Monegasque political party

Synergie Monégasque
- Founded: 2005
- Membership: 3 (2018)

Synergie Monégasque (SM) is a Monegasque political association that runs for general elections as a part of conservative alliance Horizon Monaco.

== History and Elections ==
Monegasque Synergy was established in 2005.

In 2008, it was running for elections in a union of three independent movements along with Promotion of the Monegasque Family (PFM) and Association of Non-Attached Monegasques, however they didn't get any seat in the National Council.

In 2013, Monegasque Synergy joined newly formed alliance Horizon Monaco (HM) composed of such political associations as Rally and Issues (Rassemblementet Enjeux pour Monaco), Union for the Principality (Union pour la Principauté) and some independent candidates.

In 2018, Monegasque Synergy again ran for elections as a part of HM and received 3 seats in the Parliament.

== Overview ==
As stated on the association's official website, Monegasque Synergy aims to federate Monegasques around the notions of civic spirit, exemplarity, participation and involvement, as well as calls on Monegasque people's involvement in order to meet the expectations of Monegasque Sovereign and thus build together a model of society.

According to the declaration of the Monegasque Synergy the purpose of association is to “promote the ideals of ethics and progress, with respect for Monegasque institutions, in total loyalty to the person of the Sovereign Prince and to his family, by building a true democracy of responsibility in political life, economic and social of the Principality, to contribute to the defense of the rights of the nationals and all those which live on the Monegasque territory".
