= Thierry Poyet =

Monegasque politician (born 1965)

National Councillor
- Incumbent
- Assumed office 2013

Personal details
- Born: March 25, 1965 (age 61)
- Party: Horizon Monaco (2013-present)
- Spouse: Married
- Children: 2

Thierry Poyet (born March 25, 1965) is a Monegasque politician. He was elected to the National Council in the 2013 Monegasque election as a member for the ruling coalition, Horizon Monaco.
