= Jean-Charles Allavena =

Monegasque politician (born 1960)

National Councillor
- Incumbent
- Assumed office 2013

Personal details
- Born: October 18, 1960 (age 66)
- Party: Horizon Monaco (2013-present)
- Spouse: Married
- Children: 3

Jean-Charles Allavena (born October 18, 1960) is a Monegasque politician. He was elected to the National Council in the 2013 Monegasque election as a member for the ruling coalition, Horizon Monaco. He is the leader of the conservative party Rally & Issues, which is the largest constituent party of the ruling coalition.

== Biography ==
Born in Monaco on October 18, 1960, Jean-Charles Allavena is a graduate engineer from the Ecole Nationale Supérieure des Télécommunications de Bretagne. Successively Head of Section in the Public Works Department in 1987, then Administrative and Financial Director of the Office des Téléphones de Monaco (1989–1993), then Managing Director of Monaco Téléport (1993–1997), and finally Independent Telecommunications Consultant (1998–2016). Since then, he has been Director of the Monte-Carlo Opera.

He was a member of the National Council from 2013 to 2018, elected in the majority coalition at the time, Horizon Monaco. During this mandate, he was Chairman of the External Relations Commission, and in this capacity Chairman of the National Council's delegation to the Parliamentary Assembly of the Council of Europe (of which he was one of the Vice-Presidents - 2013–2014, before becoming one of the Vice-Presidents of the State Obligations Monitoring Commission - 2016–2018). At a local level, he was Rapporteur for a number of important texts during the mandate, such as the law instituting teleworking, or the law modifying the financial monitoring of electoral campaigns and instituting partial reimbursement by the State of campaign expenses.

Vice-president, then President of the Fédération Monégasque de Bridge, FMB (2010–2016), member of the Executive Board of the European Bridge Federation, EBL (2010–2014), initiator of the Jeux des Petites Fédérations, created in Monaco in 2007, he organizes with Pierre Zimmermann, sponsor of the FMB, the Coupe Prince Albert II in 2011, then from 2012 the Cavendish, repatriated from Las Vegas and first the Winter Games in 2016 and 2018.
