= Renaissance (Monegasque political party) =

Political party in Monaco

- Leader: Eric Elena
- Founded: 2012
- Merged into: Union Monégasque
- Ideology: Interests of SBM dealers
- National Council: 0 / 24

Renaissance was a political party in Monaco that represents the interests of SBM employees. They won 10.67% of the popular vote, and 1 out of 24 seats in the legislative elections held on February 10, 2013. The seat was held by Eric Elena. The party announced that they would not participate in the 2018 elections yet later rejoined the same elections. After this the party did not participate in any other elections.

== Electoral history ==
=== National Council elections ===
Election	Votes	%	Seats	+/–	Position
2013	11,964	10.67%	1 / 24	▲1	▲3rd
