= 1998 Monegasque general election =

General election in Monaco (European micro-state)

- 1 February 1998 (first round); 8 February 1998 (second round)
- All 18 seats in the National Council; 10 seats needed for a majority
Party	Leader	Vote %	Seats	+/–
UND	Jean-Louis Campora	67.40	18	+3
This lists parties that won seats. See the complete results below.
President of the National Council before	President of the National Council after
Jean-Louis Campora; UND	Jean-Louis Campora; UND

General elections were held in Monaco on 1 February 1998, with a second round of voting on 8 February. The result was a victory for the National and Democratic Union, which won all 18 seats in the National Council.

== Electoral system ==
Voters can either choose a party list or choose candidates from various lists ("panachage") for the 18 seats. To be elected, a candidate must receive a majority of valid votes, and if the 18 seats are not filled in the first round, the remaining seats are elected in a second round by a simple majority.

== Results ==
Party	First round			Second round			Total seats	+/–
Party	Votes	%	Seats	Votes	%	Seats	Total seats	+/–
National and Democratic Union	32,531	67.40	15	3,999	49.50	3	18	+3
National Union for the Future of Monaco	11,285	23.38	0	3,196	39.56	0	0	New
Rally for the Monegasque Family	4,446	9.21	0	883	10.93	0	0	New
Total	48,262	100.00	15	8,078	100.00	3	18	0
Valid votes	3,453	95.07		3,149	97.19			
Invalid votes	138	3.80		77	2.38			
Blank votes	41	1.13		14	0.43			
Total votes	3,632	100.00		3,240	100.00			
Registered voters/turnout	4,931	73.66		4,932	65.69			
Source: Journal de Monaco, Nohlen & Stöver

=== By candidate ===
==== First round ====
Party	Candidate	Votes	%
National and Democratic Union	Henry Rey	2,008	58.15
National and Democratic Union	Jean-Joseph Pastor	1,939	56.15
National and Democratic Union	Michel Grinda	1,928	55.84
National and Democratic Union	Michel Boeri	1,872	54.21
National and Democratic Union	Jean-Louis Campora	1,868	54.10
National and Democratic Union	Guy Magnan	1,855	53.72
National and Democratic Union	Rainier Boisson	1,842	53.34
National and Democratic Union	Patrick Medecin	1,839	53.26
National and Democratic Union	Marie-Thérèse Escaut-Marquet	1,812	52.48
National and Democratic Union	Michel Boisson	1,807	52.33
National and Democratic Union	Robert Scarlot	1,796	52.01
National and Democratic Union	Christophe Steiner	1,778	51.49
National and Democratic Union	Christine Pasquier-Ciulla	1,759	50.94
National and Democratic Union	Alain Michel	1,747	50.59
National and Democratic Union	Marianne Bertrand-Reynaud	1,731	50.13
National and Democratic Union	Jean Tonelli	1,686	48.83
National and Democratic Union	Florence Sosso	1,674	48.48
National and Democratic Union	Francis Palmaro	1,590	46.05
National Union for the Future of Monaco	Michel-Yves Mourou	1,100	31.86
National Union for the Future of Monaco	Claude Boisson	964	27.92
National Union for the Future of Monaco	Jean-Charles Gardetto	955	27.66
National Union for the Future of Monaco	Bruno Blanchy	931	26.96
National Union for the Future of Monaco	Claude Cellario	895	25.92
National Union for the Future of Monaco	Gerard Borgia	881	25.51
National Union for the Future of Monaco	Rodolphe Berlin	844	24.44
National Union for the Future of Monaco	Pierre-Yves Canton	816	23.63
National Union for the Future of Monaco	Michèle Dittlot	812	23.52
National Union for the Future of Monaco	Monique Gastaud	807	23.37
National Union for the Future of Monaco	Nathalie Amoratti-Blanc	773	22.39
National Union for the Future of Monaco	Sylvie Calais	759	21.98
National Union for the Future of Monaco	Nicole Vaccarezza	748	21.66
Rally for the Monegasque Family	René Giordano	972	28.15
Rally for the Monegasque Family	Gerard Bertrand	743	21.52
Rally for the Monegasque Family	Jean-Pierre Licari	728	21.08
Rally for the Monegasque Family	Jean-Luc Nigioni	721	20.88
Rally for the Monegasque Family	Gabrielle Grassi	664	19.23
Rally for the Monegasque Family	Blanche Medecin	618	17.90
Total		48,262	100.00
Valid votes		3,453	95.07
Invalid votes		138	3.80
Blank votes		41	1.13
Total votes		3,632	100.00
Registered voters/turnout		4,931	73.66
Source: Journal de Monaco

==== Second round ====
Party	Candidate	Votes	%
National and Democratic Union	Francis Palmaro	1,373	43.60
National and Democratic Union	Jean Tonelli	1,323	42.01
National and Democratic Union	Florence Sosso	1,303	41.38
National Union for the Future of Monaco	Michel-Yves Mourou	1,220	38.74
National Union for the Future of Monaco	Jean-Charles Gardetto	996	31.63
National Union for the Future of Monaco	Claude Boisson	980	31.12
Rally for the Monegasque Family	René Giordano	883	28.04
Total		8,078	100.00
Valid votes		3,149	97.19
Invalid votes		77	2.38
Blank votes		14	0.43
Total votes		3,240	100.00
Registered voters/turnout		4,932	65.69
Source: Journal de Monaco
