= National Democratic Entente =

The National Democratic Entente (French: Entente Nationale Démocratique, END) was a political party in Monaco led by Louis Aureglia.

== History ==
The END won 7 of the 18 seats in the National Council in the 1958 elections. In 1962 it merged with the National Union of Independents to form the National Democratic Union, which won 17 seats in the 1963 elections.
