= Stéphane Valeri =

Monegasque politician

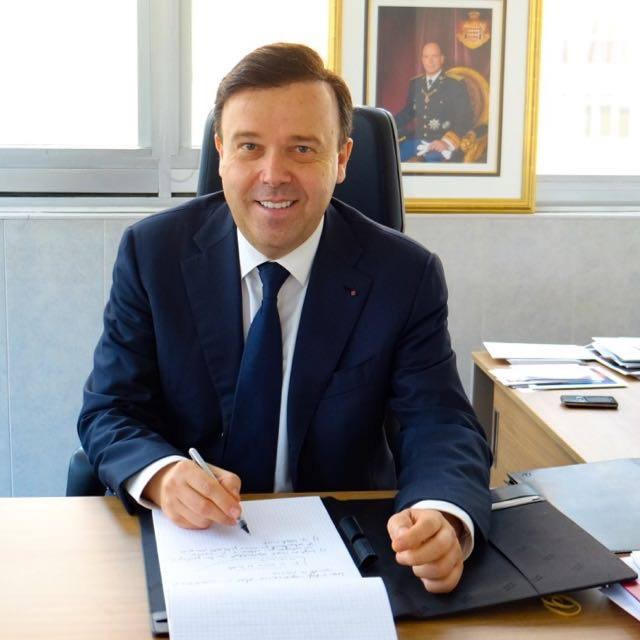

President of the National Council
- In office 22 February 2018 – 23 October 2022
- Monarch: Albert II
- Preceded by: Christophe Steiner
- Succeeded by: Brigitte Boccone-Pagès
- In office 2003–2010
- Monarchs: Rainier III; Albert II
- Preceded by: Jean-Louis Campora
- Succeeded by: Jean-François Robillon

Minister for Social Affairs and Health
- In office 11 January 2010 – 31 May 2017
- Monarch: Albert II
- Succeeded by: Didier Gamerdinger

National Councillor
- In office 1988–2003
- Monarch: Rainier III

Personal details
- Born: 1 March 1962 (age 64) Princess Grace Hospital, La Colle, Monaco
- Party: National & Democratic Union (1988–2003); Union for the Principality (2003–2010); Primo ! Priorité Monaco (2017–present)

Stéphane Valeri (born 1 March 1962) is a Monegasque politician and businessman. He served as the president of the National Council, which is the most powerful elected position in Monaco, between 22 February 2018 and 23 October 2022. He is the former Minister for Social Affairs and Health in Monaco. He served three terms as a National Councillor, and then as its president, but resigned halfway through the second term so that he could serve as a Government Minister.

== Early life and education ==
While growing up Valeri attended two high schools (Lycée Albert Prime, and Lycée Masséna), as well as the European School of Management in East Berlin.

== Career ==
Valeri previously served as executive assistant for SBM's Sales-Marketing department, but transferred a year late to the Advertising-Promotions department.

Following his departure from SBM, Valeri founded Monaco-based communications group PROMOCOM. After twenty-one years as Deputy Chairman (1988–2009), Valeri resigned from his position and entered public service. Outside of politics, Valeri serves on the board of directors for the Prince Albert II of Monaco Foundation.

In 1999, Prince Rainier III awarded him with the Order of Saint-Charles. In 2012, Valeri was appointed to the French Legion of Honour. On 25 January 2013 Valeri's French country home in Peille was damaged by an arsonist. Valeri filed an official complaint the following day.

After winning the 2018 general election, Valeri once again became president of the National Council. He did not stand in the 2023 general election and was succeeded as president by Brigitte Boccone-Pagès.
