= 1993 Monegasque general election =

- 24 January 1993 (first round); 31 January 1993 (second round)
- All 18 seats in the National Council; 10 seats needed for a majority
Party	Leader	Vote %	Seats	+/–
UND	Jean-Louis Campora	80.12	15	−3
APN		16.93	2	New
Independents	–	2.94	1	+1
This lists parties that won seats. See the complete results below.
President of the National Council before	President of the National Council after
Jean-Charles Rey; UND	Jean-Louis Campora; UND

General elections were held in Monaco on 24 January 1993, with a second round of voting on 31 January. The result was a victory for the National and Democratic Union, which won 15 of the 18 seats in the National Council, the first time since 1973 that it had failed to win all 18 seats.

== Electoral system ==
Voters can either choose a party list or choose candidates from various lists ("panachage") for the 18 seats. To be elected a candidate must receive a majority of valid votes. If the 18 seats are not filled in the first round, the remaining seats are elected in a second round by a simple majority.

== Results ==
Party	First round			Second round			Total seats	+/–
Party	Votes	%	Seats	Votes	%	Seats	Total seats	+/–
National and Democratic Union	31,292	80.12	14	3,547	41.12	1	15	–3
National Progressive Action	6,612	16.93	0	3,621	41.97	2	2	New
Independents	1,150	2.94	0	1,459	16.91	1	1	+1
Total	39,054	100.00	14	8,627	100.00	4	18	0
Valid votes	3,247	96.81		2,958	96.95			
Invalid votes	86	2.56		81	2.65			
Blank votes	21	0.63		12	0.39			
Total votes	3,354	100.00		3,051	100.00			
Registered voters/turnout	4,580	73.23		4,582	66.59			
Source: Journal de Monaco, Nohlen & Stöver

=== By candidate ===
==== First round ====
Party	Candidate	Votes	%
National and Democratic Union	Stéphane Valeri	1,987	61.19
National and Democratic Union	Jean-Joseph Pastor	1,944	59.87
National and Democratic Union	Michel-Yves Mourou	1,934	59.56
National and Democratic Union	Henry Rey	1,878	57.84
National and Democratic Union	Henri Fissore	1,862	57.35
National and Democratic Union	Guy Magnan	1,852	57.04
National and Democratic Union	Claude Boisson	1,843	56.76
National and Democratic Union	Max Brousse	1,838	56.61
National and Democratic Union	Rodolphe Berlin	1,782	54.88
National and Democratic Union	Jean-Louis Campora	1,766	54.39
National and Democratic Union	Marie-Thérèse Escaut-Marquet	1,716	52.85
National and Democratic Union	Rainier Boisson	1,709	52.63
National and Democratic Union	Claude Cellario	1,703	52.45
National and Democratic Union	Michel Boeri	1,666	51.31
National and Democratic Union	Joëlle Pastor-Pouget	1,501	46.23
National and Democratic Union	Francis Palmaro	1,491	45.92
National and Democratic Union	Charles Lorenzi	1,463	45.06
National and Democratic Union	Pierre Crovetto	1,357	41.79
National Progressive Action	Jean-Louis Medecin	1,179	36.31
National Progressive Action	Alain Michel	1,029	31.69
National Progressive Action	Francine Gaggino-Pierre	954	29.38
National Progressive Action	Patrick Medecin	928	28.58
National Progressive Action	Georges Aimone	905	27.87
National Progressive Action	Maurice Gaziello	866	26.67
National Progressive Action	Etienne Leandri	751	23.13
Independent	René Giordano	1,150	35.42
Total		39,054	100.00
Valid votes		3,247	96.81
Invalid votes		86	2.56
Blank votes		21	0.63
Total votes		3,354	100.00
Registered voters/turnout		4,580	73.23
Source: Journal de Monaco

==== Second round ====
Party	Candidate	Votes	%
National Progressive Action	Alain Michel	1,010	34.14
National Progressive Action	Patrick Medecin	942	31.85
National Progressive Action	Francine Gaggino-Pierre	918	31.03
National Progressive Action	Maurice Gaziello	751	25.39
National and Democratic Union	Francis Palmaro	975	32.96
National and Democratic Union	Charles Lorenzi	910	30.76
National and Democratic Union	Jean Aubert	841	28.43
National and Democratic Union	Danielle Billard	821	27.76
Independent	René Giordano	1,459	49.32
Total		8,627	100.00
Valid votes		2,958	96.95
Invalid votes		81	2.65
Blank votes		12	0.39
Total votes		3,051	100.00
Registered voters/turnout		4,582	66.59
Source: Journal de Monaco
