= Eric Elena =

Monégasque politician

Éric Elena

National Councillor
- Incumbent
- Assumed office 2013

Personal details
- Born: August 6, 1962 (age 63)
- Party: Renaissance (2013-present)
- Spouse: Married
- Children: 2

Éric Elena (born August 6, 1962) is a Monégasque politician. He was elected to the National Council as the sole politician from the Renaissance party in the 2013 Monegasque election. He is also president of the Monaco Basketball Association. He is the brother of rally co-driver Daniel Elena.
