= 1983 Monegasque general election =

- 9 January 1983
- All 18 seats in the National Council; 10 seats needed for a majority
| Party | Leader | Vote % | Seats | +/– |
|---|---|---|---|---|
| UND | Jean-Charles Rey | 87.67 | 18 | 0 |
This lists parties that won seats. See the complete results below.
| President of the National Council before | President of the National Council after |
|---|---|
| Jean-Charles Rey; UND | Jean-Charles Rey; UND |

General elections were held in Monaco on 9 January 1983. The result was a victory for the National and Democratic Union, which won all 18 seats in the National Council.

== Electoral system ==
Voters can either choose a party list or choose candidates from various lists ("panachage") for the 18 seats. To be elected a candidate must receive a majority of valid votes. If the 18 seats are not filled in the first round, the remaining seats are elected in a second round by a simple majority.

== Results ==
| Party | Votes | % | Seats | +/– |
|---|---|---|---|---|
| National and Democratic Union | 34,150 | 87.67 | 18 | 0 |
| Monegasque Democratic and Socialist Union | 2,723 | 6.99 | 0 | New |
| Independents | 2,078 | 5.33 | 0 | 0 |
| Total | 38,951 | 100.00 | 18 | 0 |
| Valid votes | 2,846 | 96.44 | | |
| Invalid votes | 84 | 2.85 | | |
| Blank votes | 21 | 0.71 | | |
| Total votes | 2,951 | 100.00 | | |
| Registered voters/turnout | 3,904 | 75.59 | | |
Source: Journal de Monaco Nohlen & Stöver

=== By candidate ===
| Party | Candidate | Votes | % |
|---|---|---|---|
| National and Democratic Union | Jean-Joseph Pastor | 2,107 | 74.03 |
| National and Democratic Union | Michel Mourou | 2,090 | 73.44 |
| National and Democratic Union | Marie-Thérèse Escaut-Marquet | 2,042 | 71.75 |
| National and Democratic Union | Jean-Charles Rey | 1,989 | 69.89 |
| National and Democratic Union | Henri Rey | 1,979 | 69.54 |
| National and Democratic Union | Max Brousse | 1,957 | 68.76 |
| National and Democratic Union | Honorine Cornaglia-Rouffignac | 1,945 | 68.34 |
| National and Democratic Union | Rainier Boisson | 1,938 | 68.10 |
| National and Democratic Union | Michel Boeri | 1,936 | 68.03 |
| National and Democratic Union | Edmond Aubert | 1,891 | 66.44 |
| National and Democratic Union | Guy Magnan | 1,890 | 66.41 |
| National and Democratic Union | Charles Lorenzi | 1,872 | 65.78 |
| National and Democratic Union | Pierre Crovetto | 1,862 | 65.43 |
| National and Democratic Union | Jean-Jo Marquet | 1,802 | 63.32 |
| National and Democratic Union | Jean-Louis Campora | 1,779 | 62.51 |
| National and Democratic Union | Francis Palmaro | 1,766 | 62.05 |
| National and Democratic Union | Max Principale | 1,705 | 59.91 |
| National and Democratic Union | Emile Gaziello | 1,600 | 56.22 |
| Monegasque Democratic and Socialist Union | Charles Soccal | 882 | 30.99 |
| Monegasque Democratic and Socialist Union | René Giordano | 732 | 25.72 |
| Monegasque Democratic and Socialist Union | Gérard Porasso | 644 | 22.63 |
| Monegasque Democratic and Socialist Union | Angèle Braquetti | 465 | 16.34 |
| Independent | Baptiste Marsan | 977 | 34.33 |
| Independent | Paul Antonini | 713 | 25.05 |
| Independent | Bernard Brico | 388 | 13.63 |
| Total | | 38,951 | 100.00 |
| Valid votes | | 2,846 | 96.44 |
| Invalid votes | | 84 | 2.85 |
| Blank votes | | 21 | 0.71 |
| Total votes | | 2,951 | 100.00 |
| Registered voters/turnout | | 3,904 | 75.59 |
Source: Journal de Monaco
