= List of political parties in Monaco =

The following is a list of political parties in Monaco. Monaco has a multi-party system. Several parties belong to the Monegasque National Union electoral alliance. Representation in the National Council is held by Priorité Monaco, Horizon Monaco, and Union Monégasque, while New Ideas for Monaco is not represented in the National Council.

== List of parties ==
Alliance	Party	Abbr.	Leader	Ideology	Council
Monegasque; National Union; Union Nationale; Monégasque	Priorité Monaco	PM	Stéphane Valeri	Liberalism; Euroscepticism; Monarchism	13 / 24
Monegasque; National Union; Union Nationale; Monégasque	Horizon Monaco	HM	Laurent Nouvion	Conservatism; Euroscepticism; Monarchism	8 / 24
Monegasque; National Union; Union Nationale; Monégasque	Union Monégasque	UM	Jean-François Robillon	Euroscepticism; Monarchism	3 / 24
New Ideas for Monaco; Nouvelles Idées pour Monaco		NIM	Daniel Boéri	Environmentalism	0 / 24
