= Democratic Union Movement =

Democratic Union Movement Mouvement Union Démocratique
- Founded: 1963
- Ideology: Communism; Socialism; Trade unionism

The Democratic Union Movement (French: Mouvement Union Démocratique, MUD) was a political alliance in Monaco.

== History ==
The MUD was established in 1963 as an alliance of trade unions and Communists, including the Union of Trade Unions of Monaco. It won one seat in the 1963 elections, with the National Democratic Union (UND) winning the other 17. It lost its seat in the 1968 elections (in which the UND won all 18 seats), but won a single seat again in the 1973 elections. It lost the seat in 1978, and did not contest any further elections.

== Election results ==
=== National Council elections ===
Election	Votes	%	Seats	+/–	Position
1963			1 / 18	New	2nd
1968	2,691	9.17	0 / 18	▼1	2nd
1973	1,377	3.59	1 / 18	▲1	2nd
1978	2,027	6.43	0 / 18	▼1	2nd
