= Elections in Monaco =

Monaco elects on the national level a legislature (parliament). The National Council (Conseil National) has 24 members, elected for a five-year term, 16 elected by a winner-take-all plurality system, and the other 8 by proportional representation. Each voter may cast a ballot with up to 16 candidates' names. First, the 16 individuals with the most votes are elected. Then, votes are counted by party groups to fill the remaining 8 seats. E.g., if a party polled 51% of the votes it would probably win 20 out of 24 seats (all 16 of the winner-take-all seats and then 4 of the 8 proportional seats).

== Latest elections ==
=== 2023 ===
Party	Votes	%	Seats	+/–
Monegasque National Union	72,602	89.63	24	0
New Ideas for Monaco	8,401	10.37	0	New
Total	81,003	100.00	24	0
Valid votes	3,948	90.80		
Invalid votes	254	5.84		
Blank votes	146	3.36		
Total votes	4,348	100.00		
Registered voters/turnout	7,594	57.26		
Source: Mairie de Monaco

=== 2018 ===
Party	Votes	%	+/–	Seats	+/–
Primo! Priorité Monaco	63,806	57.71	New	21	New
Horizon Monaco	28,858	26.10	–24.24	2	–18
Union Monégasque	17,895	16.19	–22.80	1	–2
Total	110,559	100.00	–	24	0
Valid votes	4,822	94.60			
Invalid/blank votes	275	5.40			
Total votes	5,097	100.00			
Registered voters/turnout	7,245	70.35			
Source: Mairie de Monaco, Mairie de Monaco

== See also ==
- Electoral calendar
- Electoral system
