= List of elections in 1921 =

The following elections occurred in the year 1921.

- 1921 Belgian general election
- 1921 Chilean parliamentary election
- 1921 Costa Rican parliamentary election
- 1921 Guatemalan presidential election
- 1921 Italian general election
- 1921 Northern Ireland general election
- 1921 Norwegian parliamentary election

== Africa ==
- 1921 South African general election

== Asia ==
- 1921 Ceylonese Legislative Council election
- 1921 Dutch East Indies Volksraad election
- 1921 Persian legislative election

== Americas ==
=== Canada ===
- Canada
  - 1921 Canadian federal election
  - 1921 Alberta general election
  - 1921 Edmonton municipal election
  - 1921 Saskatchewan general election
  - 1921 Toronto municipal election

=== United States ===
- 1921 New York state election

==== United States gubernatorial ====
- 1921 North Dakota gubernatorial recall election
- 1921 United States gubernatorial elections
- 1921 Virginia gubernatorial election

==== United States House of Representatives ====
- 1921 United States House of Representatives elections

==== United States Senate ====
- 1921 United States Senate elections
- 1921 United States Senate special election in New Mexico

==== United States mayoral elections ====
- 1921 Boston mayoral election
- 1921 Los Angeles mayoral election
- 1921 Manchester, New Hampshire, mayoral election
- 1921 Miami mayoral election
- 1921 New York City mayoral election
- 1921 Pittsburgh mayoral election
- 1921 San Diego mayoral election

== Europe ==
- 1921 Albanian parliamentary election
- 1921 Belgian general election
- 1921 Danish local elections
- 1921 Liechtenstein local elections
- Irish elections
- 1921 Northern Ireland general election
- 1920 Hungarian parliamentary election
- Italian general election
- Monegasque general election
- Norwegian parliamentary election
- 1921 Portuguese legislative election
- Free State of Prussia (Germany): Landtag of Prussia election
- 1921 Swedish general election
- 1921 Swiss referendums
- United Kingdom:
  - 1921 Abingdon by-election
  - 1921 Bedford by-election
  - 1921 Bewdley by-election
  - 1921 Caerphilly by-election
  - 1921 Cardiganshire by-election
  - 1921 Chichester by-election
  - 1921 Dover by-election
  - 1921 Dudley by-election
  - 1921 East Dorset by-election
  - 1921 Hastings by-election
  - 1921 Hereford by-election
  - 1921 Heywood and Radcliffe by-election
  - 1921 Kirkcaldy Burghs by-election
  - 1921 Lewisham West by-election
  - 1921 Louth by-election
  - 1921 Mid Armagh by-election
  - 1921 Mid Down by-election
  - 1921 Northern Ireland general election
  - 1921 Orkney and Shetland by-election
  - 1921 Penistone by-election
  - 1921 Penrith and Cockermouth by-election
  - 1921 South Londonderry by-election
  - 1921 Southwark South East by-election
  - 1921 Taunton by-election
  - 1921 Westminster Abbey by-election
  - 1921 Westminster St George's by-election
  - 1921 West Down by-election
  - 1921 Woolwich East by-election

== Oceania ==
=== Australia ===
- 1921 Maranoa by-election
- 1921 Parramatta by-election
- 1921 West Sydney by-election
- 1921 South Australian state election
- 1921 Victorian state election
- 1921 Western Australian state election

=== New Zealand ===
  - 1921 Auckland East by-election
  - 1921 Patea by-election

== See also ==
- Category:1921 elections
