= 1946 Monegasque general election =

General elections were held in Monaco on 15 December 1946 with a second round on 22 December 1946 to elect the 18 members of the National Council.

== Electoral system ==
Voters can either choose a party list or choose candidates from various lists ("panachage") for the 18 seats. To be elected a candidate must receive a majority of valid votes. If the 18 seats are not filled in the first round, the remaining seats are elected in a second round by a simple majority.

== Results ==
=== First round ===
Candidates	Votes
Jean-Charles Marquet	483
Louis Auréglia	397
Joseph Fissore	360
Charles de Castro	359
Michel Fontana	358
Charles Bernasconi	354
Étienne Boéri	349
Dr. Bernasconi	346
Jean-Marie Notari	346
Jean-Charles Rey	339
Valid ballots	677
Invalid ballots	19
Total ballots	696
Registered voters	888
Source: Journal de Monaco

=== Second round ===
Candidates	Votes
Auguste Médecin	332
Georges Blanchy	309
Arthur Crovetto	302
Robert Boisson	296
Dr. Joseph Simon	293
Guy Brousse	285
Jean Sbarrato	277
Robert Sanmori	271
Valid ballots	635
Invalid ballots	7
Total ballots	642
Registered voters	888
Source: Journal de Monaco
