= 1988 Monegasque general election =

- 24 January 1988
- All 18 seats in the National Council; 10 seats needed for a majority
Party	Leader	Vote %	Seats	+/–
UND	Jean-Charles Rey	96.26	18	0
This lists parties that won seats. See the complete results below.
President of the National Council before	President of the National Council after
Jean-Charles Rey; UND	Jean-Charles Rey; UND

General elections were held in Monaco on 24 January 1988. The result was a victory for the National and Democratic Union, which won all 18 seats in the National Council.

== Electoral system ==
Voters can either choose a party list or choose candidates from various lists ("panachage") for the 18 seats. To be elected a candidate must receive a majority of valid votes. If the 18 seats are not filled in the first round, the remaining seats are elected in a second round by a simple majority.

== Results ==
Party	Votes	%	Seats	+/–
National and Democratic Union	29,953	96.26	18	0
Independents	1,164	3.74	0	0
Total	31,117	100.00	18	0
Valid votes	2,830	93.09		
Invalid votes	155	5.10		
Blank votes	55	1.81		
Total votes	3,040	100.00		
Registered voters/turnout	4,244	71.63		
Source: Journal de Monaco Nohlen & Stöver

=== By candidate ===
Party	Candidate	Votes	%
National and Democratic Union	Jean-Joseph Pastor	1,779	62.86
National and Democratic Union	Michel Mourou	1,748	61.77
National and Democratic Union	Michel Boeri	1,715	60.60
National and Democratic Union	Henry Rey	1,715	60.60
National and Democratic Union	Jean-Charles Rey	1,711	60.46
National and Democratic Union	Rainier Boisson	1,703	60.18
National and Democratic Union	Marie-Thérèse Escaut-Marquet	1,701	60.11
National and Democratic Union	Max Brousse	1,692	59.79
National and Democratic Union	Edmond Albert	1,670	59.01
National and Democratic Union	Charles Lorenzi	1,666	58.87
National and Democratic Union	Jean-Louis Campora	1,648	58.23
National and Democratic Union	Maxime Principale	1,646	58.16
National and Democratic Union	Francis Palmaro	1,637	57.84
National and Democratic Union	Joëlle Pastor-Poget	1,628	57.53
National and Democratic Union	Guy Magnan	1,620	57.24
National and Democratic Union	Jean-Joseph Marquet	1,602	56.61
National and Democratic Union	Pierre Crovetto	1,590	56.18
National and Democratic Union	Stéphane Valeri	1,482	52.37
Independent	René Giordano	1,164	41.13
Total		31,117	100.00
Valid votes		2,830	93.09
Invalid votes		155	5.10
Blank votes		55	1.81
Total votes		3,040	100.00
Registered voters/turnout		4,244	71.63
Source: Journal de Monaco
