= USM =

USM may stand for:

== General topics ==
- Samui Airport, in Thailand (IATA airport code)
- Ultimate Soccer Manager
- Ultimate Spider-Man
- Ultrasonic motor, the motor drive used in some Canon EF and EF-S lenses
- Union of Monaco Trade Unions (Union des Syndicats de Monaco)
- United States Marines
- United States of Mexico
- United States Military
- United States Mint
- United States of Mind, a studio album by the band Covenant
- Unlisted Securities Market
- Unsharp masking, an image processing method
- United Socialist Movement, UK, 1934-1965
- Ultrasonic machining
- USM Holdings, a large Russian holding company

== Computing ==
- Universal Storage Media – a type of device that, when connected to a computer, shows up as a storage device without the need for additional drivers
- Universal Storage Module – a standard for cableless plug-in slot-powered storage for consumer electronics devices
- User-based Security Model – a security standard for the Simple Network Management Protocol (SNMP)
- Universal Subscription Mechanism – a protocol for the Rich Site Summary (RSS) standard

== Universities ==
- University System of Maryland
- University School of Milwaukee
- Universiti Sains Malaysia, Penang, Malaysia
- University of Southern Maine
- University of Southern Mindanao, Philippines
- University of Southern Mississippi
- Federico Santa María Technical University (also known as UTFSM or USM)

== See also ==
- Carter USM, or Carter the Unstoppable Sex Machine, a British rock band
- USM Alger, a football club
