= National Union of Independents (Monaco) =

The National Union of Independents (French: Union Nationale des Indépendants, UND) was a conservative political party in Monaco led by Joseph Simon.

== History ==
The UND was established following a financial scandal in 1955 when the Société Monégasque de Banque was bankrupted, holding a significant amount of government funds. It won 11 of the 18 seats in the National Council in the 1958 elections. In 1962 it merged with the National Democratic Entente to form the National Democratic Union, which won 17 seats in the 1963 elections.

== Ideology ==
A conservative party, the UND called for constitutional reforms, an expansion of political rights and government accountability.
