= 1955 Monegasque general election =

General elections were held in Monaco on 27 November 1955 to elect the 18 members of the National Council.

== Electoral system ==
Voters could either choose a party list or choose candidates from various lists ("panachage") for the 18 seats. To be elected a candidate had to receive a majority of valid votes. If the 18 seats were not filled in the first round, the remaining seats would be elected in a second round by a simple majority.

== Results ==
=== First round ===
Candidate	Votes	%
Louis Aureglia	735	78.69
Jean-Charles Marquet	677	72.48
Louis Caravel	640	68.52
Roger-Félix Médecin	577	61.78
Charles Sangiorgio	542	58.03
Philippe Sanita	530	56.75
Émile Gaziello	528	56.53
René Sangiorgio	524	56.10
Alexandre de Millo-Terrazzani	518	55.46
Louis Passeron	510	54.60
Jean-Eugène Lorenzi	505	54.07
Jean-Joseph Marquet	476	50.96
Philippe Fontana	472	50.54
Charles Médecin	470	50.32
Julien Médecin	433	46.36
Max Brousse	336	35.97
Charles Soccal	290	31.05
Robert Sanmori	197	21.09
Guy Brousse	192	20.56
Jean Sbarrato	165	17.67
Total	9,317	100.00
Valid votes	934	99.36
Invalid/blank votes	6	0.64
Total votes	940	100.00
Registered voters/turnout	1,170	80.34
Source: Journal de Monaco
