= 1978 Monegasque general election =

- 15 January 1978
- All 18 seats in the National Council; 10 seats needed for a majority
Party	Leader	Vote %	Seats	+/–
UND	Jean-Charles Rey	84.53	18	+2
This lists parties that won seats. See the complete results below.
President of the National Council before	President of the National Council after
August Médecin; UND	Jean-Charles Rey; UND

General elections were held in Monaco on 15 January 1978. The result was a victory for the National and Democratic Union, which won all 18 seats in the National Council.

== Electoral system ==
Voters can either choose a party list or choose candidates from various lists ("panachage") for the 18 seats. To be elected a candidate must receive a majority of valid votes. If the 18 seats are not filled in the first round, the remaining seats are elected in a second round by a simple majority.

== Results ==
Party	Votes	%	Seats	+/–
National and Democratic Union	26,640	84.53	18	+2
Monegasque Socialist Party	2,116	6.71	0	New
Democratic Union Movement	2,027	6.43	0	–1
Independents	734	2.33	0	–
Total	31,517	100.00	18	0
Valid votes	2,570	94.52		
Invalid votes	129	4.74		
Blank votes	20	0.74		
Total votes	2,719	100.00		
Registered voters/turnout	3,647	74.55		
Source: Journal de Monaco, Nohlen & Stöver

=== By candidate ===
Party	Candidate	Votes	%
National and Democratic Union	Jean-Joseph Pastor	1,636	63.66
National and Democratic Union	Michel Mourou	1,626	63.27
National and Democratic Union	Max Brousse	1,583	61.60
National and Democratic Union	Roxane Noat-Notari	1,543	60.04
National and Democratic Union	Edmond Aubert	1,530	59.53
National and Democratic Union	Max Principale	1,521	59.18
National and Democratic Union	Jean-Charles Rey	1,496	58.21
National and Democratic Union	Henri Rey	1,486	57.82
National and Democratic Union	Jean-Louis Campora	1,476	57.43
National and Democratic Union	Charles Lorenzi	1,470	57.20
National and Democratic Union	Michel Boeri	1,468	57.12
National and Democratic Union	Jean-Jo Marquet	1,466	57.04
National and Democratic Union	Honorine Cornaglia-Rouffionac	1,439	55.99
National and Democratic Union	Raittier Boisson	1,424	55.41
National and Democratic Union	Émile Gaziello	1,422	55.33
National and Democratic Union	Pierre Crovetto	1,412	54.94
National and Democratic Union	Guy Magnan	1,326	51.60
National and Democratic Union	Raymond Franzi	1,316	51.21
Democratic Union Movement	Charles Soccal	1,181	45.95
Monegasque Socialist Party	Gérard Porasso	1,059	41.21
Monegasque Socialist Party	René Giordano	1,057	41.13
Democratic Union Movement	Fabrice Barral	846	32.92
Independent	Baptiste Marsan	734	28.56
Total		31,517	100.00
Valid votes		2,570	94.52
Invalid votes		129	4.74
Blank votes		20	0.74
Total votes		2,719	100.00
Registered voters/turnout		3,647	74.55
Source: Journal de Monaco
