= 2013 Monegasque general election =

- 10 February 2013
- All 24 seats in the National Council; 13 seats needed for a majority
| Party | Leader | Vote % | Seats | +/– |
|---|---|---|---|---|
| Horizon Monaco | Laurent Nouvion | 50.34 | 20 | New |
| UM | Jean-François Robillon | 38.99 | 3 | −18 |
| Renaissance | Jean-Michel Rapaire | 10.67 | 1 | New |
This lists parties that won seats. See the complete results below.
| President of the National Council before | President of the National Council after |
|---|---|
| Jean-François Robillon; UP | Laurent Nouvion; Rally & Issues |

General elections were held in Monaco on 10 February 2013. The result was a victory for the Horizon Monaco alliance, which won 20 of the 24 seats in the National Council.

== Electoral system ==
Voters can either choose a party list or choose candidates from various lists ("panachage") for the 24 seats. The 16 candidates with the most votes are elected (with the older candidate breaking possible ties in votes). The eight other seats are chosen from lists in accordance with the proportional representation system for parties that have at least five percent of votes.

== Parties ==
The election was contested by two alliances, Horizon Monaco and Union Monégasque, as well as Renaissance, a party whose candidates were all employees of SBM. Horizon Monaco was an alliance of Rassemblement et Enjeux, the Union for the Principality and Synergie Monegasque, whilst Union Monégasque consisted of the Union de Monégasques and the National Union for the Future of Monaco. A total of 72 candidates contested the election.

== Campaign ==
An unnamed official of the administration team said: "We have had three lists before, as in 2008, but they were never full. We must therefore revise certain aspects, such as the voting cards, where the 72 names must be listed." Renaissance said that it seeks achievable goals instead of new policies. The party said that is sought representation in parliament "to defend the interests of the SBM workers in Monaco." Horizon Monaco's leader Laurent Nouvion told Monaco Matin: "I am very calm. I am more determined than ever to secure the future of Monaco and its compatriots. I believe that our campaign has been clean and honest. We tried as hard as possible to connect to the Monegasque people and to respond to their concerns. This is the heart of our commitment. For me and my fellow candidates, this campaign has brought us even closer together and given us the sense of being a real team, just like a sports team....Adversity has strengethened our relationship." Union Monégasque's leader Jean-François Robillon said: "We have worked hard at this long campaign. We are here to make plans for the future, not to abuse our adversaries, frighten the population and create an atmosphere of hatred... This has been our goal throughout the campaign: we have sought to promote our programme while avoiding aggressive confrontation."

== Conduct ==
The Organization for Security and Co-operation in Europe was invited by Monaco's ambassador to OSCE and sent a team of four observers from four countries led by Poland's Konrad Olszewski. They arrived on 30 January and will depart on 13 February.

Buses and car parks were free of charge in order to encourage voter turnout.

== Results ==
An 18-metre screen broadcast the result at the only voting centre at Salle du Canto from 08:00 to 19:00, with the result expected between 4:00–4:30 the following day.

| Party | Votes | % | Seats | +/– |
|---|---|---|---|---|
| Horizon Monaco | 56,472 | 50.34 | 20 | +15 |
| Union Monégasque | 43,743 | 38.99 | 3 | –11 |
| Renaissance | 11,964 | 10.67 | 1 | New |
| Total | 112,179 | 100.00 | 24 | 0 |
| Valid votes | 4,861 | 95.63 | | |
| Invalid votes | 159 | 3.13 | | |
| Blank votes | 63 | 1.24 | | |
| Total votes | 5,083 | 100.00 | | |
| Registered voters/turnout | 6,825 | 74.48 | | |
Source: Journal de Monaco

=== By candidate ===
| Party | Candidates | Votes | Total party votes | % | Seats |
|---|---|---|---|---|---|
| Horizon Monaco | Jacques Rit | 2,514 | 56,472 | 50.34 | 20 |
| Horizon Monaco | Christophe Steiner | 2,484 | 56,472 | 50.34 | 20 |
| Horizon Monaco | Laurent Nouvion | 2,475 | 56,472 | 50.34 | 20 |
| Horizon Monaco | Marc Burini | 2,467 | 56,472 | 50.34 | 20 |
| Horizon Monaco | Cristophe Robino | 2,396 | 56,472 | 50.34 | 20 |
| Horizon Monaco | Thierry Poyet | 2,391 | 56,472 | 50.34 | 20 |
| Horizon Monaco | Caroline Rougaignon-Vernin | 2,370 | 56,472 | 50.34 | 20 |
| Horizon Monaco | Pierre Svara | 2,362 | 56,472 | 50.34 | 20 |
| Horizon Monaco | Philippe Clerissi | 2,361 | 56,472 | 50.34 | 20 |
| Horizon Monaco | Thierry Crovetto | 2,357 | 56,472 | 50.34 | 20 |
| Horizon Monaco | Jean-Charles Allavena | 2,348 | 56,472 | 50.34 | 20 |
| Horizon Monaco | Nathalie Amoratti-Blanc | 2,347 | 56,472 | 50.34 | 20 |
| Horizon Monaco | Valérie Rossi | 2,347 | 56,472 | 50.34 | 20 |
| Horizon Monaco | Béatrice Fresko-Rolfo | 2,346 | 56,472 | 50.34 | 20 |
| Horizon Monaco | Sophie Lavagna | 2,346 | 56,472 | 50.34 | 20 |
| Horizon Monaco | Claude Boisson | 2,345 | 56,472 | 50.34 | 20 |
| Horizon Monaco | Jean-Michel Cucchi | 2,341 | 56,472 | 50.34 | 20 |
| Horizon Monaco | Christian Barilaro | 2,320 | 56,472 | 50.34 | 20 |
| Horizon Monaco | Daniel Boeri | 2,296 | 56,472 | 50.34 | 20 |
| Horizon Monaco | Alain Ficini | 2,293 | 56,472 | 50.34 | 20 |
| Horizon Monaco | Cristophe Spiliotis-Saquet | 2,257 | 56,472 | 50.34 | 20 |
| Horizon Monaco | Dylian Antonioli-Peyronel | 2,240 | 56,472 | 50.34 | 20 |
| Horizon Monaco | Anne Poyard-Vatrican | 2,236 | 56,472 | 50.34 | 20 |
| Horizon Monaco | Yves Chaki | 2,233 | 56,472 | 50.34 | 20 |
| Union Monégasque | Jean-Louis Grinda | 1,971 | 43,743 | 38.99 | 3 |
| Union Monégasque | Jean-François Robillon | 1,968 | 43,743 | 38.99 | 3 |
| Union Monégasque | Bernard Pasquier | 1,941 | 43,743 | 38.99 | 3 |
| Union Monégasque | Michèle Dittlot | 1,935 | 43,743 | 38.99 | 3 |
| Union Monégasque | Fabrice Notari | 1,918 | 43,743 | 38.99 | 3 |
| Union Monégasque | Gérard Bertrand | 1,912 | 43,743 | 38.99 | 3 |
| Union Monégasque | Gilles Pages | 1,911 | 43,743 | 38.99 | 3 |
| Union Monégasque | Pascale Olivie-Dastakian | 1,867 | 43,743 | 38.99 | 3 |
| Union Monégasque | Valérie Bernard | 1,859 | 43,743 | 38.99 | 3 |
| Union Monégasque | Arnaud Giusti | 1,840 | 43,743 | 38.99 | 3 |
| Union Monégasque | Pierre Lorenzi | 1,836 | 43,743 | 38.99 | 3 |
| Union Monégasque | Jean-Charles Gardetto | 1,826 | 43,743 | 38.99 | 3 |
| Union Monégasque | Guillaume Rose | 1,815 | 43,743 | 38.99 | 3 |
| Union Monégasque | Alberte Escande | 1,795 | 43,743 | 38.99 | 3 |
| Union Monégasque | Raphaël Rigoli | 1,795 | 43,743 | 38.99 | 3 |
| Union Monégasque | Philippe Orecchia | 1,773 | 43,743 | 38.99 | 3 |
| Union Monégasque | Claude Cottalorda | 1,772 | 43,743 | 38.99 | 3 |
| Union Monégasque | Maurice De L'Arbre | 1,768 | 43,743 | 38.99 | 3 |
| Union Monégasque | Claude Cellario | 1,763 | 43,743 | 38.99 | 3 |
| Union Monégasque | Danielle Daumerie | 1,750 | 43,743 | 38.99 | 3 |
| Union Monégasque | Jocelyne Beraudo | 1,745 | 43,743 | 38.99 | 3 |
| Union Monégasque | Nicole Manzone-Saquet | 1,708 | 43,743 | 38.99 | 3 |
| Union Monégasque | Bernard Marquet | 1,644 | 43,743 | 38.99 | 3 |
| Union Monégasque | Roland Marquet | 1,631 | 43,743 | 38.99 | 3 |
| Renaissance | Eric Elena | 566 | 11,964 | 10.67 | 1 |
| Renaissance | Jean-Michel Rapaire | 548 | 11,964 | 10.67 | 1 |
| Renaissance | Rudy Tarditi | 533 | 11,964 | 10.67 | 1 |
| Renaissance | Thierry Raymond | 528 | 11,964 | 10.67 | 1 |
| Renaissance | Stéphane Lorenzi | 516 | 11,964 | 10.67 | 1 |
| Renaissance | Gilles Doria | 513 | 11,964 | 10.67 | 1 |
| Renaissance | Etienne Ruzic | 507 | 11,964 | 10.67 | 1 |
| Renaissance | Baise Devissi | 502 | 11,964 | 10.67 | 1 |
| Renaissance | Claude Savoca | 502 | 11,964 | 10.67 | 1 |
| Renaissance | Joël Soriano | 494 | 11,964 | 10.67 | 1 |
| Renaissance | Frédéric Almondo | 492 | 11,964 | 10.67 | 1 |
| Renaissance | Michaël Tubino | 492 | 11,964 | 10.67 | 1 |
| Renaissance | Cédric Capra | 491 | 11,964 | 10.67 | 1 |
| Renaissance | Jean-François Carpinelli | 489 | 11,964 | 10.67 | 1 |
| Renaissance | Philippe Barriera | 488 | 11,964 | 10.67 | 1 |
| Renaissance | Martial Socci | 486 | 11,964 | 10.67 | 1 |
| Renaissance | Pierre Rivetta | 485 | 11,964 | 10.67 | 1 |
| Renaissance | Jean-Christophe Caisson | 479 | 11,964 | 10.67 | 1 |
| Renaissance | Roland Caisson | 477 | 11,964 | 10.67 | 1 |
| Renaissance | Marc Carpinelli | 477 | 11,964 | 10.67 | 1 |
| Renaissance | Yann Lorenzi | 476 | 11,964 | 10.67 | 1 |
| Renaissance | Françoise Raimbert | 476 | 11,964 | 10.67 | 1 |
| Renaissance | Frédéric Basile | 474 | 11,964 | 10.67 | 1 |
| Renaissance | Georges Testa | 473 | 11,964 | 10.67 | 1 |
