= Anne Poyard-Vatrican =

Monegasque politician

Anne Poyard-Vatrican is a Monegasque politician. She has served as a Member of the National Council of Monaco and as president of the centrist Union for the Principality (UP) political party (2010–2012).

== Biography ==
Poyard-Vatrican lived outside of the Principality of Monaco for 13 years, returning in 1997.

Poyard-Vatrican was elected to the National Council of Monaco at the 2003 Monegasque general election. She was pregnant during her election campaign. In 2003, she also served as Rapporteur of the Committee on the Rights of Women and the Family.

Poyard-Vatrican was re-elected to the National Council of Monaco at the 2008 Monegasque general election. In 2010, Poyard-Vatrican was president of the Commission for Environment and the Living Environment.

On 25 March 2010, Poyard-Vatrican was elected as president of the Union for the Principality (UP) political party by the party executive committee. During her term as president she organized working committees on social issues, nationality and the civil service, and met with union leaders. She also supported the introduction of the electoral financing bill and introduced a resolution on the "adoption of good practices in the decommissioning of public land from the State." Poyard-Vatrican did not seek re-election as president of the UP. She was succeeded by Patrick Rinaldi in 2012.

== Other activities ==
She is a founder member of the Cordons de Vie Association which promotes work with stem cells; in 2025, she is the association's General Secretary.

In 2025, she is deputy director of Monegasque Cooperation for Development.
