= 1958 Monegasque general election =

- 19 January 1958
- All 18 seats in the National Council; 10 seats needed for a majority
Party	Leader	Seats
UND	Joseph Simon	11
END	Louis Aureglia-Cima	7
This lists parties that won seats. See the complete results below.
President of the National Council before	President of the National Council after
Louis Aureglia-Cima	Joseph Simon

General elections were held in Monaco on 19 January 1958. The result was a victory for the National Union of Independents, which won 11 of the 18 seats in the National Council.

== Electoral system ==
Voters can either choose a party list or choose candidates from various lists ("panachage") for the 18 seats. To be elected a candidate must receive a majority of valid votes. If the 18 seats are not filled in the first round, the remaining seats are elected in a second round by a simple majority.

== Results ==
Party	Votes	%	Seats
National Union of Independents			11
National Democratic Entente			7
Total			18
Valid votes	965	98.27	
Invalid/blank votes	17	1.73	
Total votes	982	100.00	
Registered voters/turnout	1,216	80.76	
Source: McHale, Journal de Monaco

=== First round ===
Candidate	Votes	%
Louis Aureglia	605	62.69
Louis Caravel	584	60.52
Émile Gaziello	578	59.90
Jean-Charles Rey	537	55.65
Jean-Joseph Marquet	528	54.72
Joseph Simon	521	53.99
Auguste Médecin	507	52.54
Roger Simon	495	51.30
Max Brousse	486	50.36
Joseph Fissore	474	49.12
Charles Campora	470	48.70
Jean Notari	467	48.39
Jean-Louis Médecin	465	48.19
Charles Bernasconi	463	47.98
Charles Sangiorgio	448	46.42
Jean-Eugène Lorenzi	447	46.32
Jean-Marie Notari	441	45.70
Antony Noghès	440	45.60
Paul Choinière	439	45.49
Georges Médecin	433	44.87
Philippe Sanita	412	42.69
Charles Palmaro	403	41.76
René Sangiorgio	403	41.76
François Marquet	392	40.62
Philippe Fontana	392	40.62
Louis Thibaut	384	39.79
René Clerissi	383	39.69
Max Principale	368	38.13
Edmond Laforest de Minotty	351	36.37
Charles-Maurice Crovetto	348	36.06
Robert Vermeulen	345	35.75
Paul Perrin-Jannè	340	35.23
Roger-Félix Médecin	337	34.92
Gaston Vuidet	314	32.54
José Curau	310	32.12
Gabriel Henriot	291	30.16
Charles Soccal	180	18.65
Louis Rey	77	7.98
Total	15,858	100.00
Valid votes	965	98.27
Invalid/blank votes	17	1.73
Total votes	982	100.00
Registered voters/turnout	1,216	80.76
Source: Journal de Monaco
