= Party Monegasque =

Political party in Monaco

Party Monegasque (Parti Monégasque) is a Monegasque political party that exists in a form of association. It was formed in 2006 by Christine Pasquier-Ciulla.

Parti Monégasque has a loose structure and looks more like a study circle with the emphasis not on the actual number of members, but on exchanging ideas. The party has one representative on the National Council, Christine Pasquier-Ciulla, and around 30-50 supporters and sympathizers.
