= 1950 Monegasque general election =

General elections were held in Monaco on 8 January 1950 with a second round on 15 January 1950 to elect the 18 members of the National Council.

== Electoral system ==
Voters can either choose a party list or choose candidates from various lists ("panachage") for the 18 seats. To be elected a candidate must receive a majority of valid votes. If the 18 seats are not filled in the first round, the remaining seats are elected in a second round by a simple majority.

== Results ==
=== First round ===
Candidate	Votes	%
Louis Auréglia	562	77.41
Jean-Charles Rey	514	70.80
Robert Campana	493	67.91
Joseph Fissore	445	61.29
Roger-Félix Médecin	438	60.33
Robert Boisson	435	59.92
Jean Notari	413	56.89
Auguste Médecin	411	56.61
Roger Simon	401	55.23
Auguste Settimo	395	54.41
Joseph Simon	381	52.48
François Marquet	356	49.04
Étienne Boéri	349	48.07
Roger Orecchia	347	47.80
Michel Auréglia	338	46.56
Alfred Romagnan-Chiabaut	338	46.56
Robert Marchisio	329	45.32
Émile Gaziello	309	42.56
Marcel Médecin	307	42.29
Jean Gastaud	298	41.05
J. Charles Bernasconi	240	33.06
Robert Sanmori	221	30.44
Félix Bosan	195	26.86
Charles Bernasconi	190	26.17
Charles Soccal	187	25.76
Jean Sbarrato	174	23.97
Guy Brousse	170	23.42
Joseph Bertrand	165	22.73
Henri-Aimé Crovetto	103	14.19
Antoine Scotto	94	12.95
Georges Sangiorgio	91	12.53
Julien Médecin	91	12.53
François Scotto	81	11.16
Henry-Edmond Crovetto	78	10.74
Gaston Olivié	77	10.61
François Devissi	71	9.78
Félix Grinda	67	9.23
Camille Onda	66	9.09
Albert Devissi	64	8.82
Paul Scotto	64	8.82
Albert Giordano	22	3.03
Joseph Médecin	19	2.62
Joseph-Félix Crovetto	15	2.07
Joseph Giordano	5	0.69
Total	10,409	100.00
Valid votes	726	98.64
Invalid/blank votes	10	1.36
Total votes	736	100.00
Registered voters/turnout	923	79.74
Source: Journal de Monaco

=== Second round ===
Candidate	Votes	%
Jean Gastaud	408	58.20
Émile Gaziello	356	50.78
Michel Aureglia	328	46.79
François Marquet	309	44.08
Roger Orecchia	300	42.80
Étienne Boeri	282	40.23
Charles Campora	277	39.51
André Passeron	271	38.66
Alfred Romagnan-Chiabaut	263	37.52
Robert Sanmori	206	29.39
Jean Sbarrato	168	23.97
Guy Brousse	159	22.68
Félix Bosan	157	22.40
Charles Soccal	154	21.97
Mario Scotto	112	15.98
Crovetto Henri-Aimé	105	14.98
Joseph Médecin	65	9.27
Camille Onda	51	7.28
Total	3,971	100.00
Valid votes	701	100.00
Invalid/blank votes	0	0.00
Total votes	701	100.00
Registered voters/turnout	923	75.95
Source: Journal de Monaco
