= 1929 Monegasque general election =

General election were held in Monaco on 16 June 1929 to elect the 12 members of the National Council. The national councilmen were elected by a 30-member Electoral College.

== Electoral College ==
The 30-member Electoral College consisted of nine members elected by the Communal Council and 21 members elected by voters. The Electoral College also includes three substitute members elected by the Communal Council and six substitute members elected by voters.

=== Members elected by Communal Council ===
The Communal Council held an election for nine members and three substitute members of the Electoral College on 23 May 1929.

	Candidates	Votes
Members	Félix Bonaventure	13
Members	Étienne Crovetto	13
Members	François Devissi	13
Members	Honoré Bellando	13
Members	Charles Bernasconi	13
Members	Paul Cioco	13
Members	Louis Rapaire	13
Members	François Scotto	13
Members	Joseph Simon	13
Substitute members	Henri Bonafede	13
Substitute members	Joseph Marquet	13
Substitute members	Pierre Vatrican	13
Voters		14
Registered voters		15

=== Members elected by voters ===
An election of the remaining 21 Electoral College members and six substitute members was held on 26 May 1929.

	Candidates	Votes
Members	Urbain Rué	480
Members	Joseph Médecin	478
Members	Marius Armita	477
Members	Jean Bonafede	477
Members	Jean Vatrican, d'Étienne	477
Members	Séraphin Olivié	476
Members	Jean Vatrican, de Charles	474
Members	Constant Barriera	473
Members	Robert Marchisio	472
Members	Jules Baud	471
Members	Jacqes Spadoni	471
Members	Charles Fischetti	469
Members	Marcel Ardisson	468
Members	Jules Cerruti	465
Members	Albert Pistonatto	465
Members	Louis Ellena	463
Members	Parfait Sanmori	463
Members	Antoine Icardi	457
Members	Victor Frolla	456
Members	Arthur Linetti	456
Members	Louis Nizza	449
Substitute members	Robert Boisson	475
Substitute members	Henri Médecin	474
Substitute members	Félix Gamba	461
Substitute members	Dominique Ravarino	458
Substitute members	François Riva	454
Substitute members	Eugène Projetti	451
Valid ballots		502
Invalid ballots		22
Total ballots		524
Registered voters		790

== National Council ==
Candidates	Votes
Eugène Marquet	30
Dr. Marsan	30
Dr. Étienne Boéri	30
Victor Bonaféde	30
Félix Bonaventure	29
Dr. Joseph Simon	29
Charles Bernasconi	28
Michel Fontana	27
Marcel Médecin	27
Antoine Orecchia	26
Henri Marquet	25
François Devissi	23
Voters	30
Registered voters	30
