= 1933 Monegasque general election =

General elections were held in Monaco on 16 July 1933 to elect the 12 members of the National Council. The national councilmen were elected by a 30-member Electoral College.

== Electoral College ==
The 30-member Electoral College consisted of nine members elected by the Communal Council and 21 members elected by voters. The Electoral College also includes three substitute members elected by the Communal Council and six substitute members elected by voters.

=== Members elected by Communal Council ===
The Communal Council held an election for nine members and three substitute members of the Electoral College on 24 June 1933.

	Candidates	Votes
Members	G. Sangiorgio	13
Members	Louis Auréglia	12
Members	Pierre Jioffredy	12
Members	Jacques Reymond	12
Members	Paul Bergeaud	12
Members	Louis Bellaudo	12
Members	J.-B. Gastaud	12
Members	Charles Bernasconi	12
Members	Eugène Marquet	12
Substitute members	Louis Settimo	13
Substitute members	Marcel Médecin	12
Substitute members	Victor Rigazzi	12
Voters		13
Registered voters		15

=== Members elected by voters ===
An election of the remaining 21 Electoral College members and six substitute members was held on 25 June 1933.

	Candidates	Votes
Members	Louis Auréglia	477
Members	Georges Jioffredy	473
Members	Henri Rapaire	473
Members	Jules Sangiorgio	471
Members	Joseph Boisson	470
Members	Eugène Marquet	470
Members	Auguste Médecin	470
Members	Henri Obvié	470
Members	Emmanuel Rué	469
Members	Jean Notari	465
Members	Henri Médecin	463
Members	François Fissore	463
Members	Emmanuel Caravel	461
Members	Joseph Berti	459
Members	Second Palmero	459
Members	Auguste Boin	458
Members	Louis Briano	458
Members	Jules Cerutti	455
Members	Laurent Campana	454
Members	Michel Porasso	454
Members	Parfait Sanmori	449
Substitute members	Roger Abel	466
Substitute members	Antoine Gazo	459
Substitute members	Albert Pistonatto	459
Substitute members	Charles Kroenlein	458
Substitute members	Emile Bianchi	457
Substitute members	Antoine Icardi	456
Valid ballots		494
Invalid ballots		5
Total ballots		499
Registered voters		823

== National Council ==
Candidate	Votes
Pierre Blanchy	30
Arthur Crovetto	30
Étienne Fautrier	30
Robert Marchisio	30
Eugène Marquet	30
Marcel Médecin	30
Henri Settimo	30
Louis Auréglia	29
Charles Bernasconi	29
Pierre Jioffredy	29
Jean Notari	29
Jacques Reymond	29
Voters	30
Registered voters	30
