= 1918 Monegasque general election =

General elections were held in Monaco on 19 May 1918 to elect the 12 members of the National Council. The national councilmen were elected by a 30-member Electoral College.

== Electoral College ==
The 30-member Electoral College consisted of nine members elected by the Communal Council and 21 members elected by voters. It also had substitute members elected by the Communal Council and six substitute members elected by voters.

=== Members elected by Communal Council ===
The Communal Council held an election for nine members and three substitute members of the Electoral College on 28 April 1918. Théophile Gastaud and César Settimo declined to accept the nomination as members of the Electoral College. César Settimo was elected as substitute members.

	Candidates	Votes
Members	Joseph Olivié	14
Members	Suffren Reymond	13
Members	Louis Aureglia	13
Members	Honoré Bellando	13
Members	Antoine Marsan	10
Members	Alexandre Médecin	9
Members	Henri Marquet	8
Members	Michel Fontana	8
Members	Séraphin Olivié	8
Members	Théophile Gastaud	8
Members	César Settimo	8
Substitute members	César Settimo	9
Substitute members	Paul Bergeaud	9
Substitute members	Pierre Jioffredy	8
Voters		15
Registered voters		15

=== Members elected by voters ===
An election of the remaining 21 Electoral College members and six substitute members was held on 28 April 1918.

	Candidates	Votes
Members	Fulbert Aureglia	485
Members	Adolphe Blanchy	476
Members	Eugène Marquet	473
Members	Jean Bonafède	471
Members	Louis Médecin	471
Members	Etienne Vatrican	471
Members	Louis Bellando de Castro	469
Members	Paul Cioco	461
Members	Louis Néri	461
Members	Henri Olivié	458
Members	Louis Rapaire	456
Members	Joseph Crovetto	454
Members	Maurice Gastaldi	444
Members	Second Armita	443
Members	Edouard Giordano	439
Members	Jean Marsan	438
Members	Clément Ciais	435
Members	François Fontana	432
Members	Eugène Marquet Jr.	430
Members	Joseph Raimbert	430
Members	Joseph Lorenzi	408
Substitute members	Albert Scotto	467
Substitute members	Charles Mullot	429
Substitute members	Joseph Bonafède	425
Substitute members	Henri Bergeaud	423
Substitute members	Baptistin Gastaud	420
Substitute members	Célestin Allavena	406
Valid ballots		495
Invalid ballots		2
Total ballots		497
Registered voters		627

== National Council ==
Candidates	Votes
Suffren Reymond	30
Louis Aureglia	29
Maurice Gastaldi	28
Louis de Castro	27
Jean Marsan	27
Henri Marquet	27
Paul Cioco	26
Alexandre Médecin	26
Eugène Marquet	24
François Médecin	24
Paul Marquet	19
Louis Neri	18
Théophile Gastaud	13
Michel Fontana	10
Séraphin Olivié	7
Joseph Olivié	6
Antoine Marsan	2
Honoré Bellando	1
Adolphe Blanchy	1
Charles Bernasconi	1
Pierre Jioffredy	1
