= 1968 Monegasque general election =

- 24 March 1968
- All 18 seats in the National Council; 10 seats needed for a majority
Party	Leader	Vote %	Seats	+/–
UND	August Médecin	89.19	18	+1
This lists parties that won seats. See the complete results below.
President of the National Council before	President of the National Council after
Joseph Simon; UND	August Médecin; UND

General elections were held in Monaco on 24 March 1968. The result was a victory for the National and Democratic Union, which won all 18 seats in the National Council.

== Electoral system ==
Voters can either choose a party list or choose candidates from various lists ("panachage") for the 18 seats. To be elected a candidate must receive a majority of valid votes. If the 18 seats are not filled in the first round, the remaining seats are elected in a second round by a simple majority.

== Results ==
Party	Votes	%	Seats	+/–
National and Democratic Union	26,184	89.19	18	+1
Democratic Union Movement	2,691	9.17	0	–1
Independents	482	1.64	0	–
Total	29,357	100.00	18	–
Valid votes	2,261	93.78		
Invalid votes	127	5.27		
Blank votes	23	0.95		
Total votes	2,411	100.00		
Registered voters/turnout	3,301	73.04		
Source: Nohlen & Stöver, Journal de Monaco

=== By candidate ===
Party	Candidate	Votes	%
National and Democratic Union	Louis Caravel	1,551	68.60
National and Democratic Union	Jean-Joseph Pastor	1,527	67.54
National and Democratic Union	Emile Gaziello	1,522	67.32
National and Democratic Union	Charles Campora	1,515	67.01
National and Democratic Union	Edmond Aubert	1,506	66.61
National and Democratic Union	Max Brousse	1,503	66.48
National and Democratic Union	Charles Lorenzi	1,495	66.12
National and Democratic Union	Jean-Charles Rey	1,487	65.77
National and Democratic Union	Jean Notari	1,478	65.37
National and Democratic Union	Auguste Médecin	1,477	65.33
National and Democratic Union	Jean-Louis Medecin	1,468	64.93
National and Democratic Union	Roxane Noat-Notari	1,448	64.04
National and Democratic Union	Pierre Crovetto	1,439	63.64
National and Democratic Union	Jean-Joseph Marquet	1,420	62.80
National and Democratic Union	Max Principale	1,390	61.48
National and Democratic Union	Henri Rey	1,366	60.42
National and Democratic Union	Edmond Laforest de Minotty	1,307	57.81
National and Democratic Union	André Vatrican	1,285	56.83
Democratic Union Movement	Charles Soccal	1,089	48.16
Democratic Union Movement	Jean-Francois Sbarrato	642	28.39
Democratic Union Movement	Claude Rosticher	491	21.72
Democratic Union Movement	Joseph Deri	469	20.74
Independent	Etienne Boeri	482	21.32
Total		29,357	100.00
Valid votes		2,261	93.78
Invalid votes		127	5.27
Blank votes		23	0.95
Total votes		2,411	100.00
Registered voters/turnout		3,301	73.04
Source: Journal de Monaco
