= Rally for the Monegasque Family =

Political party in Monaco

Rally for the Monegasque Family Rassemblement pour la Famille Monégasque
- Leader: Jacques Rit
- Founded: 1998
- Merged into: Horizon Monaco
- Headquarters: La Colle, Monaco
- Ideology: Nationalism; Monarchism
- Political position: Centre

Rally for the Monegasque Family (French: Rassemblement pour la Famille Monégasque), also known as Promotion of the Monegasque Family (French: Promotion de la Famille Monégasque) was a Royalist political party in the Principality of Monaco. Founded in 1998, as Rally for the Monegasque Family (RFM), and led by Jacques Rit, RFM joined the centrist coalition Union for Monaco (UM) in 2003. However, RFM and UM severed ties preceding the 2008 parliamentary elections, and RFM formed a center-right coalition Monaco Together (ME). Rit later joined Horizon Monaco in the 2013 Monegasque general election.
