= 1911 Monegasque general election =

Election in Monaco

General elections were held in Monaco on 23 April 1911 to elect the 21 members of the National Council. A total of 20 candidates participated in the election. Out of the 629 registered voters, 524 (or 83.3%) voters cast their ballots.

== Results ==
Candidate	Votes	%
Jean Marsan	435	83.02
Théophile Gastaud	434	82.82
Suffren Reymond	433	82.63
Antoine Marsan	431	82.25
Honoré Bellando	430	82.06
Théodore Gastaud	430	82.06
Jean Bonafede	427	81.49
François Crovetto	427	81.49
Alexandre Melin	426	81.30
Michel Fontana	421	80.34
Laurent Olivié	321	61.26
Eugène Marquet	415	79.20
Séraphin Olivié	414	79.01
Henri Médecin	413	78.82
André Notari	407	77.67
Jean Barral	406	77.48
Prince Louis	397	75.76
Georges Sangiorgio	391	74.62
Étienne Crovetto	390	74.43
Laurent Aimino	339	64.69
Total	8,187	100.00
Valid votes	524	100.00
Invalid/blank votes	0	0.00
Total votes	524	100.00
Registered voters/turnout	629	83.31
