= Monegasque Action =

Monegasque Action (French: Action Monégasque, AM) was a political alliance in Monaco.

== History ==
The alliance was established as a coalition of voters to support a communist candidate in the 1973 elections. It aimed to introduce younger people into politics in the principality, and was successful in having its candidate elected. It did not contest any further elections.
