= Jean-François Robillon =

Monegasque politician, writer and doctor

National Councillor
- In office 2003–2010
- Monarchs: Rainier III; Albert II

President of the National Council
- In office 2010–2013
- Monarch: Albert II
- Preceded by: Stéphane Valeri
- Succeeded by: Laurent Nouvion

National Councillor
- Incumbent
- Assumed office 2013
- Monarch: Albert II

Personal details
- Born: 27 May 1962 (age 63) Princess Grace Hospital, La Colle, Monaco
- Party: Union for the Principality (2003–2011); Union Monegasque (2011–present)

Jean-François Robillon (born 27 May 1962) is a Monegasque politician, writer and doctor, who is currently a National Councillor in Monaco. He previously served as President of the National Council; following the resignation of Stéphane Valeri, Robillon was elected the 11th President by a nineteen to three majority on 11 January 2010. However, in the 2013 parliamentary election, Robillon's coalition, Union Monegasque lost control of the National Council, and as such, Robillon lost his presidency.

Robillon specializes in Cardiovascular Pathology, and has either authored or co-authored thirty medical publications on this topic. He is an active member of Conseil de l'Ordre; the medical oversight commission in Monaco. Outside politics Robillon serves as a board member for both the Prince Albert II of Monaco Foundation, and the Association SHARE, which engages in improving education and health in developing countries.

In 2007, Prince Albert II presented him with the Order of Saint-Charles.
