= Nicole Manzone-Saquet =

Monegasque politician

Nicole Manzone-Saquet is a Monegasque politician and a president of the Union of Monegasque Women. From 2008 until 2013 Manzone-Saquet was a member of the National Council of Monaco from Union Monegasque (Union Des Monégasques).

== Career ==
Since 1988 Manzone-Saquet is a president of the Union of Monegasque Women (Union des Femmes Monégasques). She is a women's rights activist; however, she doesn't consider herself a feminist. Manzone-Saquet notes that such developments as the termination of pregnancy for medical reasons, divorce by mutual consent, parental leave and part-time work were achieved thank to the involvement of women in the National Council.

From 2008 until 2013 Manzone-Saquet was a member of the National Council of Monaco from Union Monegasque (Union Des Monégasques). She was the oldest female member of the National Council. Manzone-Saquet chaired the Commission on Women's and Family Rights. In 2011–2013, Manzone-Saquet was a Representative of Monaco in the Parliamentary Assembly of the Council of Europe.
