= Caroline Rougaignon-Vernin =

Monegasque politician

Member of the National Council
- In office 2013–2018
- Monarch: Albert II

Personal details
- Education: University of Paris

Caroline Rougaignon-Vernin is a Monégasque pharmacist and politician, who was a member of the National Council from 2013 to 2018.

== Career ==
She achieved a doctorate in pharmacology from the University of Paris in 1995, and is now president of the Monaco Pharmacy Council. In 2013, Rougaignon-Vernin was elected to the National Council, where she served during the 2013–18 parliament. In 2014, Rougaignon-Vernin was the vice-president of the Committee on Social Interests and Miscellaneous Affairs (CISAD), during which time she opposed remote work. From 2016 to 2018, Rougaignon-Vernin was responsible for work and employment in the National Council. That year, she was rapporteur of the ratification of amendment No. 6 to the Franco-Monegasque convention on social security related to remote work. In 2018, she supported creation of a cable car from La Turbie, France to Monaco.
