= Laurent Nouvion =

Monegasque politician (born 1968)

National Councillor
- In office 2008–2013
- Monarch: Albert II

President of the National Council
- In office 2013 – 27 April 2016
- Monarch: Albert II
- Preceded by: Jean-François Robillon
- Succeeded by: Christophe Steiner

Personal details
- Born: 25 March 1968 (age 58) Princess Grace Hospital, La Colle, Monaco
- Party: Rally & Issues, Horizon Monaco
- Spouse: Stephen Roberts

Laurent Nouvion (born 25 March 1968) is a Monegasque politician and attorney who was the President of the National Council in Monaco from 2013 to 2016. While a National Councillor, Nouvion led the opposition against Jean-François Robillon's ruling party, Union Monegasques. In the 2013 parliamentary election, Nouvion's coalition, Horizon Monaco won control of the National Council, and as such, Nouvion became the twelfth President of the National Council.
