= 1921 Swiss referendums =

Four referendums were held in Switzerland during 1921. The first two were held on 30 January on holding referendums on treaties that would be valid for at least 15 years and on abolishing the military judiciary. The treaty proposal was approved, whilst the abolishment of the military judiciary was rejected. The third and fourth were held on 22 May on add articles 37bis and 37ter on road traffic and aviation to the constitution, and on only adding article 37ter on aviation. Both were approved.

== Background ==
The referendums on treaties and the military judiciary were both popular initiatives, whilst the two on amending the constitution were both mandatory referendums. Both types required a double majority; a majority of the popular vote and majority of the cantons. The decision of each canton was based on the vote in that canton. Full cantons counted as one vote, whilst half cantons counted as half.

== Results ==
=== Referendums on treaties ===
Choice	Popular vote		Cantons		
Choice	Votes	%	Full	Half	Total
For	398,548	71.4	17	6	20
Against	160,004	28.6	2	0	2
Blank votes	48,783	–	–	–	–
Invalid votes	3,076	–	–	–	–
Total	610,411	100	19	6	22
Registered voters/turnout	967,289	63.1	–	–	–
Source: Nohlen & Stöver

=== Abolishment of the military judiciary ===
Choice	Popular vote		Cantons		
Choice	Votes	%	Full	Half	Total
For	198,696	33.6	3	0	3
Against	393,151	66.4	16	6	19
Blank votes	15,837	–	–	–	–
Invalid votes	2,727	–	–	–	–
Total	610,411	100	19	6	22
Registered voters/turnout	967,289	63.1	–	–	–
Source: Nohlen & Stöver

=== Addition of articles 37bis and 37ter to the constitution ===
Choice	Popular vote		Cantons		
Choice	Votes	%	Full	Half	Total
For	206,297	59.8	14	3	15.5
Against	138,876	40.2	5	3	6.5
Blank votes	27,957	–	–	–	–
Invalid votes	791	–	–	–	–
Total	373,921	100	19	6	22
Registered voters/turnout	969,522	38.6	–	–	–
Source: Nohlen & Stöver

=== Addition of article 37ter to the constitution ===
Choice	Popular vote		Cantons		
Choice	Votes	%	Full	Half	Total
For	210,447	62.2	18	5	20.5
Against	127,943	37.8	1	1	1.5
Blank votes	32,859	–	–	–	–
Invalid votes	8938	–	–	–	–
Total	373,187	100	19	6	22
Registered voters/turnout	969,522	38.4	–	–	–
Source: Nohlen & Stöver
