= Association of Radicals for the United States of Europe =

Association of Radicals for the United States of Europe Asociace radikálů za Spojené státy evropské
- Leader: Richard Stockar
- Founded: 6 June 1990; 35 years ago
- Dissolved: 2 December 2003; 22 years ago
- Ideology: Liberalism; Radicalism; European federalism
- Political position: Centre

The Association of Radicals for the United States of Europe (Czech: Asociace radikálů za Spojené státy evropské) was a radical liberal political party in the Czech Republic, which existed between 1990 and 2003. The party sought to create a United States of Europe. It was founded by Richard Stockar after the Velvet Revolution in Czechoslovakia.
