= New Country (Armenia) =

- Leader: Artashes Tumanyan
- Founded: 2006
- Headquarters: Yerevan
- Ideology: Pro-Europeanism
- Political position: Centre

New Country (Armenian: Նոր Երկիր; Nor Yerkir) was a political party in Armenia. It was created by Artashes Tumanyan, Chief of staff to former President Robert Kocharyan.

== History ==
Artashes Tumanyan participated in the 2003 Armenian parliamentary election under the Armenian Revolutionary Federation's (ARF) proportional list. Tumanyan later established the New Country party and there was speculation that New Country could form a political alliance with the ARF. However, Robert Kocharyan was opposed to any cooperation between the two parties.

The party had intentions to participate in future elections and had scheduled its founding congress for 18 March 2006. However, on 16 March 2006, Tumanyan announced that he no longer would be an active member of the newly established party. As such, the party dissolved and had not participated in any elections.

Despite the set back, Robert Poladyan, a member of New Country was tasked with continuing the objectives of the party as an organization under the same name, instead of a political party.

== Ideology ==
In February 2006, the party published a lengthy manifesto in three of Armenia's major newspapers. The party pledged to strive for the country's democratization and economic liberalization. The party had also set the ambitious goal of attaining Armenia's membership and accession to the European Union by 2015.

Tumanyan had stated that the "European Union is a unique institution, which promotes the identity and diversity of nations," while promoting Armenia's European integration during a press interview.

The party also supported the strengthening of democracy, freedoms and rights of every citizen, and a free media.

== See also ==
- Politics of Armenia
- Programs of political parties in Armenia
