= Rescue and Partnership Party =

Jordanian political party

Rescue and Partnership حزب الشراكة والانقاذ
- Leader: Salem Al Falahat (Secretary General)
- Founded: 2017
- Headquarters: Amman
- Political position: Centre

Website
- https://sharakajo.com/

Rescue and Partnership Party is a centrist political party in Jordan founded in late 2017. Its members split off from the Muslim Brotherhood's Islamic Action Front. The Party does not call for an Islamic state.
