= Lebanese Peace Party =

Lebanese Peace Party حزب السلام اللبناني
- Abbreviation: LPP
- Chairperson: Roger Edde
- Founded: July 12, 2006
- Headquarters: Byblos, Lebanon
- Ideology: Centrism; Decentralization; Big tent
- National affiliation: March 14 Alliance
- Parliament of Lebanon: 0 / 128

Website
- assalamparty.com

The Lebanese Peace Party (Arabic: حزب السلام اللبناني Hizb Al-Salam Al-Lubnany) is a centrist Lebanese political party, which was founded on 12 July 2006 by Mr. Roger Edde, a businessman from the city of Byblos in Mount Lebanon, alongside other wealthy businessmen and intellects. Edde serves as the leader of the party.

It promotes itself as a secular centrist force with emphasis on issues related to privatization, decentralization and socio-economic priorities.

The Lebanese Peace party's main headquarters is located in Byblos and enjoys reasonable support in that region.

The party is currently allied to the Lebanese Forces and Kataeb Party and is part of the March 14 Alliance.

It has no members in the Lebanese Parliament.

Yorgo Byeklo is the composer (lyrics & music) of the party anthem.
