= 1973 Monegasque general election =

- 4 February 1973 (first round); 11 February 1973 (second round)
- All 18 seats in the National Council; 10 seats needed for a majority
Party	Leader	Vote %	Seats	+/–
UND	August Médecin	61.92	16	−2
AM		33.08	1	New
MUD		3.59	1	+1
This lists parties that won seats. See the complete results below.
President of the National Council before	President of the National Council after
August Médecin; UND	August Médecin; UND

General elections were held in Monaco on 4 February 1973, with a second round of voting on 11 February. The result was a victory for the National and Democratic Union, which won 16 of the 18 seats in the National Council.

== Electoral system ==
Voters can either choose a party list or choose candidates from various lists ("panachage") for the 18 seats. To be elected a candidate must receive a majority of valid votes. If the 18 seats are not filled in the first round, the remaining seats are elected in a second round by a simple majority.

== Results ==
Party	First round			Second round			Total seats	+/–
Party	Votes	%	Seats	Votes	%	Seats	Total seats	+/–
National and Democratic Union	23,733	61.92	12	5,942	53.66	4	16	–2
Monegasque Action	12,677	33.08	0	5,131	46.34	1	1	New
Democratic Union Movement	1,377	3.59	1				1	+1
Independents	541	1.41	0				0	0
Total	38,328	100.00	13	11,073	100.00	5	18	0
Valid votes	2,547	97.25		2,393	97.08			
Invalid votes	66	2.52		64	2.60			
Blank votes	6	0.23		8	0.32			
Total votes	2,619	100.00		2,465	100.00			
Registered voters/turnout	3,398	77.07		3,400	72.50			
Source: Journal de Monaco, Nohlen & Stöver

=== By candidate ===
==== First round ====
Party	Candidate	Votes	%
National and Democratic Union	Jean-Joseph Pastor	1,431	56.18
National and Democratic Union	Max Brousse	1,430	56.14
National and Democratic Union	Maxime Principale	1,407	55.24
National and Democratic Union	Jean-Louis Campora	1,393	54.69
National and Democratic Union	Emile Gazicllo	1,386	54.42
National and Democratic Union	Jean Notari	1,355	53.20
National and Democratic Union	Jean-Charles Rey	1,347	52.89
National and Democratic Union	Edmond Aubert	1,345	52.81
National and Democratic Union	Roxane Noat-Notari	1,338	52.53
National and Democratic Union	Jean-Joseph Marquet	1,337	52.49
National and Democratic Union	Charles Lorenzi	1,332	52.30
National and Democratic Union	Pierre Crovetto	1,291	50.69
National and Democratic Union	Michel Boeri	1,258	49.39
National and Democratic Union	Auguste Médecin	1,257	49.35
National and Democratic Union	Raymond Franzi	1,251	49.12
National and Democratic Union	Edmond Laforest de Minotty	1,200	47.11
National and Democratic Union	Henry Rey	1,200	47.11
National and Democratic Union	Alain Vatrican	1,175	46.13
Monegasque Action	Jean-Eugène Lorenzi	1,218	47.82
Monegasque Action	Hélène Marquilly	886	34.79
Monegasque Action	Patrice Lorenzi	859	33.73
Monegasque Action	Bruno Blanchy	931	36.55
Monegasque Action	Jean-Pierre Devissi	747	29.33
Monegasque Action	René Giordano	721	28.31
Monegasque Action	Louis Costa	666	26.15
Monegasque Action	Joseph Deri	662	25.99
Monegasque Action	Ernest Pauli	659	25.87
Monegasque Action	Gérard Porasso	653	25.64
Monegasque Action	Louis Diato	641	25.17
Monegasque Action	Louis Beaujon	640	25.13
Monegasque Action	Daniel Raymond	603	23.67
Monegasque Action	Alain Castellini	586	23.01
Monegasque Action	Patrick Scotto	569	22.34
Monegasque Action	Louis Raimbert	554	21.75
Monegasque Action	Yvette Elena	545	21.40
Monegasque Action	Georges Ughes	537	21.08
Monegasque Action	Antoine Scotto	0	0.00
Democratic Union Movement	Charles Soccal	1,377	54.06
Independent	Baptiste Marsan	541	21.24
Total		38,328	100.00
Valid votes		2,547	97.25
Invalid votes		66	2.52
Blank votes		6	0.23
Total votes		2,619	100.00
Registered voters/turnout		3,398	77.07
Source: Journal de Monaco

==== Second round ====
Party	Candidate	Votes	%
National and Democratic Union	Raymond Franzi	1,228	51.32
National and Democratic Union	Michel Boeri	1,228	51.32
National and Democratic Union	Auguste Médecin	1,174	49.06
National and Democratic Union	Henry Rey	1,156	48.31
National and Democratic Union	Edmond Laforest de Minotty	1,156	48.31
Monegasque Action	Jean-Eugène Lorenzi	1,203	50.27
Monegasque Action	Hélène Marquilly	1,001	41.83
Monegasque Action	Patrice Lorenzi	991	41.41
Monegasque Action	René Giordano	976	40.79
Monegasque Action	Jean-Pierre Devissi	960	40.12
Total		11,073	100.00
Valid votes		2,393	97.08
Invalid votes		64	2.60
Blank votes		8	0.32
Total votes		2,465	100.00
Registered voters/turnout		3,400	72.50
Source: Journal de Monaco
