= 1921 Monegasque general election =

General election were held in Monaco on 8 May 1921 to elect five members of the National Council. The national councilmen were elected by a 30-member Electoral College.

== Electoral College ==
The 30-member Electoral College consisted of nine members elected by the Communal Council and 21 members elected by voters. It also had substitute members elected by the Communal Council and six substitute members elected by voters.

=== Members elected by Communal Council ===
The Communal Council held an election for nine members and three substitute members of the Electoral College on 16 April 1921.

	Candidates	Votes
Members	Paul Bergeaud	14
Members	Michel Fontana	14
Members	Joseph Olivié	14
Members	Joseph Crovetto	14
Members	Théophile Gastaud	13
Members	Séraphin Olivié	13
Members	Georges Sangiorgio	13
Members	Honoré Bellando	13
Members	Albert Scotto	13
Substitute members	Baptistin Gastaud	14
Substitute members	Pierre Jioffredy	14
Substitute members	César Settimo	12
Voters		15
Registered voters		15

=== Members elected by voters ===
An election of the remaining 21 Electoral College members and six substitute members was held on 17 April 1921.

	Candidates	Votes
Members	Fulbert Auréglia	329
Members	Second Armita	326
Members	Étienne Crovetto	325
Members	Louis Médecin	321
Members	Jean Bonafède	320
Members	Henri Olivié	319
Members	Clément Ciais	318
Members	Adolphe Olivié	318
Members	Étienne Vatrican	318
Members	Adolphe Blanchy	317
Members	Auguste Gastaud	317
Members	Joseph Bonafède	316
Members	Louis Rapaire	315
Members	Joseph Raimbert	314
Members	Edouard Giordano	310
Members	Eugène Marquet Jr.	309
Members	Charles Mullot	308
Members	François Fontana	299
Members	François Devissi	298
Members	Joseph Lorenzi	291
Members	Célestin Allavena	273
Substitute members	Louis Bœuf	306
Substitute members	Henri Bergeaud	305
Substitute members	Ambroise Bonaventure	303
Substitute members	Charles Bernasconi	300
Substitute members	Jean Vatrican	297
Substitute members	Étienne Fautrier	261
Valid ballots		332
Invalid ballots		14
Total ballots		346
Registered voters		652

== National Council ==
Only 3 candidates received a majority of votes to be elected.

Candidates	Votes
Joseph Crovetto	20
Michel Fontana	19
François Devissi	18
Victor Bonafède	9
Charles Bernasconi	5
Marius Curti	5
Célestin Allavena	4
Étienne Fautrier	2
Joseph Olivier	1
Honoré Bellando	1
Pierre Jioffredy	1
Théophile Gastaud	1
Séraphin Olivié	1
Baptistin Gastaud	1
Albert Socal	1
Voters	30
Registered voters	30
