= Burundo-African Alliance for Salvation =

Political party in Burundi

The Burundo-African Alliance for Salvation (ABASA) is a small centrist, predominantly ethnic Tutsi political party in Burundi. It was founded by Terence Nsanze, the former Permanent Representative of Burundi to the United Nations in New York City in 1993. In 2005 Burundo-African Alliance for Salvation (ABASA) got 1 seat during the national elections in Africa. But on May 24, 2010 ABASA received just 26 votes and could not get seats.
