= Algerian National Party =

Political party in Algeria

The Algerian National Party or ANP is an Algerian political party formed after the end of the state of siege on March 19, 2011, and the enactment of the organic law on political parties. The first political party to emerge after enactment, the party was born of the work of the constituent congress of Oran. The status and rules of procedure of the ANP National Council were adopted by nearly 900 delegates from 21 wilayas of the country. During this congress, Youcef Hamidi was elected party chairman. The Algerian National Party was authorized on March 18, 2012.

It’s a centrist party and draws its roots in nationalism.

== Program ==
In education, the party advocates the creation of a National High Council of Education to correct imperfections which in his line, undermined Algeria's schools become an experimentation testing ground. This council would consist of executives and scientific skills that would have the task of promoting the sector of education and teaching, and promote the obtaining of an educational product quality. Towards the youth, he defended a replacement of the National Support Agency for youth employment (ANSEJ) through the creation of investment banks who do not practice usury and according to the specificities of each region. In management, the party advocates a modernization of the administration through the establishment of e-governance. In economic matters, the party wants to support domestic investment and revision of the tax system and massive investment by exploiting the wealth of each region of the country. If health must be radically recast, the party advocates multiple social measures: the introduction of premiums for pregnancy, childbirth and breastfeeding, lowering the retirement age of 60 to 57 years. The party proposes a constitutional reform the Constitutional Council would be replaced by a Constitutional Court which could include thirteen members instead of twelve and where the outgoing president there would be officially member. The party also proposes limiting the parliamentary mandate in two, the formalization of the Tamazight language, the constitutionalisation of the National Liberation Front (FLN) and the martyr as heritage and symbols of the nation, consecration and preservation of rights citizens, support of vulnerable segments of society, including assistance to minors without guardians, the homeless (SDF) and those without resources. The party wants the establishment of a semi-presidential system. Finally, the party proposes a law criminalizing French colonialism: "We do not accept apology from the French authorities nor repentance. We ask the Member of Parliament and senators to pass a law criminalizing French colonialism in Algeria. No one can close our eyes and we must call things by their name: a war crime is a war crime, a murder is a murder and genocide is genocide."

== Political action ==
The Algerian National Party submitted lists in 35 wilayas in the parliamentary elections of 10 May 2015 and the representation of women has exceeded the 60%. According to its president, the "national political field deserves positive investments in skills, namely through the involvement of women to actively participate in building the country, in the spirit of the Constitution Algerian which enshrines gender equality. »
