= Christophe Steiner =

Monegasque banker and politician

President of the National Council
- In office 2016–2018
- Preceded by: Laurent Nouvion
- Succeeded by: Stéphane Valeri

Personal details
- Born: 29 December 1958 (age 67) Monaco
- Party: New Majority
- Children: 3
- Occupation: Banker, politician

Christophe Steiner (born 29 December 1958) is a Monegasque banker and politician. He worked for Merrill Lynch from 1991 to 2000. He served as the vice president of the National Council from 2013 to 2016, and he has served as its president from 2016 to 2018, as a member of the New Majority.
