= National Union for the Future of Monaco =

Political party in Monaco

The National Union for the Future of Monaco (Union nationale pour l'Avenir de Monaco) was a centrist political party in Monaco. It ran as a part of the Union Monégasque list.

In 2013, National Union for the future of Monaco and Union of Monegasques formed a political group Union Monégasque. In the 2013 legislative elections, as a member of the Union Monégasque, the alliance won 38.99% of the popular vote and 3 out of 24 seats.

In the 2018 legislative elections, Union Monégasque won 16.2 percent of the vote and 1 seat.

In the 2023 legislative elections, Union Monégasque ran as a part of Monegasque National Union list.
