= 1963 Monegasque general election =

- 25 February 1963 (first round); 3 March 1963 (second round)
- All 18 seats in the National Council; 10 seats needed for a majority
Party	Leader	Seats	+/–
UND	Joseph Simon	17	−1
MUD		1	New
This lists parties that won seats. See the complete results below.
President of the National Council before	President of the National Council after
Joseph Simon; UND	Joseph Simon; UND

General elections were held in Monaco on 25 February and 3 March 1963. The elections were the first since the promulgation of a new constitution implemented after Prince Rainier III relinquished his absolute rule over the principality, and the first in which women were permitted to vote. The result was a victory for the National and Democratic Union, which won 17 of the 18 seats in the National Council.

== Electoral system ==
Voters can either choose a party list or choose candidates from various lists ("panachage") for the 18 seats. To be elected a candidate must receive a majority of valid votes. If the 18 seats are not filled in the first round, the remaining seats are elected in a second round by a simple majority.

== Results ==
Sixteen seats were won in the first round, with two decided in the second.

Party	First round			Second round			Total seats	+/–
Party	Votes	%	Seats	Votes	%	Seats	Total seats	+/–
National and Democratic Union			16			1	17	–1
Democratic Union Movement						1	1	+1
Total			16			2	18	0
Valid votes	2,240	94.44		1,964	97.66			
Invalid/blank votes	132	5.56		47	2.34			
Total votes	2,372	100.00		2,011	100.00			
Registered voters/turnout	3,096	76.61		3,097	64.93			
Source: Journal de Monaco, Nohlen & Stöver

=== First round ===
Candidate	Votes	%
Louis Aureglia	1,796	80.18
Jean-Charles Rey	1,658	74.02
Louis Caravel	1,530	68.30
Jean-Joseph Marquet	1,505	67.19
Max Brousse	1,497	66.83
Joseph Simon	1,472	65.71
Roxane Noat-Notari	1,469	65.58
Emile Gaziello	1,461	65.22
Auguste Medecin	1,456	65.00
Charles Campora	1,453	64.87
Charles Bernasconi	1,450	64.73
Jean Notari	1,430	63.84
Jean-Louis Medecin	1,381	61.65
Joseph Fissore	1,323	59.06
Paul Choinière	1,284	57.32
Max Principale	1,242	55.45
Edmond Laforest de Minotty	1,085	48.44
Jacques Sangiorgio	1,034	46.16
Charles Soccal	875	39.06
Jean-Charles Lorenzi	736	32.86
Edmond Aubert	693	30.94
René Clerissi	692	30.89
Pierre Crovetto	674	30.09
André Passeron	568	25.36
Jean Sbarrato	562	25.09
René Stefanelli	554	24.73
Georges Medecin	545	24.33
Bernard Medecin	409	18.26
Camille Onda	344	15.36
Jean Gastaud Mercury	167	7.46
Total	32,345	100.00
Valid votes	2,240	94.44
Invalid/blank votes	132	5.56
Total votes	2,372	100.00
Registered voters/turnout	3,096	76.61
Source: Journal de Monaco

=== Second round ===
Candidate	Votes	%
Charles Soccal	961	48.93
Edmond Laforest de Minotty	634	32.28
Charles Lorenzi	572	29.12
Jacques Sangiorgio	566	28.82
Pierre Crovetto	461	23.47
Roger Félix Medicin	265	13.49
Total	3,459	100.00
Valid votes	1,964	97.66
Invalid/blank votes	47	2.34
Total votes	2,011	100.00
Registered voters/turnout	3,097	64.93
Source: Journal de Monaco
