= Union of Trade Unions of Monaco =

National trade union center

USM
- Union of Monaco Trade Unions
- Union des Syndicats de Monaco
- Founded: 1944; 82 years ago
- Headquarters: Monaco
- Location: Monaco
- Affiliations: WFTU
- Website: usm.mc

The Union of Monaco Trade Unions (USM) is a national trade union center in Monaco. The USM is affiliated with the World Federation of Trade Unions.
