= Jacques Rit =

Monegasque politician

- Born: July 19, 1949 (age 77); Monaco
- Occupations: Orthopedist, politician
- Political party: Horizon Monaco
- Children: 3

Jacques Rit (born 1949) is a former politician and orthopedist. He served as a member of the National Council until the dissolution of the National Council of the 5th of February - in which he decided not to stand. Following the COVID-19 Pandemic, Rit was made the President of the Special Commission for the Analysis of the COVID-19 Crisis.
