= Rally & Issues =

Political party in Monaco

Rally & Issues Rassemblement & Enjeux
- Leader: Jean-Charles Allavena
- Founded: 1962
- Dissolved: c. 2020
- Merger of: National Union of Independents; National Democratic Entente
- Membership: 500 (2013)
- Ideology: Conservatism; Fiscal conservatism Monarchism
- Political position: Right-wing
- National affiliation: Horizon Monaco
- Colours: Red, grey

Website
- www.rassemblement-enjeux.org (usurped); Archived copy

Rally & Issues (French: Rassemblement & Enjeux) was a conservative political party in the Principality of Monaco. The party was the main party in the coalition Horizon Monaco after the 2013 Monegasque general election.

== History ==
The party was established as the National and Democratic Union (Union Nationale et Démocratique) in 1962 by a merger of the National Union of Independents and the National Democratic Entente, who between them held all 18 seats in the National Council. The new party won 17 of the 18 seats in the 1963 elections, and all 18 seats in the 1968 elections. It was reduced to 16 seats in 1973 as two opposition parties won seats, but won every seat again in the 1978, 1983 and 1988 elections.

In the 1993 elections it lost three seats, but retained a large majority. It won all 18 seats again in 1998, but the 2003 elections saw it win just three seats as it was defeated by the Union for Monaco alliance. It changed its name to Rally & Issues prior to the 2008 elections, and incorporated the Rally for Monaco as well as Values and Issues.

By 2013, the party had 500 members. That year, Jean-Charles Allavena replaced Laurent Nouvion as the leader of the party.

== Electoral history ==
=== National Council elections ===
Election	Votes	%	Seats	+/–	Position
1963			17 / 18	▼1	▲1st
1968	26,184		18 / 18	▲1	1st
1973			16 / 18	▼2	1st
1978			18 / 18	▲2	1st
1983			18 / 18	Steady	1st
1988			18 / 18	Steady	1st
1993			15 / 18	▼3	1st
1998	First round	67.4%	18 / 18	▲3	1st
1998	Second round	49.5%	18 / 18	▲3	1st
2003	42,892	41.5%	3 / 24	▼13	▼2nd
2008	41,512	40.5%	3 / 24	Steady	2nd
