= Michel Boeri =

Motor racing executive

- Occupation(s): President of the FIA's Senate and vice-president of the World Motor Sport Council
- Awards: Grand Officer of the Order of Grimaldi

Michel Boeri is the current president of the FIA's Senate and a vice-president of the World Motor Sport Council. He is also the president of the Automobile Club de Monaco and has held political places in Monaco's government.

At one time he was expected to succeed Jean-Marie Balestre as president of the FIA, but Max Mosley got the post instead.

On 24 June 2009, when the Formula One Teams Association and the FIA did a deal to solve their differences about the F1 championship, Michel Boeri replaced Max Mosley in his capacity relation with F1, a rumor that was later denied by Max Mosley.

Also he is the president of the Council of the Crown of the Principality of Monaco.

== Honours ==
- Grand Officer of the Order of Grimaldi (20 December 2022).
