= Horizon Monaco =

Political party in Monaco

- Abbreviation: HM
- Leader: Laurent Nouvion
- Founded: 2012
- Ideology: Conservatism; Euroscepticism; Monarchism
- Political position: Right-wing
- National affiliation: Monegasque National Union
- National Council: 8 / 24

Horizon Monaco was the ruling coalition of Monaco after the 2013 Monegasque general election, winning 20 of the 24 available seats in the National Council. The coalition, led by Laurent Nouvion, was composed mostly of the conservative Rally & Issues political party along with Synergie Monegasque and Union for the Principality. However, in 2016, many members defected to a new coalition, "New Majority", which became the new ruling coalition. In the 2018 election, it was transformed into an electoral list, which won two seats. Before 2023, it was represented in the National Council by Béatrice Fresko-Rolfo and Jacques Rit.

== Electoral history ==
=== National Council elections ===
Election	Leader	Votes	%	Seats	+/–	Position
2013	Laurent Nouvion	56,472	50.34	20 / 24	▲15	▲1st
2018	Laurent Nouvion	28,858	26.1	2 / 24	▼18	▼2nd
2023 (Note: Run as part of the Monegasque National Union coalition, which won 24 seats in total.)	Laurent Nouvion	72,602	89.6	8 / 24	▲6	▲1st
