= Union Monégasque =

Political party in Monaco

Monegasque Union Union monégasque
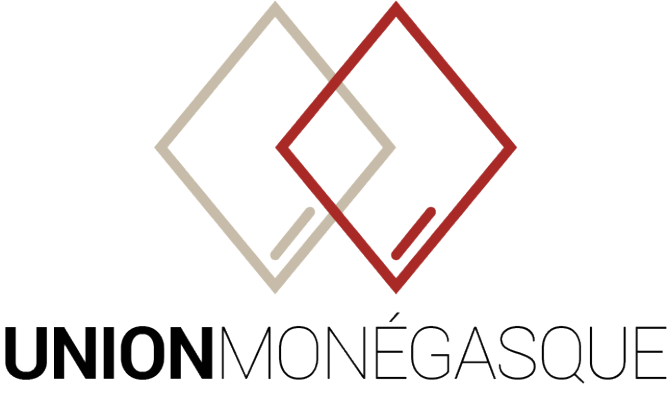
- Abbreviation: UM
- Leader: Jean-François Robillon
- Founded: 2003
- Merger of: National Union for the Future of Monaco; Rally for the Monegasque Family (left in 2008)
- Membership: 500 (2013)
- Ideology: Euroscepticism; Monarchism
- Political position: Centre
- National affiliation: Monegasque National Union
- Colours: Red; Black
- National Council: 3 / 24

Union Monégasque (UM; English: Monegasque Union; French pronunciation: [ynjɔ̃ mɔnegask]) is a centrist political party in the Principality of Monaco. Union Monégasque was formed in 2003 and is led by Jean-François Robillon. In the 2023 election it won 3 seats on the National Council as a part of the Monegasque National Union coalition.

Union Monégasque promotes and formulates political proposals aimed at bringing together the Monegasque population around common values according to the founding principles it has adopted. Pride, unity and ambition are the three founding pillars of the political group.

== Electoral history ==
=== National Council elections ===
Election	Votes	%	Seats	+/–	Position
2003	60,339	58.5	21 / 24	▲21	▲1st
2008	53,523	52.2	21 / 24	New	1st
2013	56,472	39.0	3 / 24	▼18	▼2nd
2018	17,895	16.2	1 / 24	▼2	▼3rd
2023 (Note: Run as part of the Monegasque National Union coalition, which won 24 seats in total.)	72,602	89.6	3 / 24	▲2	▲1st
