= Union for the Principality =

Political party in Monaco

The Union for the Principality (French: Union pour la Principauté, or UP) was a centrist political party in Monaco. It was part of the center-right coalition Horizon Monaco, which won 50.34% of the popular vote, and 20 out of 24 seats in the National Council at the 2013 general election.
