= National Council (Monaco) =

Parliament of Monaco

National Council Conseil national

Type
- Type: Unicameral

Leadership
- President: Thomas Brezzo, Priorité Monaco since 3 April 2024
- Vice President: Jean-Louis Grinda, UNM since 17 February 2023
- Majority Leader: Brigitte Boccone-Pagès, UNM; 5 February 2023

Structure
- Seats: 24
- Political groups: Majority (24): Monegasque National Union (24); Priorité Monaco (13); Horizon Monaco (8); Union Monégasque (3)

Elections
- Voting system: Plurality block voting (16); Party-list proportional representation with a 5% electoral threshold (8)
- Last election: 5 February 2023

Meeting place
- Monaco City

Website
- www.conseil-national.mc/index.php

The National Council (French: Conseil national; Monégasque: Cunsiyu naçiunale) is the unicameral parliament (legislative body) of the Principality of Monaco. Formed in 1911 after the Monégasque Revolution, the National Council initially had 12 members, increased to 18 in 1962 and 24 members since 2002, who are elected from lists by universal suffrage. The National Council is chaired by a president, who was initially appointed by the sovereign prince but has been elected by the National Council members since the year 1962. The current president of the National Council is Thomas Brezzo.

== History ==
The Monégasque Revolution of 1910 was a series of confrontations by the subjects of Monaco against their ruler, Prince Albert I. On 28 March 1910, Prince Albert I agreed to hold elections by universal suffrage for a parliament. This led to the end of absolute monarchy with the promulgation of the Constitution of Monaco on 7 January 1911. Elections were held for 12 members, with Prince Albert I retaining the right to appoint parliament's president. The inaugural meeting of the new parliament was on 3 May 1911.

The constitution was overhauled in 1962, which gave the National Council more power (including to elect the president of the chamber) and increased its membership to 18. Further changes were made to the constitution in 2002, further increasing the responsibility of the National Council and increasing its membership to 24.

== Description ==
The body is composed of twenty-four members, who are elected from lists by universal suffrage. Of those, 16 seats are assigned from a majority list and 8 seats are filled proportionally from lists that obtain more than 5% of the votes. Councillors serve for five-year terms, and though it may act independently of the Prince when debating legislation or the State Budget, the Prince shares mutual power between himself and the National Council. He may dissolve it at any time, provided that new elections be held within three months. To be eligible to vote, people must be at least 25 years old and hold citizenship.

The Council meets at least twice per year to vote on the country's budget and bills proposed by the prince's government. Ordinances (executive orders) are debated in the Council of Government, and once approved, must be submitted to the Prince within eighty days for his signature, which makes them legally enforceable. If he does not express opposition within ten days of submission, they become valid.

== Committees ==
- Finance and National Economy Commission
- Commission on Social Interests and Miscellaneous Affairs
- Legislation Commission
- Foreign Relations Commission
- Education, Youth and Sports Commission
- Housing Commission
- Commission on Women's Rights, Family and Equality
- Culture and Heritage Commission
- Environment and Quality of Life Commission
- Digital Development Commission
- Commission for Monitoring Negotiations with the European Union
- Commission for Monitoring the Constitutional Reserve Fund and Modernisation of Public Accounts
- Commission for the Amendment of the Rules of Procedure

== Leadership ==
=== Presidents ===
President	Party	Term	Elected	Ref.
Eugène Marquet		1911–1914	1911	
Dissolved by: Albert I
Eugène Marquet		1918–1928	1918; 1921	
Jean Marsan		1929	1929	
Eugène Marquet		1930		
Dissolved by: Louis II
Henri Settimo		1933–1944	1933	
Charles Bellando		1944–1950	1946	
Louis Aureglia-Cima		1950–1954	1950	
Joseph Simon		1954–1955		
Louis Aureglia-Cima		1955–1958	1955	
Joseph Simon	National Union of Independents	1958–1959	1958	
Dissolved by: Rainier III
Joseph Simon	National and Democratic Union	1962–1968	1963	
August Médecin	National and Democratic Union	1968–1978	1968; 1973	
Jean-Charles Rey	National and Democratic Union	1978–1993	1978; 1983; 1988	
Jean-Louis Campora	National and Democratic Union	1993–2003	1993; 1998	
Stéphane Valeri	Union for the Principality	2003–2010	2003; 2008	
Jean-François Robillon	Union Monégasque	2010–2013		
Laurent Nouvion	Rally & Issues	2013–2016	2013	
Christophe Steiner	Horizon Monaco	2016–2018		
Stéphane Valeri	Priorité Monaco	2018–2022	2018	
Brigitte Boccone-Pagès	Priorité Monaco	2022–2024	2023	
Thomas Brezzo	Priorité Monaco	2024–		

=== Vice Presidents ===
- Jean Marsan (1911, 1918, 1922)
- Roger-Félix Médecin (c. 1950–1952)
- Auguste Médecin (1952–1968)
- Jean Notari (1968–1978)
- Pierre Crovetto (1979–1993)
- Jean-Joseph Pastor (1993–2003)
- Claude Boisson (2003–2006)
- Bernard Marquet (2006–2010)
- Fabrice Notari (2010–2013)
- Christophe Steiner (2013–2016)
- Marc Burini (2016–2018)
- Brigitte Boccone-Pagès (2018–2022)
- Balthazar Seydoux (2022–2023)
- Jean-Louis Grinda (2023–present)

=== Majority leaders ===
- Joseph Simon (1963–1968)
- August Médecin (1968–1978)
- Jean-Charles Rey (1978–1993)
- Jean-Louis Campora (1993–2003)
- Stéphane Valeri (2003–2013)
- Laurent Nouvion (2013–2018)
- Stéphane Valeri (2018–2023)
- Brigitte Boccone-Pagès (2023–present)

=== Opposition leaders ===
- Charles Soccal (1963–1968)
- Jean-Eugène Lorenzi (1973–1978)
- Jean-Louis Médecin (1993–1998)
- Stéphane Valeri (1998–2003)
- Jean-Louis Campora (2003–2008)
- Laurent Nouvion (2008–2013)
- Jean-François Robillon (2013–2018)
- Béatrice Fresko-Rolfo (2018–2023)
- Laurent Nouvion (2023–present)

== See also ==
- List of current members of the National Council of Monaco
