= Panachage =

Variant of most open party list voting

Free list, vote pooling or panachage (English: /ˌpænəˈʃɑːʒ/, from French meaning "blend, mixture") is a method used in some systems of proportional representation where voters may freely support individual candidates across party lists, and these votes are pooled together by parties to allocate seats to party lists. From the perspective of the voters, this means multiple votes (more accurately, each voters single vote may contain multiple approvals or preferences), which they can split between individual candidates in different party lists. Seats are allocated to each party based on the number of votes for all of its candidates. Seats allocated to a party go to that party's most-popular candidates (assuming a fully open list).

The system is used in legislative elections for Liechtenstein, Luxembourg, Mauritius and Switzerland; in national elections in Ecuador, El Salvador, and Honduras; and in local elections in a majority of German states, in Czechia, Slovakia, and in French communes with under 1,000 inhabitants.

== Fictitious example ==
The North Staulsaw constituency in the Wafonian Republican Parliament elects six members using a fully open list. Three lists, containing twenty-two candidates in total, are vying for its seats. in this example, 40,500 votes are cast. The totals for each candidate and party are:

Election results
Social Democratic Party		National Consolidation Party		League of Concerned Citizens	
Candidate	Votes	Candidate	Votes	Candidate	Votes
Alice Brown	1,407	Janek Campbell-Pitt	4,662	Sylvia Ambrosetti	3,901
Matt Wright	3,901	David "D-Dog" Ng	4,195	Sam Miller	4,662
Pranav Kapoor	3,313	Allison Cook	3,901	Pat Malkiewicz	1,214
Judy Bogart	3,113	Tricia Chapman	5,873	Rick Vogelman	2,217
Thomas McLeish	3,213	Nikki Norrman	1,254	David Higgins	749
Maurice Vuong	2,725	Gene MacDonald	536	Duncan Bradshaw	328
Sean Stephens	1,867	John Smith	2,087	John Johnson	1
Megan Vargas	5,455	Raymond Sullivan	905	Jane Janeson	0
SDP Total	24,994	NCP Total	23,413	LCC Total	13,072

In the first step, seats are apportioned between the parties in according to their vote share. When using the D'Hondt method of rounding, the Social Democratic Party wins 3 seats, the NCP 2, and the LCC 1. (See highest averages method for further explanation.)

The SDP seats go to its most popular three candidates by vote tally: Megan Vargas, Matt Wright, and Pranav Kapoor. The NCP seats go to its top two candidates, Janek Campbell-Pitt and Tricia Chapman. The LCC seat goes to Sam Miller.

== By country ==
=== Argentina ===
From 1912 to 1948, and from 1958 and 1962, Argentine voters had the possibility of crossing out or adding candidates to the electoral lists of the legislative elections.

=== Austria ===
Panachage was used in Austria until the 1970s.

=== Belgium ===
Until the parliamentary elections of 1900, panachage was allowed in provincial and parliamentary elections in Belgium. Candidates were placed on lists in alphabetical order of surname.

Municipal elections were held under the panachage system starting in 1932 until passage of the 5 July 1976 Law. This change was adopted before the first elections (October 1976) following the 1976 communes merger, which reduced the number of Belgian communes from 2,359 to 596. Bills were introduced in 1995 and 1999 by senators from the Volksunie to reinstitute panachage, but they were never put to votes.

=== Ecuador ===
In the Ecuadorian parliamentary elections, voters have as many votes as there are seats to be filled. They may use their votes to support candidates across party lines (and they may also give several votes to a single candidate).

=== El Salvador ===
El Salvador adopted an open list proportional system for the 2012 legislative elections. It introduced panachage for the 2015 elections:

"For the first time, voters will be able to select individual candidates from any party rather than being forced to vote for a single party with an established list of candidates. Voters can still opt to simply choose a party."

=== France ===
Since 2014, voters in municipal elections in communes having fewer than 1,000 inhabitants (at the time: 26,879 communes, representing 73.5% of the total) have been able to cast ballot papers indicating their preference for candidates either listed or named individually, and, in addition, cross out if they so wish the names of one or more candidates. (Before that time, the upper population limit for communes qualified for this system of voting had been 3,500.) The number of candidates selected by a voter must not, however, exceed the total number of available seats.

Until a reform effective 17 May 2013, voters had been able to write in the names of other, unlisted eligible citizens. But now all nominations must be filed in advance with the prefecture or sub-prefecture, and voters may no longer add names on election day.

=== Germany ===
Of sixteen federal states, two (Bremen and Hamburg, both of which are city-states) have adopted electoral systems including panachage (Panaschieren) for state and municipal elections. Eleven others use the system only for municipal elections. Schleswig-Holstein uses SNTV to select candidates from lists, i.e. voters may only give one vote to a candidate they support. In all other states allowing panachage, voters may give more than one vote for one or several candidate(s) (cumulative voting). Berlin, North Rhine-Westphalia and Saarland do not use panachage.

=== Honduras ===
Panachage within an open list proportional system has been used since 2005 for legislative elections in Honduras.

=== Luxembourg ===
In all proportional elections, such as those for the Chamber of Deputies, a voter in Luxembourg has as many votes as there are seats to be filled in that constituency. The individual may vote either for candidates on the same list or for candidates on different lists and may allocate up to two votes to a single candidate.

=== Switzerland ===
In Switzerland, in addition to being able to distribute their votes between different lists, voters may add names to lists or delete one or more of the names appearing on others. Each candidate can be placed up to two times on the ballot paper. This practice is known as cumulative voting.
