= Céline Caron-Dagioni =

Monegasque politician (born 1972 or 1973)

Counsellor for Equipment, Environment, and Urban Planning of Monaco
- Incumbent
- Assumed office 1 September 2021
- Monarch: Albert II
- Prime Minister: Pierre Dartout; Didier Guillaume; Isabelle Berro-Amadeï (interim); Christophe Mirmand
- Preceded by: Marie-Pierre Gramaglia

Personal details
- Born: 1972 or 1973
- Education: Aix-Marseille University; IAE Lille; Staffordshire University

Céline Caron-Dagioni (born 1972 or 1973) is a Monegasque economist and politician. She has been serving as Counsellor for Equipment, Environment, and Urban Planning of Monaco since 2021.

== Career ==
Caron-Dagioni was born in 1972 or 1973. She graduated in economics with a specialisation in Business Management from the Aix-Marseille University and obtained a master's degree in Economics from the University of Applied Economics of Nice, both in France. In 1997, she obtained a postgraduate degree in international trade at the IAE Lille, France. She also holds a master of science degree from Staffordshire University in the United Kingdom.

Between 1997 and 2001, Caron-Dagioni worked at the automotive company Mecaplast in Monaco as a key account manager. In 2001 she began working into the public sector when was appointed head of the business creation division of the economic expansion department. Between 2001 and 2010, she was project manager in the tax services department. She subsequently served as Chief Secretary to the Department of External Relations and, between 2011 and 2012, as Secretary General of the Department of Health and Social Care. Between 2018 and 2021 was general secretary of the Institut océanographique.

In August 2021 Caron-Dagioni was appointed the new Counsellor of the Ministry of Equipment, Environment, and Urban Planning of Monaco and her term began on 1 September 2021, succeeding Marie-Pierre Gramaglia.

In May 2023 she announced environmental measures such as limiting the size of cruise ships calling at the port, mechanisms to preserve the port's marine biodiversity, and strengthening the social responsibility of tourism. That month, regulations came into force to regulate water consumption and ensure water reserves.

In 2024 announced the government's commitment to make Monaco carbon neutral by 2050 and a new mobility plan to improve public mobility within the country. In June 2025 she signed the France's Charter “Sustainable Mediterranean Cruising 2025”.
