= Privy council =

Body that advises the head of state

A privy council is a body that advises a head of state, typically, but not always, in the context of a monarchical government. The term "privy" (from French privé) signifies private or secret. Consequently, a privy council, more common in the past, existed as a group of a ruling monarch's most trusted court advisors. Its purpose was to consistently provide confidential advice on matters of state. Despite the abolition of monarchy, some privy councils remained operational, while others were individually disbanded, allowing the monarchical system to continue to exist without a secret crown council.

== Privy councils ==
=== Functioning privy councils ===
Government	Privy Council
Belgium	Crown Council of Belgium
Bhutan	Privy Council of Bhutan
Brunei Darussalam	Privy Council of Brunei
Cambodia	Supreme Privy Advisory Council
Canada	King's Privy Council for Canada
Denmark	Danish Council of State
Monaco	Crown Council of Monaco
Netherlands	Dutch Council of State
Norway	Norwegian Council of State
Thailand	Privy Council of Thailand
Tonga	Privy Council of Tonga
United Kingdom	His Majesty's Most Honourable Privy Council

=== Former or dormant privy councils ===
Monarchy	Privy Council	Notes
Austrian Empire/Austria-Hungary	Geheimrat	Abolished 1919
Bermuda	Privy Council of Bermuda	Split in 1888
Empire of Brazil	His Imperial Majesty's Council	Honorific title, some were part of the Council of Ministers or the Council of State; abolished by a coup in 1889
Konbaung dynasty (Burma)	Byedaik	Abolished 1885
Qing dynasty (China)	Grand Council	Abolished 1898
Kingdom of England	Privy Council of England	Replaced by the Privy Council of Great Britain on 1 May 1708
Ethiopian Empire	Crown Council of Ethiopia	Abolished 1974, revived in pretence 1987
Kingdom of France	Conseil du Roi	Abolished 1791 and replaced by the Conseil d'État
German Empire	Geheimrat	Abolished 1918
Kingdom of Greece	Council of State	Established in 1835; abolished in 1865, re-established in 1929 as the senior administrative court of Greece
Electorate of Hanover	Privy Council of Hanover	Abolished 1866
Kingdom of Hawaiʻi	Privy Council of the Hawaiian Kingdom	Abolished after the Hawaiʻi became a republic in 1893
Kingdom of Ireland	Privy Council of Ireland	Retained following the coming into effect of the Act of Union 1800, but became dormant from 1922
Empire of Japan	Privy Council of Japan	Abolished 1947
Kingdom of Laos	King's Council	Abolished 1975
Kingdom of Nepal	Rajsabha	Monarchy abolished on 28 May 2008
Habsburg Netherlands	Geheime Raad or Conseil Privé	Established in 1531. Abolished for the final time in 1794
Nguyễn dynasty (Vietnam)	Viện cơ mật	Abolished in 1945 with the abolition of the monarchy
Northern Ireland	Privy Council of Northern Ireland	Made dormant 1972
Ottoman Empire	Divan	Monarchy abolished in 1922
Kingdom of Portugal	His Most Faithful Majesty's Council	Monarchy abolished in 1910
Russian Empire	Supreme Privy Council	Abolished 1730
Electorate of Saxony	Privy Council of Saxony	Established in 1697 to administer jurisdiction over Lutheran institutions on behalf of the Elector who had converted to Catholicism
Kingdom of Scotland	Privy Council of Scotland	Abolished on 1 May 1708, replaced by the Privy Council of Great Britain
Sweden	Privy Council of Sweden	Abolished 1789
Kingdom of Yugoslavia	Privy Council of Yugoslavia	Abolished 1945, revived in pretence 1990 and replaced by the Privy Council of Serbia in 2006.
Sultanate of Sulu	Ruma Bichara (State Council)	Abolished after Spanish colonization of the Philippines

== See also ==
- Council of State
- Crown Council
- Executive Council (Commonwealth countries)
- Privy Council ministry
- State Council
