= Gramaglia =

Gramaglia is an Italian surname. Notable people with the surname include:

- Bruno Gramaglia (1919–2005), Italian footballer
- Marie-Pierre Gramaglia, Monagesque politician
- Mariella Gramaglia (1949–2014), Italian politician and feminist
- Paulina Gramaglia (born 2003), Argentine professional footballer
