= Journal de Monaco =

Government gazette of Monaco

- Journal de Monaco print edition on 24 December 1962
- Type: Weekly official bulletin
- Founded: 1858; 168 years ago
- Language: French
- Headquarters: Monaco-Ville, Monaco
- ISSN: 1010-8742
- OCLC number: 1043639846
- Website: journaldemonaco.gouv.mc

The Journal de Monaco (French pronunciation: [ʒuʁnal də mɔnako]), abbreviated JM, is the official bulletin of the Principality of Monaco.

== History ==
Originally titled L'Eden, the gazette was first published on 30 May 1858 by decree of Charles III. It was originally intended to promote the principality and attract tourists. The following year, its name was changed to the Journal de Monaco.

On 17 December 1962, it became the official bulletin of the principality. It is published weekly, on Fridays, and contains announcements and texts of laws and sovereign ordinances, which become legally binding one day after their publication In 1969, the bulletin had a circulation of 1,500.

The entire archive of the gazette, dating back to 1858, was made publicly accessible online in 2016.

== Notable decrees and announcements ==
- In July 2012, the bulletin published the sovereign ordinance that established the Monaco Health Screening Centre.
- In December 2012, the bulletin announced the appointment of Jean Castellini as the Counsellor of Finance and Economy of Monaco.
- In August 2021, the bulletin published a bill that mandated COVID-19 vaccines for healthcare workers.
- In May 2023, the bulletin announced water management regulations in response to the 2023 European drought.
- In July 2023, the bulletin published a sovereign ordinance outlining anti-corruption regulations for the Minister of State and the Council of Government.
- In October 2023, the bulletin announced the appointments of Stéphane Braconnier and José Martinez as the President and Vice-President of the Supreme Court of Monaco, respectively.
- In December 2024, the bulletin announced the appointment of Bruno Dalles as the director of the Monegasque Financial Security Authority.

== See also ==
- Constitution of Monaco
