= Crown Council =

Crown Council may refer to:

- Crown Council of Belgium, the King, his Ministers and the Ministers of State, meeting on rare occasions to advise the King
- Crown Council of Ethiopia, the constitutional body advising the reigning Emperors of Ethiopia or its successor, the non-governmental organization of royalists that now operates as a cultural and charitable institution
- Crown Council of Greece, an informal advisory body to the King of Greece
- Crown Council of Monaco, a seven-member administrative body meeting at least twice annually to advise the Prince of Monaco
- Crown Council of Romania, the constitutional body advising the reigning Kings of Romania

== Video games ==
- Crown and Council video game
