= Philippe Mettoux =

French government official (born 1958)

Personal details
- Born: September 5, 1958 (age 67)

Philippe Mettoux (born 5 September 1958) is a French government official who was the designated Minister of State of Monaco, and was set to assume office on 4 July 2025 before renouncing. He previously worked for SNCF and as a political advisor.

== Biography ==
Mettoux was born in 1958 He graduated from the University of Poitiers with a master's degree and later attended the French National School for the Judiciary. He began his career as a prosecutor in several French courts. In 2000, he became the head of the Directorate of Criminal Affairs and Pardons in the French Ministry of Justice, a position he served in for two years.

Afterwards, Mettoux worked in the Central Service for the Prevention of Corruption before becoming a political advisor. He advised Minister of Justice Dominique Perben and then Minister of the Interior and later Prime Minister Dominique de Villepin. He held the title of Advisor to the Prime Minister for Justice from 2005 to 2007. Afterwards, he joined the French Conseil d'État (Council of State). In 2013, he joined SNCF, where he served as legal and compliance director and internal mediator. He also served as the president of SNCF America as well as chairman of the board of directors from 2021.

On 4 June 2025, he was appointed by Albert II as the new Minister of State of Monaco, to assume office on 4 July, succeeding acting minister Isabelle Berro-Amadeï, who assumed office in January 2025 following the death of Didier Guillaume. On 26 June 2025, Mettoux gave up his tenure before assuming the office, because "negative and contrary forces at work to perpetuate the archaic practices of the past and prevent it from carrying out [his] mission".
