= Franck Biancheri (minister) =

Monégasque businessman and politician (born 1960)

Counsellor of Finance and Economy
- In office 2000–2006
- Monarchs: Rainier III; Albert II
- Preceded by: Henri Fissore
- Succeeded by: Gilles Tonelli

Personal details
- Born: 2 May 1960 (age 66)

Franck Biancheri (born 2 May 1960) is a Monégasque businessman and former foreign and finance minister of Monaco.

== Early life and education ==
Biancheri was born on 2 May 1960. He graduated from ESCP, Paris Business School.

== Career ==
Biancheri served as minister of finance and economy from 2000 until July 2006. He rejoined the Council of Government as the minister of foreign affairs from 2008 to 2011. He also served as Monaco’s economic development minister. He has been the CEO of Monaco QD Hotels and Resorts Management.
