= JM =

JM may refer to:

== People ==
- JM de Guzman (born 1988), Filipino actor, mixed martial artist, model and singer
- JM Yosures (born 1999), Filipino singer and recording artist

== Places ==
- Jamaica (ISO 3166-1 alpha-2 country code JM)
- Jay Em, Wyoming, a community in the United States

== Businesses and organizations ==
- Jack's Mannequin, a piano rock band
- Jama'at al-Jihad al-Islami, an Islamic terrorist group active in Central Asia
- Air Jamaica (1968-2015, IATA code JM)
- Jambojet (IATA code JM)
- Jaysh Muhammad, an Iraqi insurgency group
- Johns Manville, an American company that manufactures insulation and roofing materials
- Jerónimo Martins, a Portuguese company
- Johnson Matthey, a British chemicals and metals company
- Journal de Monaco, the official bulletin of Monaco
- Joseph Magnin Co.

== Other uses ==
- A shortened form of James
- Fender Jazzmaster, an American guitar model
- Juris Master, a degree similar to the Master of Laws
- Just Muslim, a religious denomination
- , the official symbol for the Musashino Line in Japan
