= India–Monaco relations =

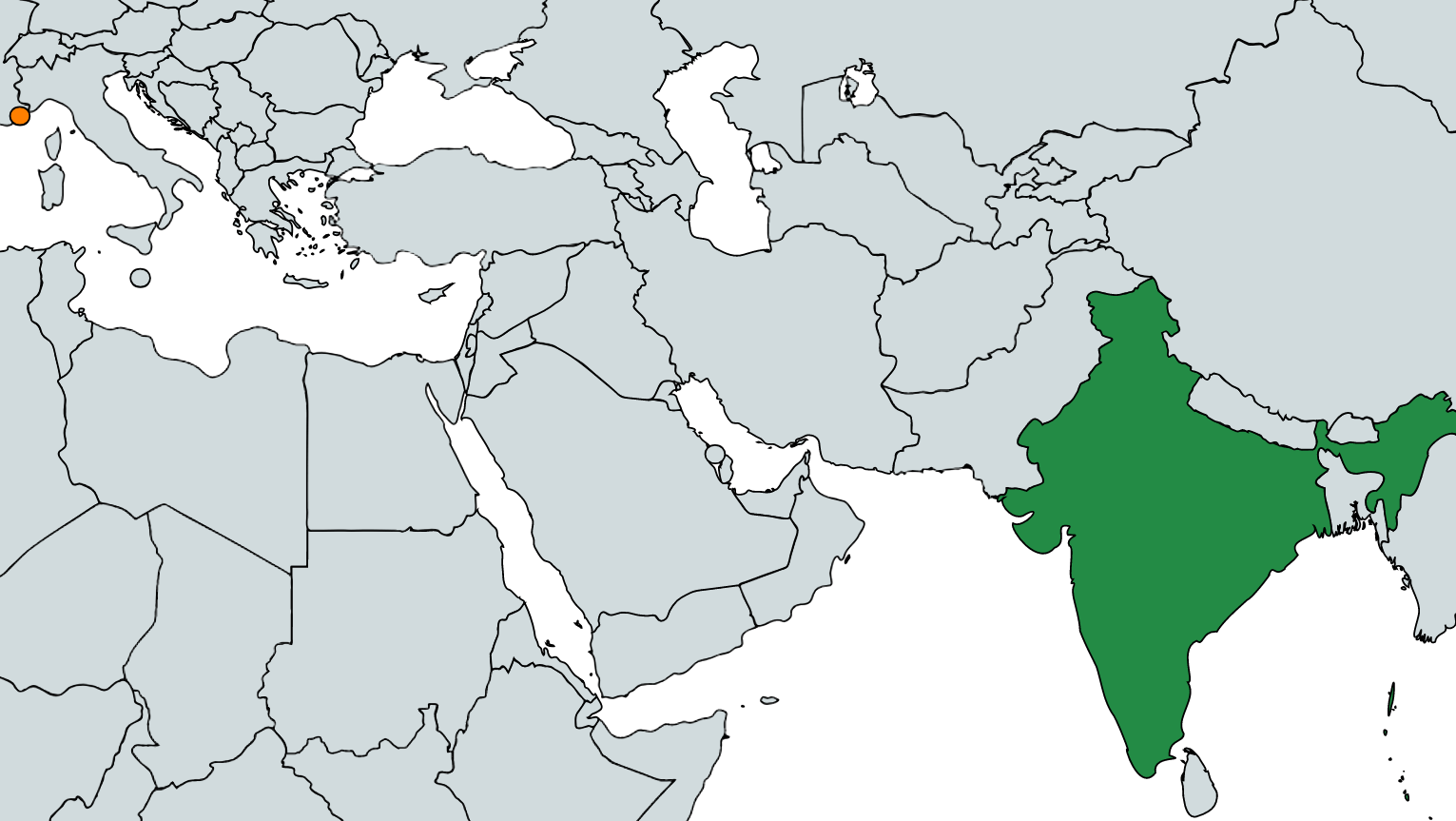
- India: Monaco

India–Monaco relations are the bilateral ties between Republic of India and Principality of Monaco. India is accredited to Monaco from its embassy in Paris, France. Monaco is accredited to India from its Department of External Relations in Monte Carlo.

== History ==
The Principality of Monaco and the Republic of India officially established relations on 21 September 2007 when Monaco opened an embassy in India, although the two nations have had Consular relations since 1954. India currently has no consular or diplomatic presence in Monaco, instead using its French Embassy to handle affairs. Rainier Imperti became the first ambassador to India in 2007 but was later succeeded by Marco Piccinini in 2008. Currently the Ambassador to India is Patrick Medicin.

== Economic trade ==
Indian tourists to Monaco combined spent over 14 billion dollars in Monaco. Over 33% of exports to India from Monaco are plastic or manufactured goods. Over 40% of imports to Monaco from India are textiles.

== Humanitarian aid ==
Monaco Aid Et Presence, a humanitarian charity, has maintained a presence in India since the 1980s and have opened Orphanages in India.

== Bilateral visits ==
- In 2009, Ranjan Mathai visited Monaco to discuss the visit of Albert II to India for the Commonwealth Games and the possibility of signing a TIEA
- In 2010, India's Minister of Tourism, Selja Kumari, visited Monaco
- Prince Albert II visited New Delhi for the 2010 Commonwealth Games from 1-6 October
- In 2012, S. S. Palanimanickam visited Monaco to sign a TIEA
