= Supreme Court of Monaco =

Highest court in Monaco

The Monegasque Supreme Court (French: Tribunal suprême) is the highest court of law in the city-state of Monaco for judicial appeals, administrative matters as well as ensuring the constitution of Monaco is upheld. It consists of three full judges and two assistant judges, appointed by the Prince of Monaco at the recommendation of the National Council of Monaco, the Crown Council, the Council of State, the Court of First Instance and the Court of Appeal. This is done in the ratio of one judge per institution. The Supreme Court was established in 1962 following the new constitution to guarantee fundamental liberties.

The members of the Supreme Court must be at least forty years old. In practice, they are French jurists, either professors of public law or members of the French Court of Cassation or Council of State.

== History ==
Monaco's Supreme Court was established by the constitution of January 5, 1911, granted by Prince Albert I following the Monegasque Revolution and prepared by internationally renowned French jurists and internationalists (including Louis Renault, André Weiss, Jules Roche). It is considered to be the oldest Constitutional Court in the world, thus preceding the Constitutional Court of Austria created by the Constitution of 1920.

Because of the World War I, the Supreme Court was not installed until 1919, after the conclusion of peace agreements with France. The first decision was rendered on April 3, 1925.

Until 1958, the jurisdiction of the Supreme Court was strictly constitutional. The high court could thus only rule on appeals having as their object an infringement of the rights and freedoms enshrined in Title III of the Constitution, under the conditions provided for in Article 14. However, an order of May 7, 1958 introduced an administrative litigation which allows the Court to rule on any “violation of the law or excess of power, by any person showing a direct and personal interest”. Since the ordinance-law of January 4, 1961, the Supreme Court rules sovereignly on appeals without having to refer them to the Prince.

The Constitution of December 17, 1962 establishes the independence of the Monegasque justice system and the jurisdiction of the Supreme Court. The sovereign ordinance of April 16, 1963, modified by the Sovereign Ordinances of April 14, 1980 and June 19, 2015, determine its organization and operation.

Since 1962, the Tribunal has experienced an extension and diversification of its contentious powers. Between 1925 and 1962 there were 28 decisions rendered, between 1962 and 1999 their number grew to 79.

Despite several reforms, the court does not have the power to issue injunctions against the state. It receives about fifteen appeals per year.

=== Recommendations of the Council of Europe ===
In July 2017, during its 4th evaluation cycle, the Council of Europe and the Group of States against Corruption (GRECO) underline “the excellent working conditions of judges and prosecutors in Monaco” and the “development of judicial infrastructures for a country of this size”. However, it made recommendations on the transparency of recruitments which need to be based on objective criteria.

In February 2020, GRECO published its compliance report stating that this recommendation (viii) has been partly followed.

== Composition ==
The Supreme Court is composed of five full members and two substitute members. They are appointed by the Prince for a period of eight years on the proposal of various Monegasque bodies: the National Council, the Council of State, the Crown Council, the Court of Appeal and the Court of First Instance, each proposing a member, the National Council and the Council of State each proposing in addition an alternate member. Article 89 of the Constitution gives the Prince the possibility of not accepting these candidatures and of requesting new ones.

The President and the Vice-President of the Supreme Court are appointed by the Prince. The vice-president is responsible for replacing the President in the event of his absence or incapacity.

The members of the Supreme Court must be at least 40 years old and chosen from among "particularly competent lawyers". In practice, these are French lawyers, who are, for example, professors of public law, members of the Council of State or of the Court of Cassation.

=== Current members ===
- Didier Linotte, president; associate professor in public law, lawyer at the Grasse and Paris bars
- Didier Ribes, vice-president; associate in public law, master of requests to the Council of State of France
- Philippe Blachèr, full member; associate in public law, Professor at the University of Lyon III (Jean Moulin)
- Stéphane Braconnier, full member; associate in public law, Professor at the University of Paris II - Panthéon-Assas
- Pierre de Montalivet, full member; associate in public law, Professor at the University of Paris-Est (Paris XII-Créteil)
- Magali Ingall-Montagnier, substitute member; referendum adviser at the Court of Auditors, substitute member of the French Conflict Tribunal, adviser to the Cabinet of the President of the Senate
- Guillaume Drago, substitute member; associate professor in public law at the Panthéon Assas University (Paris II), son of Roland Drago

=== Presidents ===
- André Auzouy (1924–1932)
- André Lacroix (1932–1946)
- Amédée Roussellier (1946–1960)
- Jean Brouchot (1960-?)
- 1960-1998:?
- Roland Drago (1998–2007)
- Hubert Charles (2007–2012)
- Didier Linotte (since 2012)

== Jurisdiction ==
=== Control acts ===
The jurisdiction of the Supreme Court is both administrative and constitutional. It is set by article 90 of the Constitution.

In constitutional matters, the Supreme Court rules sovereignly on appeals for annulment, assessment of validity and compensation having as their object an infringement of the freedoms and rights enshrined in Title III of the 1962 Constitution.

In administrative matters, the Supreme Court also rules sovereignly on the appeals for annulment for excess of power brought against the decisions of the various administrative authorities and the sovereign ordinances taken for the execution of the laws, as well as on the granting of the resulting compensation. The General Court also has jurisdiction over appeals in cassation brought against decisions of lower administrative courts and over appeals for interpretation and assessment of the validity of decisions of administrative authorities.

The Rules of Procedure of the National Council and their possible modifications are systematically checked by the Supreme Court before their entry into force.

=== Other remedies ===
Other remedies are defined by article 90-A-2 of the Constitution:

- The action to intervene by a person interested in an ongoing dispute is open, either voluntarily on his or her initiative, or by decision of the President, or at the request of one of the parties to the main dispute.
- The appeal for assessment of validity is governed by article 16 of the amended ordinance of April 16, 1963 on the organization and functioning of the Tribunal. This is an appeal on referral from the judicial authority which must be filed within two months "from the date on which the decision of the judicial court becomes final.
- The claim for compensation aims to repair damage resulting from a law or an administrative act declared non-compliant by the Court.
- Section 3 of the Sovereign Order n o 2.984 of April 16, 1963 amended organizes, in Articles 39 et seq., emergency procedures, in particular stay of execution and summary proceedings, which may accompany applications on the merits.

== Process ==
=== Initiation of proceedings ===
The Tribunal may be referred to any person, natural or legal, having an interest in acting, both in administrative and constitutional matters.

The time limit for litigation (in administrative or constitutional matters) is two months from either the completion of the regular publicity formalities (notification, service, or publication of the act or the contested decision), or from the date where the fact on which the action is based was known to the person concerned.

Appeals for assessment of validity and appeals for interpretation on referral must also be lodged within two months “of the date on which the decision of the court becomes final”.

The appeal before the Supreme Court must be lodged by a request containing, in addition to the contested decision, the statement of facts, the means and the conclusions; and must be signed by a lawyer registered with the bar of the Principality. It can however be drawn up by a foreign lawyer, assisted by a colleague from Monaco as regards the procedural formalities. The foreign lawyer who wishes to plead must first be authorized by the President. The request is filed with the General Registry against receipt.

=== Course of the proceedings ===
The Chief Registrar (who received the request against receipt) immediately sends a copy of the request to the defendant, the President and the Attorney General.

The administration has two months to present a counter-request signed by a lawyer-defender and filed with the General Registry against receipt. The Registrar sends a copy of this counter-request to the applicant, the President and the Attorney General.

The applicant, the President and the Attorney General then have one month to file a reply and a rejoinder which they must file with the General Registry against receipt.

The President of the Tribunal appoints a rapporteur for each complaint.

During the course of the proceedings, the President may order the investigative measures he deems useful for the manifestation of the truth.

At the end of the exchange of written submissions, the Chief Registrar closes the proceedings and the President sets the date for the hearing.

=== Audience ===
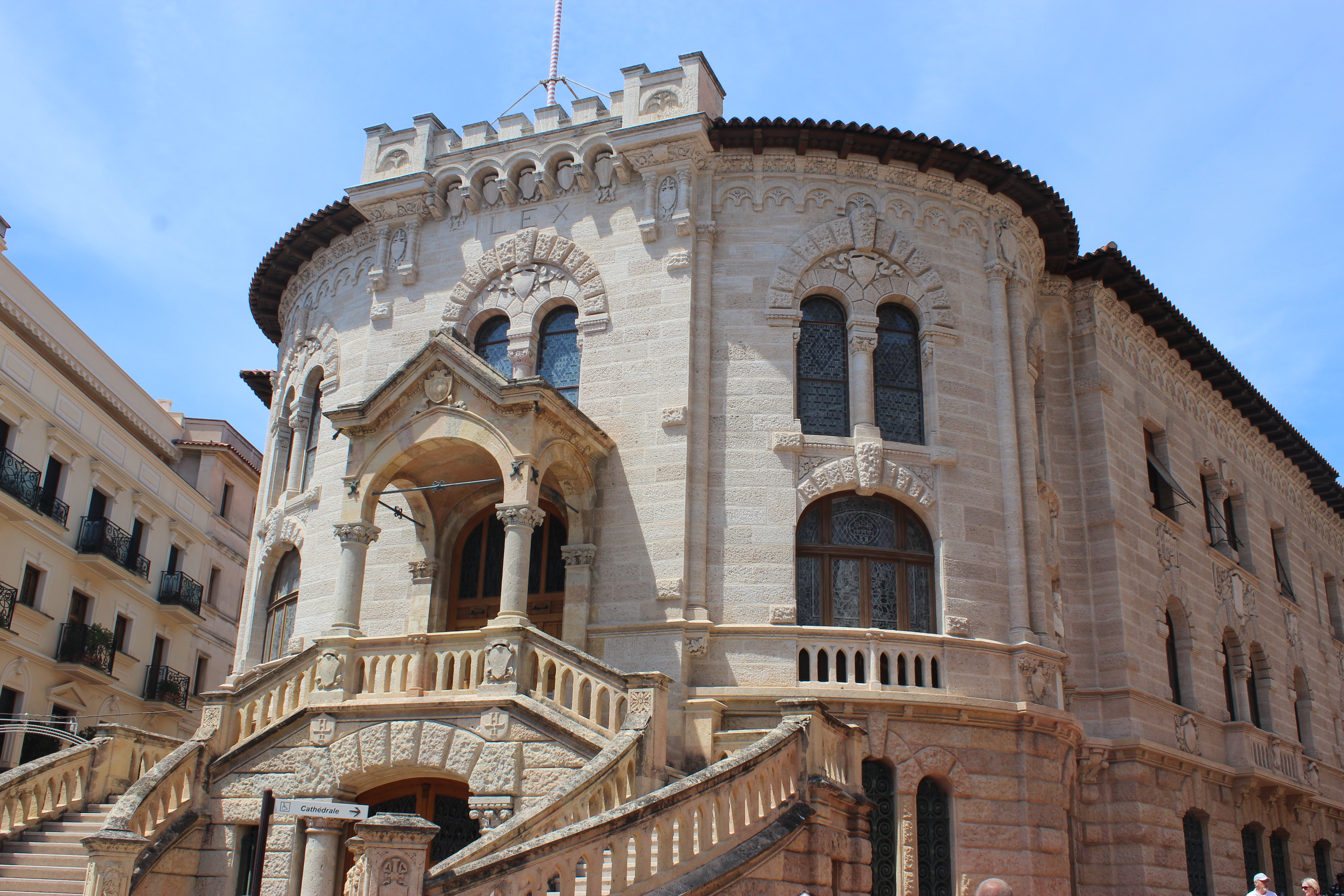
Palace of Justice of Monaco

The Supreme Court of Monaco sits at the Palace of Justice of Monaco.

While the hearings of the Tribunal are in principle public, in the event of a risk of disturbing public order, it can order, either ex officio or at the request of the public prosecutor, that they take place behind closed doors.

The police of the hearings belongs to the President who has all the powers to ensure the serenity of the debates including that of requesting the public force.

The Supreme Court hearings service is provided by one of the Principality's judicial officers, the registry is provided by the chief clerk.

After the parties have been called by the bailiff, the President gives the floor to the rapporteur who sums up the facts, the means and the conclusions without opening an opinion. The parties' lawyers are then invited to plead (by brief observations since the procedure is written). The Attorney General then concludes on behalf of the law. The parties' lawyers can then make final oral observations. At the end of the debates, the members of the tribunal retire to deliberate in chambers. While the State of Monaco has regularly pleaded by the same French lawyer for over 20 years, the court arrogated to itself the right to choose from among the applicants' lawyers the one authorized to plead when they are not registered with the bar of Monaco or when their number is considered too large.

=== Decision ===
The Tribunal's decision is read in open court, after deliberation in the Council Chamber, no later than the fortnight following the proceedings. The reading may be made by one of the members of the Tribunal who sat and deliberated in the case.

The Court can also, by decision before saying right, order all useful investigative measures.

The decisions of the Supreme Court are published in the Journal de Monaco and online on Legimonaco. Notification of the decision is made by the Chief Registrar to the parties, a copy of the decision is delivered to the Attorney General.
