= Sophie Thévenoux =

Monegasque politician and diplomat

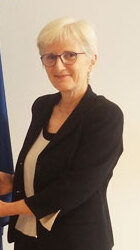

Counsellor of Finance and Economy
- In office 2009–2011
- Monarch: Albert II
- Preceded by: Gilles Tonelli
- Succeeded by: Marco Piccinini

Personal details
- Born: 19 May 1957 (age 69)

Sophie Thévenoux (née Solamito) (born 19 May 1957) is a Monegasque politician and diplomat.

== Early life and education ==
Sophie Thévenoux was born as Sophie Solamito on 19 May 1957.

== Career ==
Thevenoux was named to the Council of Government in 2009, taking up her position as Counsellor of Finance and Economy on March 26 of that year; she became the first woman to be named to a ministerial post in the government of Monaco. She presided over the ministry during a difficult period, during which revenue declined a considerable amount due to a variety of factors. She had previously served as director general of the Department of Finance and Economy, to which position she had been named in 2005. Thevenoux remained in charge of the ministry until 2011, when she was replaced by Marco Piccinini; Marie-Pierre Gramaglia entered the cabinet at the same time, becoming the second woman in Monaco's history to be appointed to such a position.

In 2015 she was named Head of the Principality of Monaco's Mission to the European Union and the European Atomic Energy Community, presenting her credentials to Donald Tusk on May 7; at the same time she became Monaco's ambassador to Belgium, Luxembourg and the Netherlands, as well as Permanent Representative to the Organisation for the Prohibition of Chemical Weapons.

She has attended the World Policy Conference.

She previously served as Monaco's ambassador to France.

== Personal life ==
As of 2016 she is married.

== Honours ==
In 2016 she was named a Grand Officier of the Ordre National du Mérite in a ceremony in Brussels.
