= Noi donne =

Italian feminist magazine

- Former editors: Fidia Gambetti; Maria Antonietta Macciocchi
- Categories: Feminist magazine
- Frequency: Monthly
- Founder: Valentina Palumbo
- Founded: 1944
- First issue: July 1944
- Country: Italy
- Based in: Rome
- Language: Italian
- Website: Noi donne
- ISSN: 0029-0920
- OCLC: 29807409

Noi donne (Italian: We Women) is a monthly feminist magazine published in Rome, Italy. It is one of the most significant feminist publications in the country.

== History and profile ==
Noi donne was illegally published between 1937 and 1939 in Paris by the Italian women exiled there before its official start in 1944. Its publication was possible only after the liberation of Rome and the first issue appeared in Naples in July 1944. The founders led by Valentina Palumbo and Adele Cambria were communist women. In the period between 1952 and 1953 the number of the pages was 48.

The headquarters of the magazine was moved from Naples to Rome. From 1945 to the 1990s it was the official magazine of the Unione Donne in Italia (UDI, Union of Women in Italy; then named Unione Donne Italiane, Union of Italian Women). The Union was closely connected to and financed by the Italian Communist Party (PCI).

Noi donne is circulated monthly, and its website was launched in 2004. It was previously published on a weekly basis. The magazine was funded by government funding which temporarily ended in the late 1993.

The magazine sold nearly 300,000 copies in 1952. In the 1970s Noi donne enjoyed higher levels of circulation.

== Content and political stance ==
Noi donne was not established as a magazine targeting bourgeois Italian women. Instead, its target audience is women on the left. Maria Casalini claimed that the magazine was instrumental in introducing Italian women to the political arena of democratic Italy. However, at the beginning of the 1950s its focus was on entertainment, daily life and culture. Later, the magazine again began to cover articles on politics, social change, culture, women's equality, violence against women and health. Noi donne also features articles on cinema. In addition, it frequently attacked mainstream women's magazines in Italy.

In 2001 Newsweek described Noi donne as a popular semifeminist magazine. In addition, it was less feminist than other magazines such as Effe and Differenze.

== Editors and contributors ==
The editors of Noi donne have been women. Maria Antonietta Macciocchi, an Italian politician and writer, served as the editor of the magazine from 1950 to 1956. She replaced Fidia Gambetti in the post. Bia Sarasini was the cultural editor during the 1990s.

Among its collaborators have been Lea Melandri, Ada Gobetti, Camilla Ravera, Nadia Gallico Spano, Anna Maria Ortese, Marguerite Duras, Giovanna Pajetta, Umberto Eco, Gianni Rodari, Ellekappa, Franca Fossati, Pat Carra, Roberta Tatafiore, Cristina Gentile, Ida Magli, Mariella Gramaglia, Bia Sarasini, Silvia Neonato, Anna Maria Crispino, Nadia Tarantini, Patrizia Carrano, Maria Rosa Cutrufelli, Valentina Savioli, Adriano Sofri, and Rosi Braidotti.
