= Commemorative coins of Monaco =

The commemorative coins of Monaco are minted by the Monagasque Treasury since the re-valuation of the French franc in 1960 and before the introduction of the euro in 2002.

== Silver issues ==
=== 10 Francs ===
.900 silver / 25 grams / 38 mm.

- 1966 – 100th anniversary of accession, Charles III, Prince of Monaco
- 1966 – 10th anniversary of marriage, Rainier III, Prince of Monaco and Grace Kelly

Note: the above coins were also issued in .900 fine gold with the same denomination.

=== 50 Francs ===
- 1974 – 25th anniversary of accession, Rainier III, 1949–1974, profile in military uniform
- 1974 – 24th anniversary of reign, Rainier III, profile facing right (unofficial issue)

Note: the above coins were also issued in .900 fine gold with the same denomination.

=== 100 Francs ===
- 1982 – Heir apparent Albert II, Prince of Monaco
- 1989 – 40th anniversary of accession, Rainier III
- 1997 – 700th anniversary of Grimaldi dynasty, 1297–1997
- 1999 – 50th anniversary of accession, Rainier III
