= Economy of Monaco =

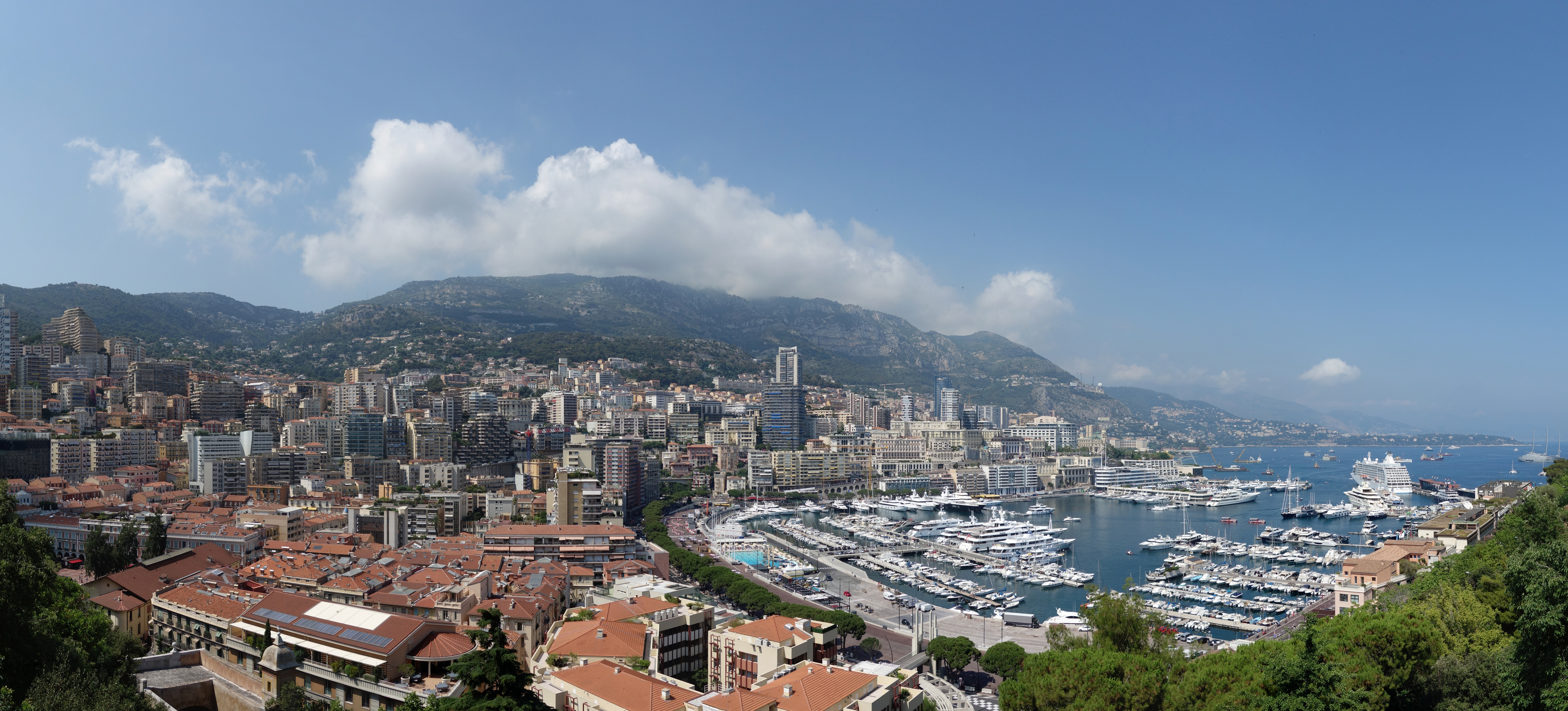
- Monaco as seen from the Place du Palais in Monaco-Ville
- Currency: Euro (EUR, €)
- Fiscal year: calendar year
- Trade organisations: EUCU
- Country group: Developed/Advanced High-income economy

Statistics
- Population: ▼38,367 (31 December 2023)
- GDP: ▲$10.00 billion (nominal, 2023); $7.672 billion (PPP, 2015 est.)
- GDP growth: ▼ -13.01% (2020 est.); ▲21.87% (2021 est.); ▲11.1% (2022 est.)
- GDP per capita: ▲$288,002 (nominal, 2024); ▲$115,700 (PPP, 2015 est.)
- GDP by sector: Agriculture: 0%; Industry: 12.3%; Services: 87.7%; (2022 est.)
- Labour force: ▲63,479 (2023); 47.9% employment rate (2016)
- Unemployment: 26.6% youth unemployment (2016 est.)
- All values, unless otherwise stated, are in US dollars.

The economy of Monaco is reliant on tourism and banking. Monaco, situated on the French coast of the Mediterranean Sea, is a popular resort, attracting tourists to its casino and pleasant climate.

The Principality has successfully sought to diversify into services and small, high-value-added, nonpolluting industries. The state has no income tax and low business taxes and thrives as a tax haven both for individuals who have established residence and for foreign companies that have set up businesses and offices. The state retains monopolies in a number of sectors, including gambling, tobacco, the telephone network, and the postal service.

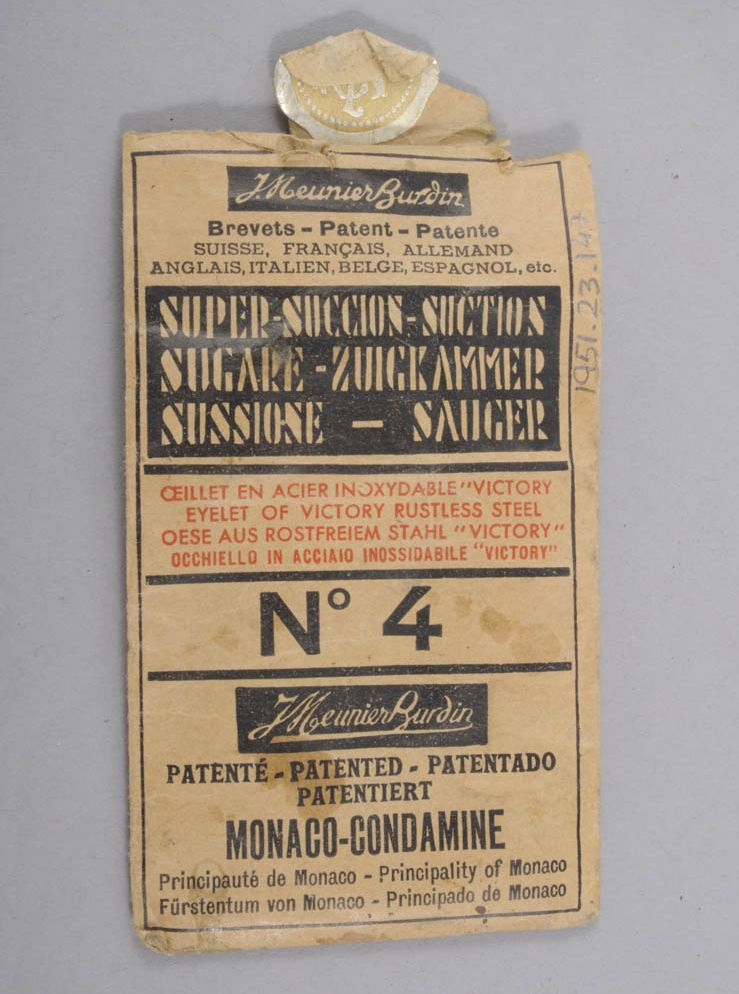
Denture adhesion rings made in Monaco, early to mid 20th century

== Background ==
Economic development was spurred in the late 19th century with the opening of the rail link to France and the Monte Carlo Casino. Monaco's economy is now primarily geared toward finance, services, and real estate.

== Modern times ==
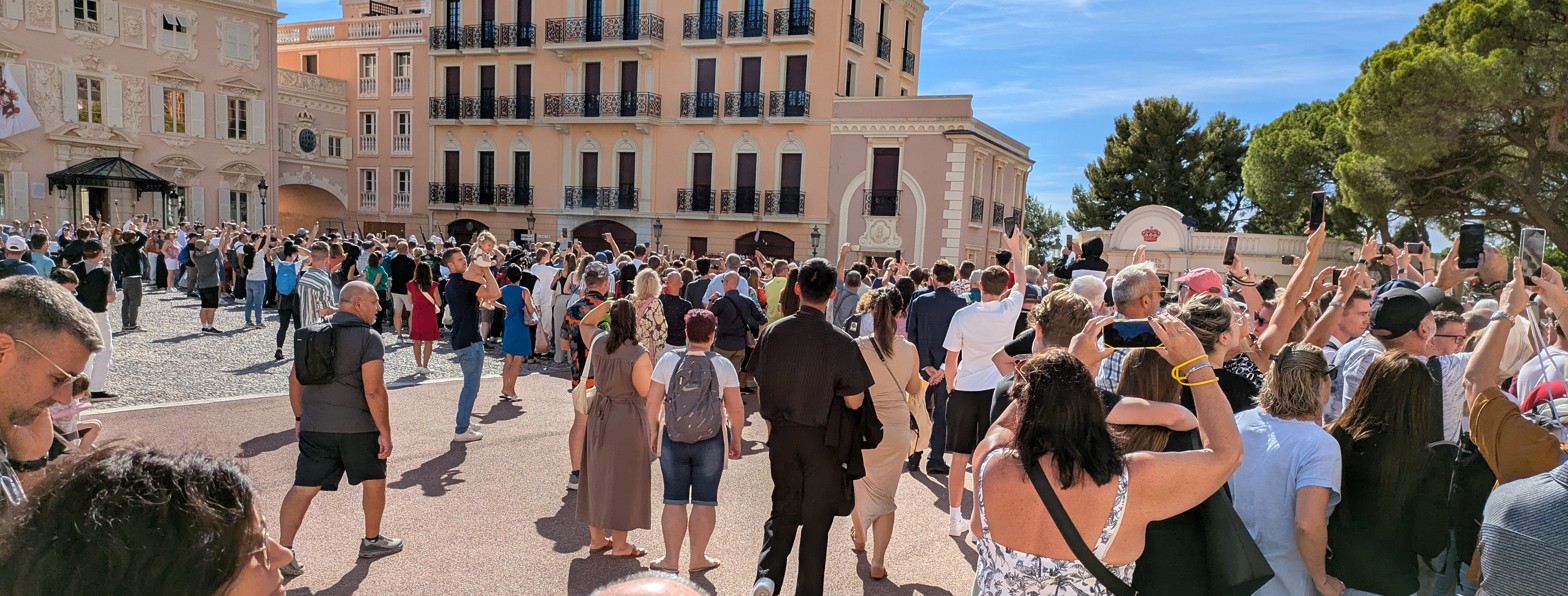
Tourists in Monaco

Low taxes have drawn many foreign individuals to Monaco and account for around 75% of the $7.78 billion annual GDP income in (2021). Similarly, tourism accounts for close to 15% of the annual revenue, as the Principality of Monaco also has been a major center for tourism ever since the famed Monte Carlo Casino was established in 1856.

Financial and insurance activities, along with scientific, support-administrative, activities are the main contributors to the GDP of Monaco. Wholesale trades (10%), construction (9.1%) and real estate activities (7.8%) also contribute highly to the country's GDP. Monaco real estate is known to be one of the most expensive in the world. Banking sector of Monaco is rather large: in 2015 consolidated banking assets 8.42 times exceeded the country's GDP. Banks operating in Monaco traditionally specialize in private banking, asset and wealth management services. Wholesale trade, construction and real estate sectors come afterward in the ranking.

An economic and customs union with France governs customs, postal services, telecommunications, and banking in Monaco. Before the euro, Monaco used the Monegasque franc, which itself was pegged to the French franc. Now part of the Eurozone, but not the EU, Monaco mints its own euro coins.

Monaco is noted for its activity in the field of marine sciences. Its Oceanographic Museum, formerly directed by Jacques-Yves Cousteau, is one of the most renowned institutions of its kind in the world. Monaco import and exports products and services from all over the world. There is no commercial agriculture in Monaco; it is 100% urban.

== Tax haven ==
Monaco levies no annual income tax on individuals and sole traders. This has attracted a considerable number of wealthy tax refugees residents from European countries who derive the majority of their income from activity outside Monaco. Celebrities such as Formula One drivers attract most of the attention, but the vast majority of them are less well-known business people.

The corporate tax rate is 25% annually, but companies are exempted if at least 75% of their revenue is generated locally. Most goods and services have a 20% value-added tax, with reduced rates for select basic products. Other taxes include transfer duties on old real estate (4.75-10%) and leasehold duties (1% annually).

In 2000, a report by the French parliamentarians, Arnaud Montebourg and Vincent Peillon, alleged that Monaco had lax policies with respect to money laundering, including within its famed casino, and that the government of Monaco had been placing political pressure on the judiciary so that alleged crimes were not properly investigated.

In 1998, the Organisation for Economic Co-operation and Development (OECD) issued a first report on the consequences of the tax havens' financial systems. Monaco did not appear in the list of these territories until 2004, when OECD became indignant regarding the Monegasque situation and denounced it in its last report, as well as Andorra, Liechtenstein, Liberia and the Marshall Islands, underlining its lack of co-operation as regards financial information disclosure and availability.

In 2000, the Financial Action Task Force on Money Laundering (FATF) stated: "The anti-money laundering system in Monaco is comprehensive. However, difficulties have been encountered with Monaco by countries in international investigations on serious crimes that appear to be linked also with tax matters. In addition, the FIU of Monaco (SICCFIN) suffers a great lack of adequate resources. The authorities of Monaco have stated that they will provide additional resources to SICCFIN." The Principality is no longer blamed in the 2005 FATF report, as well as all other territories. In 2003, the International Monetary Fund (IMF) has identified Monaco, along with 36 other territories, as a tax haven but Monaco came out of that list in 2009.

In June 2024, due to concerns about money laundering and terror financing, the FATF added Monaco to a list of countries "under increased monitoring." In a statement, the FATF said that the country needed to "address strategic deficiencies."

== National enterprises ==
Monaco's economy is also based on national companies, which combined produce over a billion in profit every year. Among the most profitable and well-known companies outside Monaco are the Société des bains de mer, the bank UBS Monaco, the auction house Monaco Legend Group and the media conglomerate Lagardère News.

== Companies ==
In 2026, the sector with the highest number of companies registered in Monaco was Finance, Insurance, and Real Estate with 5,003 companies followed by Services with 2,330 companies and Wholesale Trade with 793 companies.

== Public finances ==
In 2023 Monaco recorded government revenues of 2.19 billion EUR and expenses of 2.07 billion EUR, for a 126 million EUR budget surplus.

The state's fiscal reserves, the Constitutional Reserve Fund (CRF), reached a balance of 7 billion EUR in 2023, up from 5.7 billion EUR in 2019.

== See also ==
- Department of Finance and Economy (Monaco)
- Economy of Europe
