= Gilles Tonelli =

Monegasque engineer, diplomat and politician

Acting Minister of State of Monaco
- In office 16 December 2015 – 1 February 2016
- Monarch: Albert II
- Preceded by: Michel Roger
- Succeeded by: Serge Telle

Counsellor of Finance and Economy
- In office 2006–2009
- Monarch: Albert II
- Preceded by: Franck Biancheri
- Succeeded by: Sophie Thévenoux

Personal details
- Born: 27 November 1957 (age 68)
- Party: Independent
- Children: 3
- Education: Special School of Public Works; University of Nice Sophia Antipolis

Gilles Tonelli (born 27 November 1957) is a Monegasque engineer, diplomat and politician.

Tonelli served as the Minister of Public Works, the Environment and Urban Development from 2005 to 2006, the Minister of Finance and Economy from 2006 to 2009, and the Minister of Public Works, the Environment and Urban Development from 2009 to 2011. He was the Monegasque Ambassador to Belgium, the Netherlands, Luxembourg, and the European Union between 2011 and 2015.

Tonelli served as the Monegasque Minister of Foreign Affairs and Cooperation from 2016 to 2019. He has overseen negotiations for more bilateral exchanges between Monaco and the European Union.

== Early life ==
Gilles Tonelli was born on 27 November 1957. He graduated from the École Spéciale des Travaux Publics, and he earned a master of advanced studies degree in mathematics from the University of Nice Sophia Antipolis.

== Career ==
Tonelli began his career as an engineer for SOFRESID (now a subsidiary of Saipem) in Paris in 1983–1984.

Tonelli worked for the Monegasque Ministry of Public Works and Social Affairs from 1984 to 1993, and he served as its Director-General from 1993 to 1999. He was the Minister of Public Works, the Environment and Urban Development from 2005 to 2006, the Minister of Finance and Economy from 2006 to 2009, and the Minister of Public Works, the Environment and Urban Development from 2009 to 2011. From 2011 to 2015, he was the Monegasque Ambassador to Belgium, the Netherlands, Luxembourg, and the European Union. Tonelli served as the interim Minister of State after Michel Roger fell ill in December 2015, up until Serge Telle was appointed as his successor in February 2016.

Tonelli succeeded José Badia as the Monegasque Minister of Foreign Affairs and Cooperation in February 2015. In a speech at the Headquarters of the United Nations in October 2015, he reiterated Monaco's fight against extremist violence and money laundering as well as ethnic cleansing and genocide. Since November 2016, he has also begun negotiations for an agreement between Monaco and the European Union to enable Monegasque subjects to work and study in E.U. countries, not just France. However, he has stated that Monaco will not join the European Economic Area or the European Union.

Tonelli is the former president of the Monaco Nautical Society and the Monegasque Rowing Federation.

== Honours ==
=== National honours ===
- France:
  - Officer of the National Order of Legion of Honour
  - Officer of the National Order of Merit
- Monaco:
  - Officer of the Order of Saint-Charles

== Personal life ==
Tonelli is married, and he has three children.

Political offices
Preceded by Michel Roger	Minister of State of Monaco; Acting; 2015–2016	Succeeded by Serge Telle
