= Marco Piccinini =

Monegasque politician

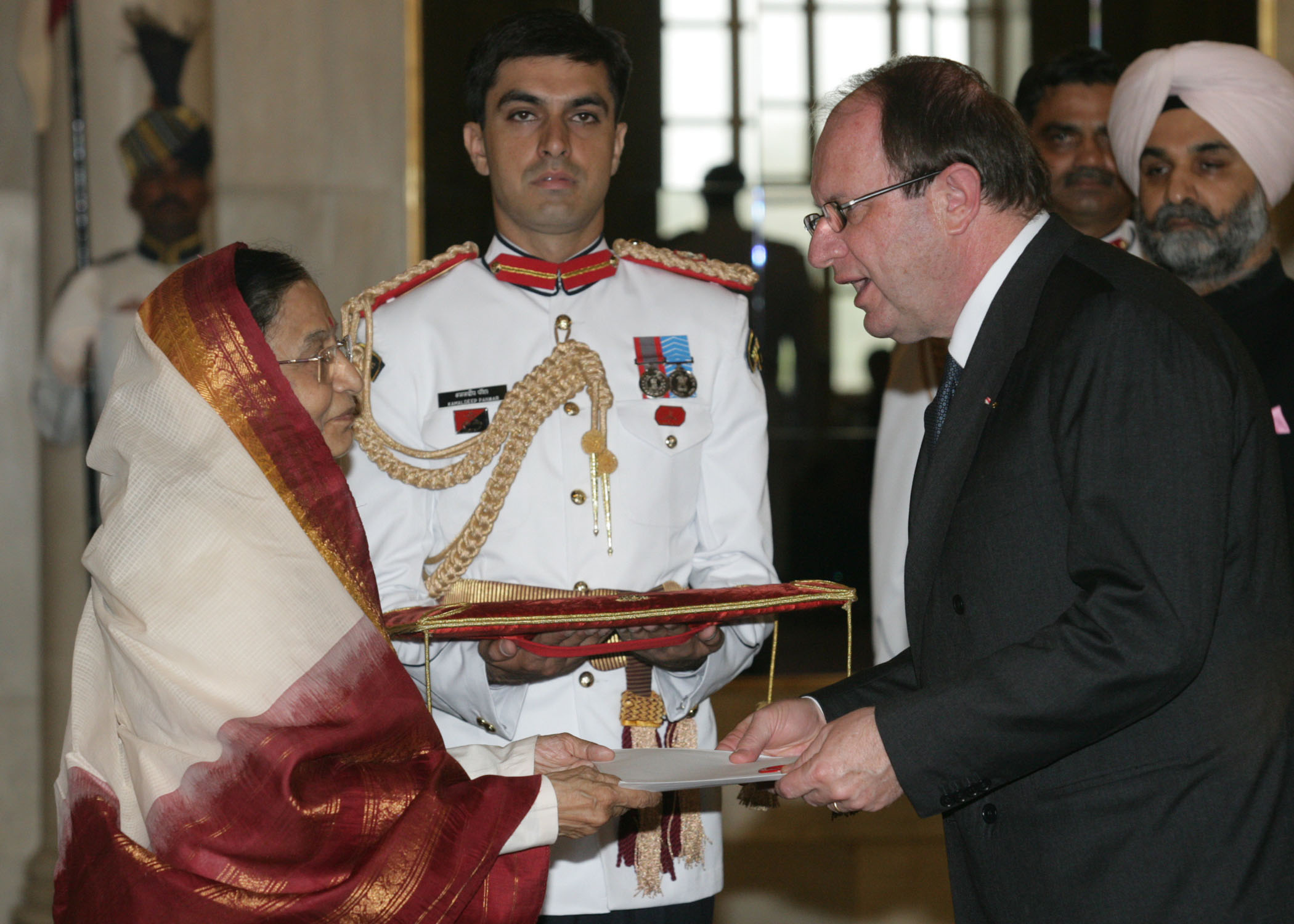

Counsellor of Finance and Economy
- In office September 2023 – 18 March 2024
- Monarch: Albert II
- Preceded by: Jean Castellini
- Succeeded by: Pierre-André Chiappori
- In office 2011–2012
- Monarch: Albert II
- Preceded by: Sophie Thévenoux
- Succeeded by: Jean Castellini

Personal details
- Born: 2 July 1952 (age 72)

Marco Piccinini (born 2 July 1952 in Rome) is a Monegasque sport personality, businessman, and politician.

== Personal ==
Piccinini's father Arnaldo was a pioneer in the Italian electronic industry. In the 1950s he founded an industrial group which included innovative brands such as VOXSON (TV, car radios, hi-fi etc.) and VIDEOCOLOR (color TV picture tubes and other hi-tech electronic components). At the end of the 1960s, due to Arnaldo's declining health, the family disposed of their interests in the various industrial activities and decided to move to Monaco where, after his father's death, Marco focused on his two main interests – finance and motor racing.

Marco studied architecture in Rome, where he also began his involvement in motor racing by cooperating with a Formula 3 constructor and racing team ‘‘De Sanctis’’. He also received training in the Techniques of International Negotiations at the Graduate Institute of International Studies in Geneva.

In 1997 married Marie-Ahlem and they have a daughter.

== Institutional ==
- March 2024 – current, Ambassador of Monaco for International Financial Negotiations.
- September 2023 - March 2024, Counsellor of Government, Minister of Finance and Economy of Monaco.
- 2017, September 2023 Senior Advisor to the Minister of State of Monaco.
- 2011-2012, Counsellor of Government, Minister of Finance and Economy of Monaco.

In this capacity he focused particularly on:

- restoring a balanced budget, generating a cash surplus in 2012;
- Introducing new legislations and process to ensure compliance of Monaco with modern standards in the field of international tax cooperation (OCED - Global Tax Forum) and anti-money laundering (Moneyval);
- reducing the risk profile of the Monaco National Reserve Fund while preserving its profitability.

- 2010, he served as Ambassador of Monaco to China and India

== Sport ==
Société Monégasque de Constructions Automobiles MP

- 1974 - co-founded the first Monegasque racing car manufacturer - Société Monégasque de Constructions Automobiles MP - which produced a few Formula 3 single seaters.

Ferrari

- 1977 - appointed by Enzo Ferrari as his representative for Formula 1 matters and shortly afterward appointed as the ‘‘Direttore Sportivo’’ of the Ferrari Team.[3]
- 1978-1988, Motor Sport Director of Ferrari and Team Principal of the Formula 1 Team. In this capacity he was one of the architects of the ‘‘Concorde Agreement’’, the charter governing regulatory as well as financial aspects of the Formula 1 World Championship.
- From 1983 until 2016, Member of the Board of Directors of Ferrari SpA.

CSAI - Commissione Sportiva Automobilistica Italiana

- 1993-1994, President of CSAI, the Italian Motor Sport commission, and elected in 1994 as a Vice President of FIA, the international Motor Sport Governing Body.

Prada Challenge for America’s Cup

- 1997-2000, Executive Deputy Chairman and Challenge Representative of the PRADA Team during the America’s Cup XXX (Auckland 2000). Luna Rossa won the Louis Vuitton Cup and became the finalist against Team New Zealand.
- Member of the Board of ACCA (America’s Cup Challengers Association);
- Chairman of the marketing Committee of ACCA;
- Executive Chairman of the Challenger of Record Management for America’s Cup XXXI (i.e. the challengers association), the organiser of the Challenger Selection Series.

FOA – Formula One Administration

- 1998-99, Deputy CEO of FOA and FOM - Formula One Management (commercial rights holders for the Formula 1 World Championship).

FIA – Fédération Internationale de l’Automobile

- 1998-2008 Deputy President of FIA, chaired the World Motor Sport Council, the executive body which regulates all motor sport disciplines worldwide. Piccinini was serving out his third term as Deputy President but left his post a year early to focus on other professional commitments.[4]

== Monaco Sporting Associations ==
- 1981-2010 member of the Board of Directors of Automobile Club de Monaco), the organiser of the Monaco Grand Prix and Monte-Carlo Rally.
- 1999-2010, member of the Executive Committee of the Yacht Club de Monaco' Also a member of the Constitution Committee of ISAF - International Sailing Federation.
- 1999-2010, member of the Committee of MCCC – Monte-Carlo Country Club - the organiser of the Tennis Masters Series Monte Carlo ATP 1000.
- 2003-2009, member of the Board of Directors of AS Monaco Football Club, several times winner of the French Premier League and finalist of the 2004 UEFA Champion’s League.

== Finance ==
Société de Crédit et de Banque de Monaco (Socrédit)

- 1975–1989, member of the Board of Directors of Société de Crédit et de Banque de Monaco (Socrédit).

Société d'Etudes de Participations et de Courtages (SEPAC)

- 1978-2010, member of the Board of Directors of SEPAC, a property and real estate management company.

Crédit Mobilier de Monaco (CMM)

- 1981-2010, member of the Board of Directors of Crédit Mobilier de Monaco.

Compagnie Monégasque de Banque (Monaco)

- 2006-2010, member of the Board of Directors of Compagnie Monégasque de Banque: the international private banking subsidiary of Mediobanca.

Finter Bank Zurich

- From 1989 until 2015, member of the Board of Directors of this medium size Swiss banking group, specialized in private banking and asset/funds management.

SBM - Société des Bains de Mer à Monaco

- From 1998 until 2009, member of the Board of Directors of SBM, the largest Monegasque company, listed on the Paris stock exchange. SBM is the main resort and luxury hotel operator of the Principality of Monaco, including the Hotel de Paris, Hotel Hermitage, Les Casinos de Monte-Carlo, the Monte-Carlo Sporting Club etc. Also served as chairman of the Human Resources Committee of the Board.

Poltrona Frau SpA

- From 2006 until 2010, a member of the Board of Directors of the Group, one of the world’s leading producers of luxury furnishing under three principal brands, Poltrona Frau, Cassina, Cappellini.

Charme Capital Partners SGR

- From 2007 until 2016, independent Director of Charme Partners SGR, an international Private Equity management company.

Italcementi SpA

- From 1992 until 2013, a member of the Board of Directors of this group, one of the leading worldwide construction materials producer.

Church’s Shoes Ltd

- From 2006 until 2014, a member of the Board of Directors of Church’s Shoes Ltd., the English luxury shoes maker, member of the PRADA Group.

== Other positions ==
Piccinini currently serves also as a member of :

- the Board of Trustees of the International Theological Institute, Trumau, Austria: a Catholic theological faculty with degrees granted by the Holy See.
- the Board of Directors of FSCIRE - Fondazione per le Scienze Religiose Giovanni XXIII
- the Board of Trustees of Villa Nazareth Foundation (https://villanazareth.org/ ) (Vatican City): an educational institution active since 1946.

== Previous positions ==
Piccinini also served in the past as a member of :

- the Supervisory Board of Nice Aéroports de la Côte d’Azur (https://www.nice.aeroport.fr/)
- the Board of Directors of Azzurra Aeroporti S.p.A.(https://www.azzurra-aeroporti.com/)
