= List of ambassadors of Monaco to China =

Coordinates: 39.913816°N 116.447686°E

Ambassador of Monaco to the People's Republic of China
- Incumbent; Catherine Fautrier since January 16, 2012
- Inaugural holder: Rainier Imperti
- Formation: March 21, 2007

The Monégasque ambassador in Beijing is the official representative of the Government in Monaco City to the Government of the People's Republic of China.

== List of representatives ==
Diplomatic agrément/Diplomatic accreditation	ambassador	Observations	Minister of State (Monaco)	Premier of the People's Republic of China	Term end
January 16, 1995		Establishment of diplomatic relations	Paul Dijoud	Li Peng	
March 21, 2007	Rainier Imperti		Jean-Paul Proust	Wen Jiabao	
March 19, 2010	Marco Piccinini	ambassador to India and China	Jean-Paul Proust	Wen Jiabao	
January 16, 2012	Catherine Fautrier		Michel Roger	Wen Jiabao	
