= Hubert Charles (lawyer) =

French-Monegasque judge and lawyer

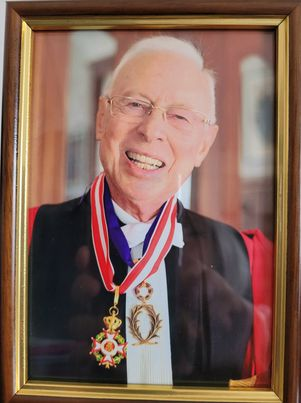

President of the Supreme Court of Monaco
- In office 2007–2012

Hubert Charles (1925–2017) was a French-Monegasque judge and lawyer, Honorary Professor of Law at the University of Nice Sophia-Antipolis, President of Supreme Court of Monaco from 2007 to 2012, Honorary President of the Supreme Court of Monaco. Charles was particularly known for his work in administrative law and town planning law.

== Early life and education ==
Hubert Charles was born in 1925. His father Jean Charles was a Batonnier of the Order of Lawyers of Nice. Charles completed his higher legal education at the Institute of Legal Studies in Nice and at the Faculty of Law in Aix-en-Provence.

== Career ==
In 1961–1962, he worked as an assistant at the University of Aix-en-Provence, and in 1963-1965 as an assistant at the University of Nice-Sophia-Antipolis. Charles was an Honorary Professor of Law at the University of Nice Sophia-Antipolis.

On 24 July 2007, Charles was appointed a President of the Supreme Court of Monaco and was reappointed to this post on 5 August 2011. He held this position until July 2012 when he resigned. Didier Linotte became his successor. The honorary position of President of the Supreme Court of Monaco was conferred on Charles.

On 17 November 2009, Charles was awarded the Order of Saint Charles in the rank of Commander. On 23 November 2012, Charles was awarded the second Order of Saint Charles in the rank of Grand Officer.

Hubert Charles died in 2017.

== Awards and orders ==
- Order of Saint Charles (rank of Commander, 2009)
- Order of Saint Charles (rank of Grand Officer, 2012)
- Order of Academic Palms
