= Catherine Fautrier =

Monegasque diplomat and politician

Catherine Fautrier-Rousseau is a Monegasque diplomat and politician who has served as an Ambassador of Monaco to Spain since 2020. Fautrier previously served as Ambassador to China and Australia.

== Education ==
- 1992, University Master Degree in International Affairs – ESC Clermont-Ferrand.
- 1991, Bachelor and Degree in International Affairs – ESCE Paris.
- 1988, Baccalaureat in economy, Lycée Albert 1er Monaco.
