= Velio Spano =

Italian politician and anti-fascist partisan (1905–1964)

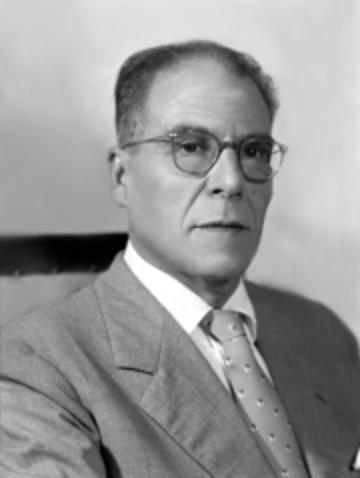
- Spano in 1963
- Born: 15 January 1905; Teulada, Sardinia, Kingdom of Italy
- Died: 7 October 1964 (aged 59); Rome, Lazio, Italy
- Education: Sapienza University of Rome; University of Turin
- Occupations: Anti-fascist activist; journalist; politician
- Political party: PCI
- Spouse: Nadia Gallico (m. 1940)
- Children: 3

Velio Spano (15 January 1905 – 7 October 1964) was a Sardinian-born antifascist activist and, at times, fighter through the Mussolini years. He is also remembered for his (mainly political) writings: he later came to be identified, increasingly, as a journalist. After the leader fell from power in 1943 and Italy was liberated in 1945, he became an increasingly mainstream politician, serving as a member of the senate between 1948 and 1963, and playing an increasingly prominent leadership role in the Communist Party.

== Life ==
=== Provenance and early years ===
Velio Spano was born at Teulada, a little town close to the southern tip of Sardinia, which had been part of Italy since unification. Attilio Spano, his father, worked for the government. Antonietta Contini, his mother, was a school teacher. When Velio was just 5 the family relocated some fifty kilometers to the north, to Guspini, a slightly larger and more dynamic small town in which the local economy was, at that time, dominated by lead and zinc mining. Over the next 13 years he grew up among the mining community in Guspini, which was widely regarded as a hotbed of socialism. He was exposed to the prevailing left-wing ideas of the time, and to the potential power of effective political organisation. After he passed his eleventh birthday he became based, for most of the year, in Cagliari where he attended the Giovanni Siotto Pintor Middle School for two years. He then transferred to the Giovanni Maria Dettori High School, where he successfully completed the “classical” curriculum in 1922 which opened the way to a university-level education. It was also In October 1922 that Mussolini took power across the water in Rome, although it would be some years before the full implications of this development became widely apparent. For a teenager with Spano's political background and instincts, however, there was little chance of giving the leader the benefit of the doubt, and in 1923 he reacted by joining the popular anti-Mussolini street protests in Cagliari that had been unleashed by the coup and then, in 1923, by joining the Cagliari Young Communists (FCCI).

In December 1923 his father secured an important promotion which involved the family relocating to Rhodes, which had been ruled as an Italian colony since 1912. Velio was almost 19 by this point, however, and did not accompany his parents. Instead he moved to Rome and in Summer 1924 enrolled at the university there to study for a degree in Jurisprudence. At around the same time, almost certainly in another part of Rome, the socialist parliamentarian Giacomo Matteotti was kidnapped and murdered by fascist paramilitaries giving rise to widespread revulsion and a rapidly intensifying appreciation of the true nature of Mussolini's fascism. Following his disappearance, almost no one expected he would ever be found alive. His body was found just outside the city a couple of months later. Almost at once Spano joined the Lazio region Young Communists. It was at about the same time that he came across the brilliant philosopher-journalist Antonio Gramsci. They would engage together in long discussions about “The Sardinian question”. Spano would later recall he owed his life-long commitment to communism, at least in part, to these discussions with Gramsci.

=== Young militant ===
Early in 1925 Spano took on the leadership of the University Communist Group at Rome, jointly with Altiero Spinelli. His activism did not go unnoticed by the security services on the group and in 1926, at the invitation of the party there, he moved to Turin, and industrial city with a long-embedded tradition of liberalism and socialism to take on the leadership of the University Communist Group there. He enrolled at the university to continue his studies, but by 1927 had abandoned these. That year he joined the organisational apparatus of the Young Communists (FCCI), which had been an illegal organisation shortly after the Fascist take-over in 1922. Operating, as far as possible, below the radar of officialdom, he identified himself at this time using the code name “Mariano”. By this time he had become, in the words of at least one commentator, a “professional revolutionary” in response to the government's systematic construction of the institutional underpinnings for an authoritarian tyranny including, notably, the so-called ”exceptional laws” (‘’” leggi eccezionali del fascismo"’’) of 1925/26. He was arrested in Turin and sentence to a two month prison term and recommended, at the same time, for some more systematic form of “confinement” that would remove him from antifascist activist. During his two-month imprisonment his case was referred to the government's special court ("Tribunale speciale per la difesa dello Stato") in Rome, which was invited to consider his role in the (illegal) reconstitution of the ”Communist Party of Italy”. The special court delivered the outcome of their deliberations on 12 April 1928 and imposed on him a sentence amounting to a further five years and five months for “communist association and propaganda”. The total sentence handed down was set at six years. Spano's prison experiences are known primarily through what he himself said and wrote of them. He tried to grasp the opportunities for personal and political development presented, writing of the experience to his family in 1930, “I have not lost a single centimeter of my stature”.

=== French exile, Egyptian assignment ===
In 1932, as part of a more general amnesty announced the previous month to celebrate the first ten years of fascism in Italy, 639 of the 1,056 prisoners formally classified as political prisoners were released. Velio Spano was one of those released. In January 1933 he became aware that the authorities again searching for him with a warrant for his capture, however, and decided to emigrate to France.

Through 1933 Paris was rapidly becoming an informal headquarters for exiled communists from Italy and Germany. Spano became part of the illegal organisation abroad of the Italian Communist Party, taking charge of the section handling management and liaison in respect of Italian emigrant workers. In October 1934 he teamed up with the French polymath-philosopher Romain Rolland and others to launch a call for the release of Antonio Gramsci whose health had deteriorated steadily and alarmingly since his arrested and imprisonment by the Italian authorities in November 1926. Gramsci enjoyed a formidable reputation among Europe's left-wing intellectual elite, which was particularly well represented in France, and the campaign for his release, and for an international delegation to be permitted to visit Italy in order to make a determination of the conditions under which political prisoners were being held, gained significant traction.

By November 1935 Spano was in Egypt, having been sent by in the party to undertake a propaganda assignment among the Italian troops advancing across Libya towards Suez to discourage British intervention in the intensifying Abyssinian War. For this mission he used the francophone cover name “Paul Conibet”. Between 1935 and 1937 he then undertook a number of further clandestine visits to Italy on behalf of the exiled party leadership in Paris, this time using the cover name “Renzo Lojacono” with the recurring objective of trying to maintain a certain level of organised antifascist activity, principally in Naples and Rome.

=== The Spanish war ===
In December 1936 Spano was sent by the party to Barcelona to contribute to the antifascist struggles in the Spanish Civil War which had broken out six months earlier. He joined the “interbrigadistas” being set up in Spain by the Comintern. His initial focus was on political broadcasting, for which he displayed an exceptional set of abilities, initially in Barcelona and later in Madrid from where, starting in February 1937, to was placed in charge of “Radio Milano Libera”, a wholly Italian language station targeting the Italian army units sent by Mussolini to fight alongside Franco's ”nationalist” forces. There was also a clear intention, given the frequencies used, that the station's antifascist political messages should be heard in Italy, where it was not always so easy to deliver antifascist messages through the broadcast media from closer to home. On the evidence of the number of people arrested in Italy on suspicion of listening to the “Radio Milano Libera” transmissions sent across from Madrid, it appears that the station attracted a significant listenership.

Towards the end of 1937 Spano returned to Paris where a focus of his energies was on political j0urnalism through the print media. He took on co-directorship, with the Torinese Mario Montagnana, for l'Unità, the party's mass-circulation daily newspaper which had been banned by the Italian government in 1926, but of which clandestine copies were nevertheless produced, not always with the same frequency, in Milan, Turin, Rome and Paris between 1927 and 1944 (when regular daily publication resumed).

Through most of 1938 he was also intensively engaged in political work in support of popular front activities. During the summer of 1938 he organised a “party school” near Longwy, in the mining region of northern Lorraine, with Luigi Vitobello.

=== Tunisia ===
In October 1938 the party sent Spano to Tunisia. Tunisia had been a “French protectorate” since 1881 in the context of the so-called nineteenth century European “scramble for Africa”. French control over Tunisia had been an ongoing source of tension between France and Italy from the outset, reflecting longstanding colonial rivalries. Commercial ties across the Mediterranean had existed for centuries, and during the second half of the nineteenth century Tunisia had been a favourite destination of Tunisian emigrants, so that on many streets the Italian language was as likely to predominate as French. During the 1920s and 1930s, reflecting the wider surge in nationalism, rejection of French “protection” was becoming more widespread across Tunisia itself. In this context, Spano's mission was to strengthen the organisation of antifascist activities among the large Italian expatriate community and strengthen bonds of friendship with the French government in France, which still represented a beacon of freedom and democracy at a time when fascist currents were strengthening across much of Europe. Spano launched an energetic propaganda programme and established contacts with numerous young communist activists from Italy who by this time had found refuge in to Tunisia. These included Maurizio Valenzi, Ruggero Grieco, Nadia Gallico and her sister Diana alongside many others who would have considered themselves members not of the exiled Italian party, but as members of the Tunisian Communist Party which had been established (initially, as a branch of the French party) in 1934. By mobilising extensive support locally in a remarkably short amount of time, Spano was able to establish in Tunisia an antifascist daily newspaper called “Il Giornale”, an Italian language newspaper with significant financial backing from Tunisia's Jewish community, which set itself up in opposition to “Unione”, a daily newspaper produced with support from the Italian government. Spano served as editor-in-chief of “Il Giornale”. However, in (probably) 1939, as the international situation deteriorated, the newspaper's assets were seized and publication of it was permanently terminated.

=== Nadia Gallico ===
For much of Europe war broke out during September 1939, although Italian military involvement was deferred until June 1940. The Tunisian Communist Party went underground. Many of Spano's political comrades returned to Italy, seeking to avoid discovery by the authorities there by living “underground”, without registering any place of domicile with a municipality, and never staying in the same place for very long. Spano was keen to do the same, but was persuaded by the party leadership that he could be more helpful to the cause by remaining in Tunisia. Meanwhile, shortly after arriving in Tunisia in 1938 he had met Nadia Gallico, a lawyer's daughter who had grown up in Tunisia as a member of the Italian community and as part of a family that was avowedly pro-communist and anti-fascist. They married in May 1939: Nadia Gallico Spano played a leading role in Spano's task of organising antifascist resistance in Tunisia and subsequently proved a powerful source of life-long personal and political support. I due course Nadia also gave birth to the couple's three recorded daughters.

=== Sbeitla ===
Early during 1940 Spano was arrested and detained, together with other Italian communists, in the “concentration camp” at Sbeitla. He was held there until Paris fell to the Germans in June 1940, which generated delight among some of the more vocal Tunisian nationalist but also, in political terms, ushered in a period of increased uncertainty for the territory. Nadia Gallico Spano also spent time confined at the Sbeitla camp which later, she memorably described. Security did not depend on high fences and guard dogs: it was “a location on the edge of the desert. Not so much a concentration camp as a vast stretch of abandoned ground, without even one building, and defined by a line which it was prohibited to cross. Anyone who did so, even without meaning to, risked being shot without warning”.

=== Tunisian Communist Party ===
During 1941 Velio Spano reorganised the Tunisian Communist Party to take account of the changed circumstances. With many comrades having quietly slipped across to Italy he emerged, de facto, in a leadership role within what remained of the party. He established links with the Gollisti, with French socialists, and with the Neo Destour nationalists under Habib Bourguiba. There was a shared enemy: the collaborationist French puppet government at Vichy in central France. In November 1941, following betrayal by an informant, most of the remaining leading figures in the Tunisian Communist Party were arrested. During the trial that followed Velio Spano managed to escape. He was nevertheless convicted in absentia and sentenced to death. The verdict and sentence were restated March 1942 and again in June 1942. The basis for it was the determination that he had “reconstituted a party that had been dissolved and disseminated propaganda based on words supplied from Moscow through the Comintern.

Despite the best endeavours of the police, who were answerable to the Vichy government for as long as Tunisia retained the status of a “French” protectorate, Spano managed to avoid recapture. During November 1942 Tunisia began to fill with German and Italian armies, as Tunisia was drawn into the wider North African campaign. Spano was able to undertake intense clandestine “political work” among members of Italy's conscript armies, organising little secret cells of communists and distributing anti-fascist newspapers. In December 1942 he even managed to arrange and address a conference of top Communist Party officials. Five months later, in early May 1943, Tunisia was liberated by British and American forces, while many surviving members of the Italian army disappeared or became prisoners of war. In Rome some ten weeks later, the king finally ordered the arrest of Mussolini. In Tunisia it was no longer necessary to live in hiding. On 16 October 1942 Velio Spano arrived by plane in Naples. Two and a half weeks earlier, with American forces approaching from the south and high-profile fascist leaders escaping towards the north, the city had effectively liberated itself. Nadia joined him in March 1944, while their two (still very small) daughters remained in Tunisia with their grandmother until December 1945.

=== Italian liberation ===
At the time of Spano's return to Italy during the second half of 1943 the country was being progressively liberated from the south by U.S. and English armies from abroad and by Italian partisan brigades partisan brigades from within. English-language historiography tends to downplay the Italian contribution to the country's liberation from fascism while an opposite tendency is apparent in many Italian-language sources. To the frustration of the partisans everything ground to a halt during the winter of 1943/44 due to the reluctance of the foreign invaders to engage in mountain warfare mountains through the winter, so Rome was liberated only in June 1944, by which time the Germans, having “rescued” Mussolini in September 1943, had installed him as the nominal leader of the so-called “Italian Social Republic”. The Italian Civil War fought out against this background is generally considered to have continued from September 1943 until May 1945. In Naples, Spano joined up with Eugenio Reale, Marcello Marroni and Clemente Maglietta to take on the leadership of the Communist Party which, based in Naples, they were able to reinstate in the liberated south of Italy. (Palmiro Togliatti, the party's longstanding leader between, by some criteria, 1927 and 1964, would not return from Moscow until 1944, but contacts were maintained between Spano and Togliatti through French Communist Party channels.) A period of energetic work on party organisation ensued, with a focus on the need to create a unified party base soundly rooted in healthy patriotic values, able to accommodate militants and pragmatists across the entire liberated south. In December 1943 Spano took charge of a southern edition of l'Unità, the party's daily newspaper, though it was only in March 1944 after seventeen years of clandestine small-scale publication, that the Neapolitan edition of l’Unità became “legal”. In January 1944 he participated at Bari in the congress of the “Comitato di Liberazione Nazionale” (National Liberation Committee / CLN) at which, together with Reale, he aligned the Communist Party with the socialists and the ”actionists” in refusing to participate in any provisional government unless and until the king abdicated. Others present took a yet more radical position, insisting not merely that the king should abdicate, but that the monarchy should be abolished. As far as the Communist Party was concerned, the demand in support of immediate abdication was softened abruptly with the arrival in Naples of Palmiro Togliatti on 27 March 1944.

In April 1944 Spano participated prominently in Sicily at the first post-liberation party congress, intervening forcefully to confront separatist currents within the party. He was similarly uncompromising in confronting separatism in the party in Sardinia and in Calabria.

=== After the liberation ===
In July 1944 Spano became part of the provisional directorate established for the so-called party “operativa” in anticipation of a liberated Italy It was also in July 1944, following the liberation of Rome the previous month, the Spano accepted the directorship of the newspaper l'Unità, responsible now for the Rome edition for the next two years. In May 1945 he attended the party's second regional congress in Sardinia on behalf of the national directorate and repeated his urgings not to focus on the “autonomy” agenda to the exclusion of the pressing need for social reforms. On 8 August 1945 he participated as a member at the inaugural meeting of the provisional leadership team for the “Consulta nazionale” (‘’loosely, “national council”’’) set up on the basis of a royal decree dated 5 April 1945 (‘’” Decreto legislativo luogotenenziale 5 aprile 1945, n. 146”’’) on the basis of an initiative from post-fascist political leadership groups that had emerged in Rome and Milan. Following the abolition of the monarchy in June/July 1946, Velio Spano served as an under-secretary at the Agriculture Ministry in the short-lived first government of the Italian Republic. Meanwhile in December 1945, at the fifth national congress of the Communist Party, Spano was elected to membership of the Party Central Committee and, within it, to the party directorate, remaining in post till the ninth national congress.

For more than a decade Spano’s political career straddled both Sardinian politics and national politics, based in Rome. His own home base remained in Sardinia till 1953, when he relocated his family to Rome. He served as a member of the Constituent Assembly in Sardinia between 1947 and 1957 and was party secretary for the Sardinian party branch. He was prominently involved in the turbulent social and political developments during the later 1940s on the island, notably in respect of farm worker uprisings and land occupations. He was also involved in the bitter 72 day miners’ strike against the Carbosarda organisation at Carbonia in 1948. Workers’ Council members were subjected to a succession of police arrests. Spano himself was arrested in September 1948, but due to his parliamentary immunity he had to be released. He therefore took a lead in the negotiations while other strike leaders remained behind bars, and remained closely engaged on the progressive side of the arguments in the socio-political battles which, if not fully resolved, began to be softened during the 1950s in the context of a remarkable – if conspicuously uneven – improvement in the economic condition of the entire country.

Following the elections of 18 April 1948 Spano was appointed to membership of the senate, the upper house of the bicameral legislature of the new Italian Republic. He remained a senator, selected for the “Guspini-Iglesias” electoral district in Sardinia and reconfirmed through successive elections, for the rest of his life.

In August 1949 Spano accepted a party request that he should visit the newly relaunched People's Republic of China following more than two decades of intermittent civil war. He arrived in September and stayed in the country until 1950, acting both as an envoy, selected for the task by Palmiro Togliatti, the leader of the Italian Communist Party and as a correspondent for the party newspaper, l'Unità. Starting in October 1949, he sent back a series of reports which were gathered together on his return and published in a single volume in March 1950.

The China trip presaged a more permanent development. In 1956 Spano was given a leading role in the party's foreign affairs section. This was the background to his appointment in 1958 as secretary to the “Italian Peace Movement” and thereby a vice-president at the World Peace Council . Nevertheless, after Stalin died, and as the contents of so-called “secret speech” spilled across from Moscow, to be followed by what optimists termed the Khrushchev Thaw in east–west relations, by 1961 Spano found himself in passionate and increasingly open disagreement with party leader Palmiro Togliatti on their respective attitude to the Soviet Union and on the extent to which Soviet-inspired communism could be considered compatible with Italian notions of parliamentary democracy. These differences left Spano increasingly sidelined when it came to in the party's foreign policy. The principle exception concerned the African continent, in which Spano, encouraged by his Tunisian-born wife, had taken a particular interest ever since his Tunisian exile during the later Mussolini years. He took a close interest in the decolonisation process which was accelerating in various parts of Africa during the later 1950s and early 1960s. His 1960 book “Risorgimento africano” reflected his close attention to these developments though his later years.

Velio Spano died from cancer at Rome on 7 October 1964.

== Output (selection) ==
- Guadalajara. 8-23 marzo 1937, Parigi, Edizioni di coltura sociale, 1937.
- I comunisti italiani e l'unità nazionale contro l'invasore, Napoli, Ed. Stalin (Soc. Tip. Anonima Libraria Italia Nuova), 1943.
- Il partito della classe operaia, Edizioni del Partito Comunista Italiano, 1944.
- Alla conquista di Cagliari. La marcia dei comunisti cagliaritani dal 1921 al 1947, Cagliari, a cura delle sezioni comuniste di Cagliari, 1947.
- Roma o Mosca? Riproduzione riassuntiva del contraddittorio fra Padre Lombardi e l'On. Sen. Velio Spano tenutosi in Cagliari il 4-12-1948 sul tema: cristianesimo o comunismo, Cagliari, Tip. Fadda, 1949.
- Ciò che ho visto nella Cina popolare. Testo stenografico della conferenza tenuta il 26 febbraio 1950 al teatro Alfieri di Torino da V. S. di ritorno dal suo lungo viaggio nella Repubblica popolare cinese, Torino, Tip. Ti. Po, Tipografia Popolare, 1950.
- Nella Cina di Mao Ze-Tun, Milano. Milano-Sera, 1950.
- Il banditismo sardo e i problemi della rinascita, Roma, Editori riuniti, 1954.
- Risorgimento africano, Roma, Editori riuniti, 1960.
- Per l'unità del popolo sardo, Cagliari, Edizioni della torre, 1978.
