= Alma Sabatini =

Italian essayist, linguist, teacher and feminist activist

- Born: 6 September 1922; Rome, Italy
- Died: 12 April 1988 (aged 65); Rome, Italy
- Education: Sapienza University of Rome
- Occupations: Essayist, linguist, teacher, feminist activist

Alma Sabatini (born in Rome, 6 September 1922 – died in Rome, 12 April 1988) was an Italian essayist, linguist, teacher and feminist activist. She was engaged in several human rights campaigns.

== Biography ==
Sabatini was born in Rome, Italy on 6 September 1922 to a wealthy family. Her father died when she was seven years old. She graduated from Sapienza University of Rome in 1945 with a degree in Italian Literature and obtained fellowships to study English in the United States and Liverpool, United Kingdom. Following that, she taught English at primary and secondary schools in Rome; in 1979, however, she decided to retire and to completely dedicate the last years of her life to the feminist movement.

Sabatini married Professor Robert Braun after a long time of common law marriage. She and her husband died in Rome on 12 April 1988 in a car crash. The nonreligious funeral rites were celebrated at the International Women House in via Della Lungara, Rome.

== Politic and social works ==
Militant in the Radical Party in the 1960s, in 1971 Sabatini was one of founders of the Movement for the Liberation of Women (Italian: Movimento di Liberazione della Donna, or MLD), as well as its first President. The Movement backed the legalisation of abortion and fought against sexism and the patriarchy. In the middle of the same year, with some other activists, she abandoned the Movement to create a consciousness group and to discuss sexuality and personal experiences. On 8 March 1972, during an authorised demonstration in Campo de' Fiori Square in Rome, Sabatini sustained a head injury after a police raid, and she was admitted to emergency room. During one of the consciousness meetings, journalist Gabriella Parca suggested starting a magazine, then known as Effe. Effe was printed from 1973; Sabatini contributed to the publication for a few years.

In the same period, Sabatini came into contact with the Feminist Movement Collective of via Pompeo Magno, which then became the Roman Feminist Movement. She contributed to the distribution of monthly informative bulletins and participated in initiatives and demonstrations against prostitution and for the legalisation of abortion. In 1973, she adopted the practice of self-denunciation as a sign of sympathy for Gigliola Pierobon, who was tried for having undergone an abortion.

Following an extensive exchange of correspondence with American feminist figures including Diana Russell, Marcia Keller, Karen DeCrow and Betty Friedan, Sabatini had the chance to visit several cities in the United States and take part in conferences, meetings and interviews between 1971 and 1972, as a proponent of Italian feminism.

== Contributions on gender issues ==
Sabatini's work has been published in magazines (Effe and Quotidiano Donna), where she has addressed issues of abortion, maternity, sexuality, equal opportunities, prostitution, and marriage.

Her name remains mainly tied to an essay about sexism in the Italian language, Raccomandazioni per un uso non sessista della lingua italiana.

In 1986, on behalf of the National Commission for Equal Opportunities between women and men, established by the Presidency of the Council of Ministers, she curated Il sessismo nella lingua italiana (Sexism in the Italian language), a set of guidelines addressed to schools and to the scholastic publishing industry, to propose the elimination of gender stereotypes from the Italian language. After a study on terminology used in textbooks and in mass-media, Sabatini highlighted the predominance of the masculine gender in Italian generic third person pronouns (the so-called neutral masculine), that deleted the presence of feminine subjects from speeches. She underlined the lack of institutional words with a feminine inflection (ministra [minister], sindaca [mayor], assessora [councilor], etc.), and the consideration allowed to a masculine word, but not to its feminine equivalent.

Sabatini has stated: "The theoretical reasons behind this work are not only that the language reflects the society that speaks it, but also that it influences and limits its thinking, imagination, and cultural and social development". Despite the criticism received, her work opened a discussion about the need for innovation in the Italian language, which has recently involved the Accademia della Crusca.

== Works ==
- Sabatini, Alma; Mariani, Marcella; Billi, Edda; Santangelo, Alda (1993). "Il sessismo nella lingua italiana" (PDF). funzionepubblica.gov.it. Archived from the original (PDF) on 14 July 2015.

== Bibliography ==
- Documenti d'archivio del Fondo Alma Sabatini conservato a Roma presso Archivia - Archivi, Biblioteche e Centri di documentazione delle donne. http://www.archiviaabcd.it/
- Donnità : cronache del Movimento Femminista Romano, Roma, Centro di documentazione del Movimento Femminista Romano, 1976
- Mi piace vestirmi di rosso, DVD ideato e realizzato da Edda Billi, Marina del Vecchio, Paola Mastrangeli e Giovanna Olivieri 2012
