= Nadia Gallico Spano =

Italian politician (1916–2006)

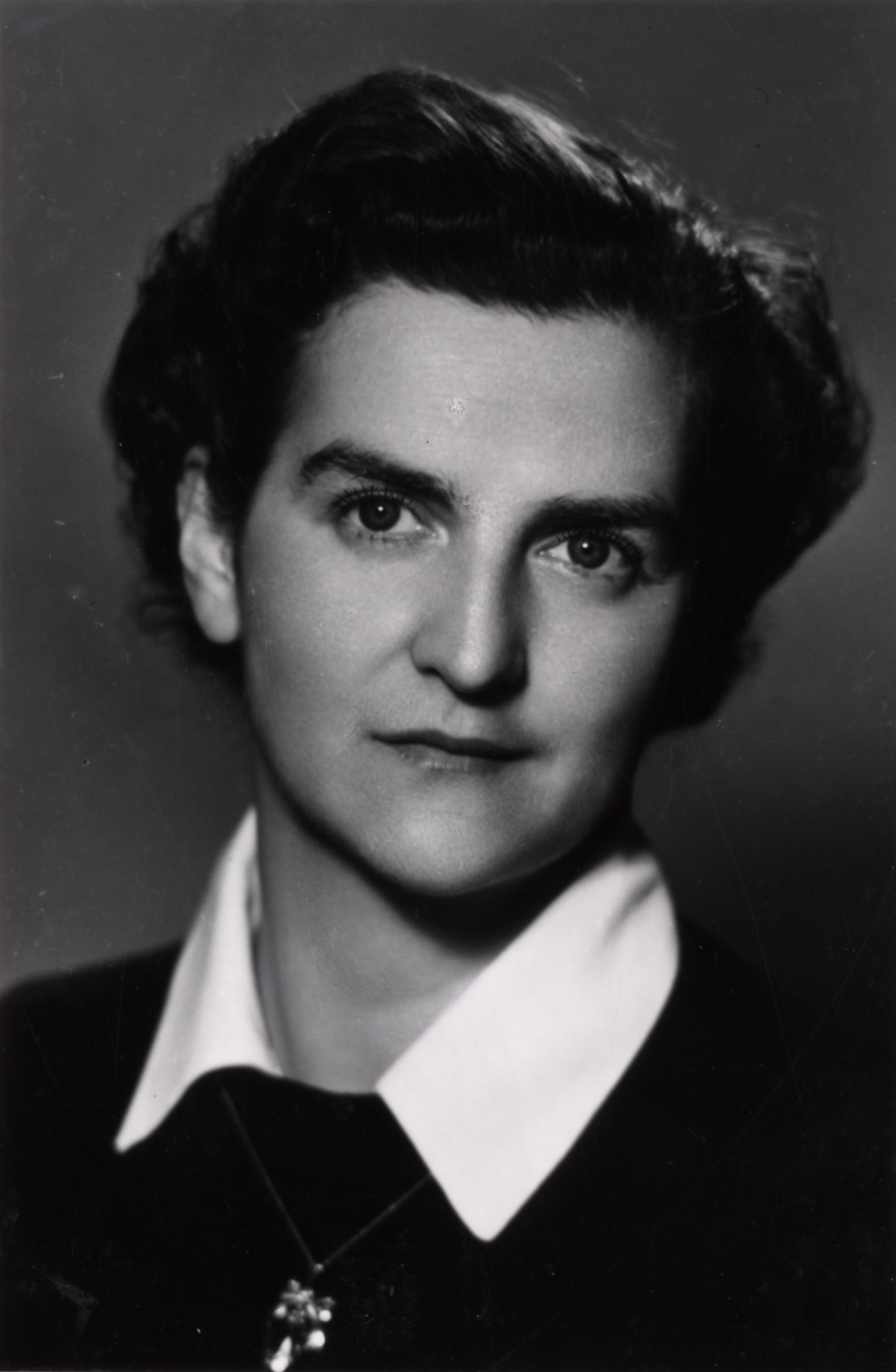
- Official portrait, 1948

Member of the Chamber of Deputies
- In office 1948–1958
- Constituency: Cagliari

Member of the Constituent Assembly
- In office 1946–1948
- Constituency: Rome

Personal details
- Born: Nadia Gallico; 2 June 1916 Tunis, French Tunisia
- Died: 19 January 2006 (aged 89) Rome, Italy
- Party: Italian Communist Party
- Spouse: Velio Spano (m. 1940; died 1964)
- Children: 3
- Education: Sapienza University of Rome
- Occupation: Politician

Nadia Gallico Spano (née Gallico; 2 June 1916 – 19 January 2006) was an Italian politician. She was elected to the Constituent Assembly in 1946 as one of the first group of women parliamentarians in Italy. In 1948 she was elected to the Chamber of Deputies, which she remained a member of until 1958.

== Biography ==
Nadia Gallico was born in Tunis in 1916 to a family of Italian emigrants. She was educated at a catholic school and later studied at the Faculty of Chemistry in Rome. Back in Tunisia, she became involved in anti-fascist activities. In 1940 she married Velio Spano, an Italian Communist Party (PCI) leader sent to Tunis to support the anti-fascists. The couple had two daughters, Paola and Chiara. Spano returned to Italy in October 1943, with Nadia following a few months later.

Gallico Spano subsequently became involved in the women's section of the PCI and the Noi donne magazine. Following World War II she was amongst the founders of the Union of Italian Women. She was a PCI candidate in Rome in the 1946 elections and was one of 21 women elected. Elected to the Chamber of Deputies in the 1948 and 1953 elections from Cagliari, she served in parliament until 1958, during which she had a third daughter, Francesca.

She died in Rome in 2006 shortly after publishing her autobiography, Mabrúk.
