= Maria Antonietta Macciocchi =

Italian politician and journalist

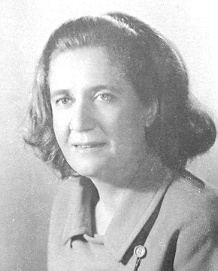
- Born: 23 July 1922; Isola del Liri, Italy
- Died: 15 April 2007 (aged 84); Rome, Italy
- Education: Degree in Philosophy and Letters
- Occupations: lecturer, journalist, writer
- Known for: Member of the Italian Parliament and European Parliament
- Political party: PCI (1943-1977); Radical (from 1979)
- Other political affiliations: Patto Segni (1994)

Maria Antonietta Macciocchi (23 July 1922 – 15 April 2007) was an Italian journalist, writer, feminist and politician, elected to the Italian Parliament in 1968 as an Italian Communist Party candidate and to the European Parliament in 1979 as a candidate of the Radical Party.

== Life ==
Macciocchi was born in Isola del Liri, the child of anti-fascists. She joined the underground Italian Communist Party (PCI) during the German occupation of Rome. She became editor of the party's magazine Vie Nuove in November 1956 which she held until November 1961. Then she edited a feminist magazine financed by the PCI, Noi donne. She joined l'Unità, the paper founded by Antonio Gramsci, becoming their foreign correspondent in Algiers and Paris. In the 1960s she lectured at Vincennes University France, and her book Pour Gramsci was credited with introducing Gramsci's thought to French intellectuals.

Returning to Italy in 1968 to stand in the general election as a candidate for Naples, she kept up a correspondence with Louis Althusser about both working-class conditions and local party management. Though elected, her publication of the correspondence helped to ensure that the PCI did not put her forward for re-election in 1972. She travelled to China for l'Unità, praising the Cultural Revolution in the resultant book, Dalla Cina: dopo la rivoluzione culturale. In 1977 she was expelled from the PCI for supporting Maoists in Bologna.

In 1979 she was elected Member of the European Parliament (MEP) for the Radical Party.

== Global correspondent ==
Macciocchi alternated work as an MEP to that of a journalist, writing for major newspapers such as Corriere della Sera, Le Monde and El País articles from the most diverse parts of the world, from Cambodia to Iran and Jerusalem. In 1992, the French President François Mitterrand awarded her the Legion of Honor. In the same year, she met Pope John Paul II and was fascinated by his charismatic personality. She wrote about the Pope in Le donne secondo Wojtyla ("Women according to Wojtyla"), an unexpected book that aroused more controversy for her "conversion" from admirer of Mao Zedong to admirer of the Pope.

== Later activities ==
In the 1990s Macciocchi lessened her journalistic activities in order to concentrate on book writing. She published works devoted to the history of Naples at the end of the 1700s and the events of the Neapolitan Republic. In 1993 she published 'Cara Eleonora' dedicated to Eleonora Fonseca Pimentel, and in 1998 came 'L'amante della rivoluzione', on the figure of Luisa Sanfelice.

In the European elections of 1994 Macciocchi was a candidate for parliament in the lists of the Patto Segni, but was not elected.

== Works ==
- Persia in lotta [Iran in struggle], edizioni di Cultura Sociale 1952
- Lettere dall'interno del P.C.I. a Louis Althusser, Feltrinelli 1969. Translated by Stephen M. Hellman as Letters from inside the Italian Communist Party to Louis Althusser, 1973.
- Dalla Cina : dopo la rivoluzione culturale, Feltrinelli 1971. Translated by Alfred Ehrenfeld and Frank Kehl as Daily Life in Revolutionary China, 1972
- Polemiche sulla Cina, Feltrinelli 1972
- Per Gramsci, Il Mulino 1974
- La donna "nera": Consenso femminile e fascismo, Feltrinelli 1976
- Éléments pour une analyse du fascisme: séminaire de Maria-A. Macciocchi, Paris III-Vincennes, 1974–1975, 1976
- La sexualité féminine dans l'idéologie fasciste, Tel Quel No. 66 (1976), pp. 26–42
- La talpa francese, Feltrinelli 1977
- De la France, 1977
- Après Marx, Book of the Espresso avril, 1978
- Pasolini, Grasset Paris 1980
- Duemila anni di felicità, Mondadori 1983
- Di là dalle porte di bronzo, mondadori 1987
- La donna con la valigia, Oscar Mondadori 1989
- La forza degli italiani, Mondadori 1990
- Le donne secondo Wojtyla, Edizioni Paoline 1992
- Cara Eleonora: Passione e morte della Fonseca Pimentel nella Rivoluzione napoletana, Rizzoli 1993
- L'amante della rivoluzione. La vera storia di Luisa sanfelica e della Repubblica napoletana del 1799, mondadori 1997

== Bibliography ==
- Eleonora Selvi, "Marie Antoinette Macciocchi.'s Intellectual heretic", Arachne, Rome 2012.
