= Jean Castellini =

Counsellor of Finance and Economy of Monaco
- In office 26 December 2012 – September 2023
- Monarch: Albert II
- Preceded by: Marco Piccinini
- Succeeded by: Marco Piccinini

Personal details
- Born: 21 January 1968 (age 58)
- Children: 3
- Education: École des Hautes Études Commerciales

Jean Castellini (born 21 January 1968) is a Monegasque businessman and civil servant.

Castellini was Counsellor of Finance and Economy from December 2012 to September 2023.

Castellini graduated from École des Hautes Études Commerciales and from Haas School of Business, Berkeley. He was Councillor in the Prince's Cabinet from 2006 to 2007, and secretary general of the Commission for the Control of Financial Activities from 2007 to 2009. He was managing director of Monegasque Safra Bank from 2009 until his appointment as Counsellor of Finance and Economy.

== Personal life ==
Castellini is married, and he has three children.
