= Pierre-André Chiappori =

French-Monacan economist

Counsellor of Finance and Economy of Monaco
- In office 18 March 2024 – 1 April 2026
- Monarch: Albert II
- Preceded by: Marco Piccinini
- Succeeded by: Frédéric Cottalorda

Personal details
- Education: École normale supérieure Université Paris I Panthéon-Sorbonne
- Occupation: Economist; Professor

Pierre-André Chiappori is a French-Monégasque economist who is currently the E. Rowan and Barbara Steinschneider Professor of Economics at Columbia University. His research focuses on household behavior, general equilibrium and mathematical economics.

He was the Counsellor of Finance and Economy from 18 March 2024 to 1 April 2026.

== Education ==
Chiappori studied at the École normale supérieure in Paris between 1974 and 1979. During that period, he also studied at various Parisian universities, receiving degrees in mathematics, statistics, and economics. He graduated with a Ph.D. in economics from the Université Paris I Panthéon-Sorbonne in 1981.

== Career ==
Chiappori's first academic post was as an assistant professor at his alma mater, the Paris 1 Panthéon-Sorbonne University. He then became a maître de conférences at the École des hautes études en sciences sociales in 1985, followed by an appointment at the CNRS and the École Polytechnique. He became a professor of economics at the ENSAE in 1992, while simultaneously serving as a senior researcher at the CNRS. He left France to take up a professorship at the University of Chicago in 1997, and took up his current position at Columbia University in 2005, after serving for a year as a visiting professor at Columbia.

He has served as an editor of various journals, including the Review of Economics of the Household, the Journal of Political Economy and the Journal of the European Economic Association.

He was elected a Fellow of the Econometric Society in 1995, and as a Fellow of the European Economic Association and 2004. In 2015 he was made a Fellow of the Society for the Advancement of Economic Theory.

In Monaco, he had chaired the scientific council of the Monegasque Institute of Statistics and Economic Studies since 2011, and he was also a member of the advisory board of International University of Monaco. Prince of Monaco appointed him as the Counsellor of Finance and Economy on 18 March 2024. He was succeeded by Frédéric Cottalorda on 1 April 2026.

== Selected works ==
- Chiappori, Pierre-André (1988). "Rational Household Labor Supply". Econometrica. 56 (1): 63–90. doi:10.2307/1911842. JSTOR 1911842.
- Chiappori, Pierre-André (1992). "Collective Labor Supply and Welfare". Journal of Political Economy. 100 (3): 437–467. doi:10.1086/261825. S2CID 154976054.
- Chiappori, Pierre-André; Oreffice, Sonia; Quintana-Domeque, Climent (2012). "Fatter Attraction: Anthropometric and Socioeconomic Matching on the Marriage Market". Journal of Political Economy. 120 (4): 659–695. doi:10.1086/667941. S2CID 3048153.
- Chiappori, Pierre-André; Dias, Monica Costa; Meghir, Costas (2018). "The Marriage Market, Labor Supply, and Education Choice". Journal of Political Economy. 126: S26–S72. doi:10.1086/698748. S2CID 219884946.
