= Mariella Gramaglia =

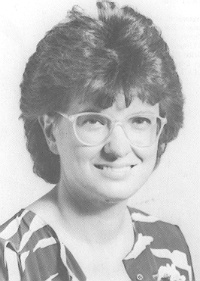

Mariella Gramaglia (4 May 1949 — 15 October 2014) was an Italian left-wing politician and feminist.

== Biography ==
Mariella Gramaglia was one of the leading Italian feminists, active through both journalism and political office. She was a member of the Chamber of Deputies in the 10th legislature and had administrative and political offices in the municipality of Rome during the administration of the mayors Francesco Rutelli and Valter Veltroni.

=== Professional start ===
After graduating very young at the University of Turin, she moved to Rome. She published one of the first collections of feminist texts in Italy, already in 1972. For a few years she taught Literature and Philosophy at the Unitary Experimental High School of Rome and had among her pupils Valerio Magrelli, Fabio Ferzetti, Guglielmo Loy, Riccardo Barenghi, Nicola Pecorini, Daniele Archibugi and Alessandra Baduel.

=== Journalism ===
After a few years, she left teaching to devote herself, under the guidance of Luigi Pintor, to journalism. From 1975 she wrote for Il manifesto where she worked on gender equality issues and civil rights. She followed with passion the debate on the law on voluntary termination of pregnancy. After Il manifesto, she worked as a political notary for the daily newspaper Il Lavoro in Genoa, then directed by Giuliano Zincone. Subsequently, she was a regular Rai collaborator of the program "Si dice donna", curated by Tilde Capomazza. And she worked on the Radiotre programs, directed by Enzo Forcella, in particular at the "NoiVoi Loro Donna" program. In 1983 she eventually became director of Noi Donne.

=== Parliamentary career ===
She was elected to the Chamber of Deputies on June 14, 1987, on the list of the Italian Communist Party in the College of Rome - Viterbo - Latina - Frosinone, she joined the parliamentary group of the independent Left. She remained in office throughout the legislature, which ended on 22 April 1992. She participated in the Social Affairs Commission, presenting numerous bills on social problems, on family status and on the status of women.

=== "Se non ora quando" ===
She was very involved in the feminist movement Se non ora quando (If not now when), which arose in 2011 following the scandals of the then Italian Prime Minister Silvio Berlusconi concerning accusations of frequenting underage prostitutes. On that occasion, Gramaglia collaborated with several other feminists of her generation, including Cristina Comencini, Francesca Comencini, Licia Conte, Silvia Costa, Lidia Ravera, and Serena Sapegno.

== Personal life ==
After her first marriage to Luca Codignola, for a brief period in the early seventies she was romantically linked to the director Nanni Moretti, for whom she acted in the short film Pâté de bourgeois. Her companion was the economist Fernando Vianello, from whom she had a daughter and a son. Her daughter Maddalena Vianello is also involved in gender issues and has published, with her mother, the book Fra me e te.

== Selected works ==
- (editor) La rivoluzione più lunga. Saggi sulla condizione della donna nelle società a capitalismo avanzato (1972). With texts by Juliet Mitchell, Kathy Mcafee, Myrna Wood, Margaret Benston, Laurel Limpus and Jean Rands.
- (with Nadia Fusini), La poesia femminista, (1976).
- Indiana. Nel cuore della democrazia più complicata del mondo, (2008).
- (with Maddalena Vianello) Fra me e te (2013).
