= Effe (magazine) =

Italian feminist magazine (1973–1982)

- Categories: Feminist magazine
- Frequency: Monthly
- Founder: Daniela Colombo; Alma Sabatini
- Founded: 1973
- Final issue: 1982
- Country: Italy
- Based in: Rome
- Language: Italian
- ISSN: 0390-2013
- OCLC: 479215417

Effe was a monthly feminist magazine which was published between 1973 and 1982. It was similar to Ms. Magazine. Effe was headquartered in Rome.

== History and profile ==
Effe was established in 1973. Its stated goal was to provide women with a way to avoid their loneliness. The magazine inspired from the views of American feminist Shulamith Firestone. Daniela Colombo was one of the founders and editors-in-chief of the magazine, which was published on a monthly basis. The other founder was Alma Sabatini. The first editor of Effe was Gabriella Parca. In the 1970s Adele Cambria was among the editors of the magazine, which extensively dealt with the topics of love and affective relationships between couples. For the contributors of the magazine love was an abstract notion as well as a fact of daily life, both heterosexual and homosexual. Effe frequently attacked mainstream women's magazines in Italy.

Effe ceased publication in 1982.
