= Crown Council of Greece =

In the Kingdom of Greece, the Crown Council (Greek: Συμβούλιο του Στέμματος) was an informal advisory body to the King of Greece. It met on several occasions.

It used to be attended by the King, the Prime Minister of Greece, the living former prime ministers, such as the leaders of the parliamentary parties. Other attendants were sometimes called in by the King on advice by the Prime Minister.
