= Department of External Relations (Monaco) =

Monégasque governmental agency

Department of Foreign Affairs and Cooperation of the Principality of Monaco
- Département des Relations Extérieures et de la Coopération
- Coat of arms of Monaco

Agency overview
- Headquarters: Place de la Visitation, MC 98000 MONACO
- Agency executive: Isabelle Berro-Amadeï, Minister of Foreign Affairs and Cooperation
- Website: www.relext.gouv.mc

The Department of Foreign Affairs and Cooperation of the Principality of Monaco (French: Département des Relations Extérieures et de la Coopération) is a governmental agency in Monaco in charge of conducting and designing the foreign policy of the state.

== Organization and structure ==
The Department of Foreign Affairs and Cooperation is responsible for conducting policies related to immunities, diplomatic management and consular affairs, relations with European states and affairs in Europe, international and multilateral affairs and the international environment. The functions of the department are implemented through two divisions of the ministry: Direction of International Cooperation, the Direction of Diplomatic and Consular relations, the Diplomatic Posts and Consulates overseas and Monaco's Representations to International Organisations. The Department of Foreign Affairs and Cooperation is headed by a Minister.

The current Minister for Foreign Affairs and Cooperation is Isabelle Berro-Amadeï.

== See also ==
- Foreign relations of Monaco
- Government of Monaco
