= Department of Finance and Economy (Monaco) =

Department of Finance and Economy of Principality of Monaco
- Département des Finances et de l'Economie
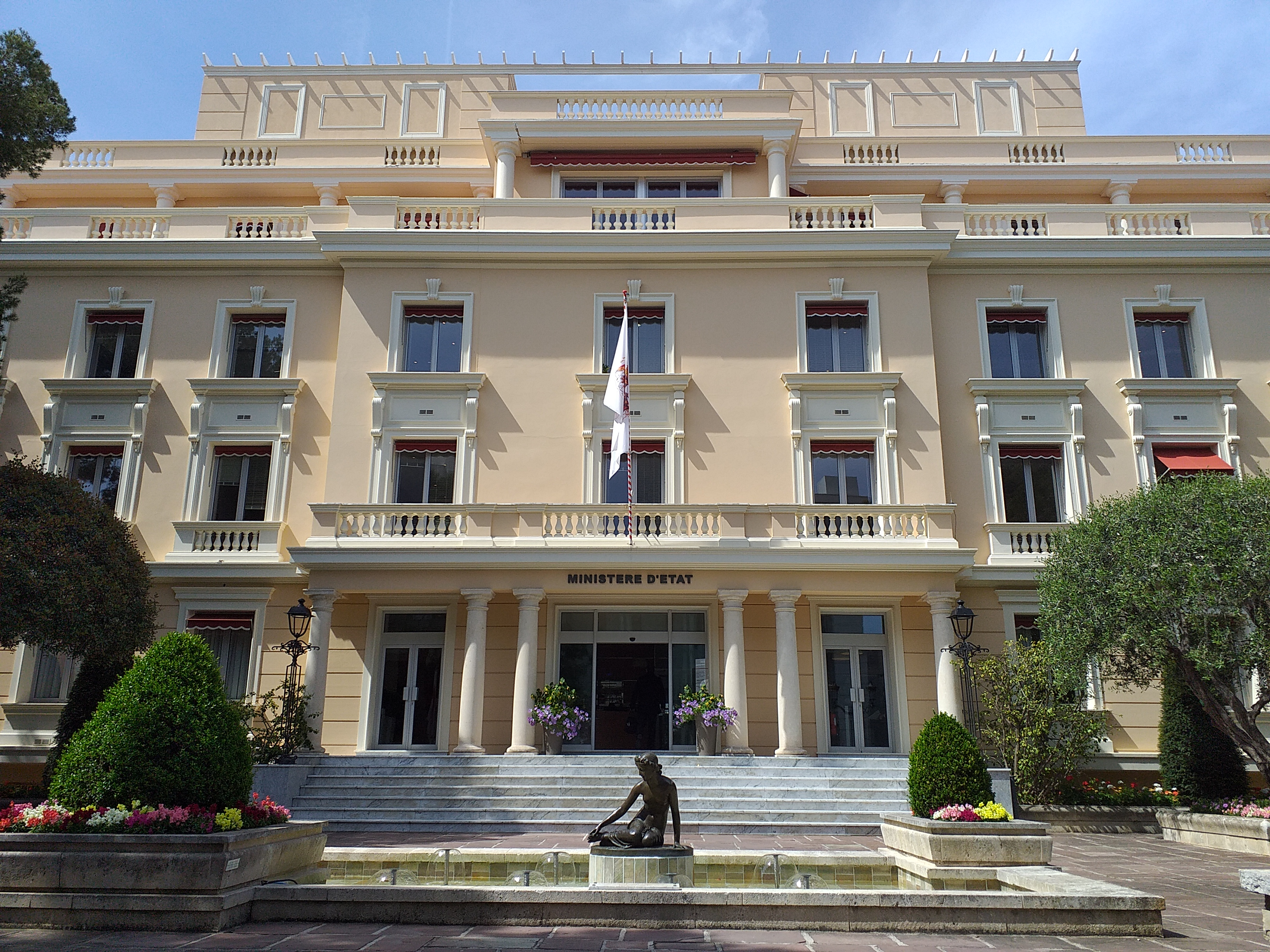

Agency overview
- Headquarters: Place de la Visitation, MC 98000 MONACO
- Agency executive: Pierre-André Chiappori, Government Counsellor for Finance and Economy

The Department of Finance and Economy of Principality of Monaco (French: Département des Finances et de l'Economie) is a governmental agency in Monaco in charge of the public finances of the state. The department is led by the Government Consellor for Finance and Economy.

== Counsellors ==
Counsellor	Term
Alexandre Noghès	?-1920-?
Arthur Crovetto	1949-?
Jacques Reymond	?-1949-1953-?
Jean-Maurice Crovetto	?-1955
Arthur Crovetto	1955-1957-?
Jacques Reymond	?-1957-?
Pierre Notari	1960-1965
Robert Sanmori	1965-1966-?
Pierre Notari	1969-1978-?
Raoul Biancheri	1979-1988
Jean Pastorelli	1988-1995
Henri Fissore	1995-2000
Franck Biancheri	2000-2006
Gilles Tonelli	2006-2009
Sophie Thévenoux	2009-2011
Marco Piccinini	2011-2012
Jean Castellini	2012-2023
Marco Piccinini	2023-2024
Pierre-André Chiappori	2024-

== See also ==
- Council of Government of Monaco
- Economy of Monaco
