= Council of Government of Monaco =

Executive branch of the Monegasque government

Coordinates: 43.7317°N 7.4250°E

Logo of the princely government of Monaco

The Council of Government (French: Conseil de gouvernement) of Monaco is the Prince of Monaco's governing body, consisting of six members.

== Portfolios ==
It consists of six members. The Minister of State chairs the council, which includes five other members (four counsellors and one delegate). He also has voting rights, and has control of both the police and military. The Council debates projects and bills proposed to the Prince by the other governmental councils, executive ordinances approved by the Prince, the Minister of State's ministerial orders, and other miscellaneous policy.

The other portfolios are:

- Counsellor for Internal Affairs
- Counsellor for Finance and Economy
- Counsellor for Public Works, the Environment and Urban Planning
- Counsellor for Social Affairs and Health
- Counsellor for Foreign Relations and Cooperation

The Council debates projects and bills proposed to the Prince by the other governmental councils, executive ordinances approved by the Prince, the Minister of State's ministerial orders, and other miscellaneous policy.

== Current composition ==
Composition as of 21 July 2025.
Department	Name	In office since
Minister of State	Christophe Mirmand	21 July 2025
Internal Affairs	Lionel Beffre	5 August 2024
Finance and Economy	Pierre-André Chiappori	18 March 2024
Social Affairs and Health	Christophe Robino	20 April 2022
Public Works, the Environment and Urban Planning	Céline Caron-Dagioni	1 September 2021
Foreign Relations and Cooperation	Isabelle Berro-Amadeï	17 January 2022
