= Marie-Pierre Gramaglia =

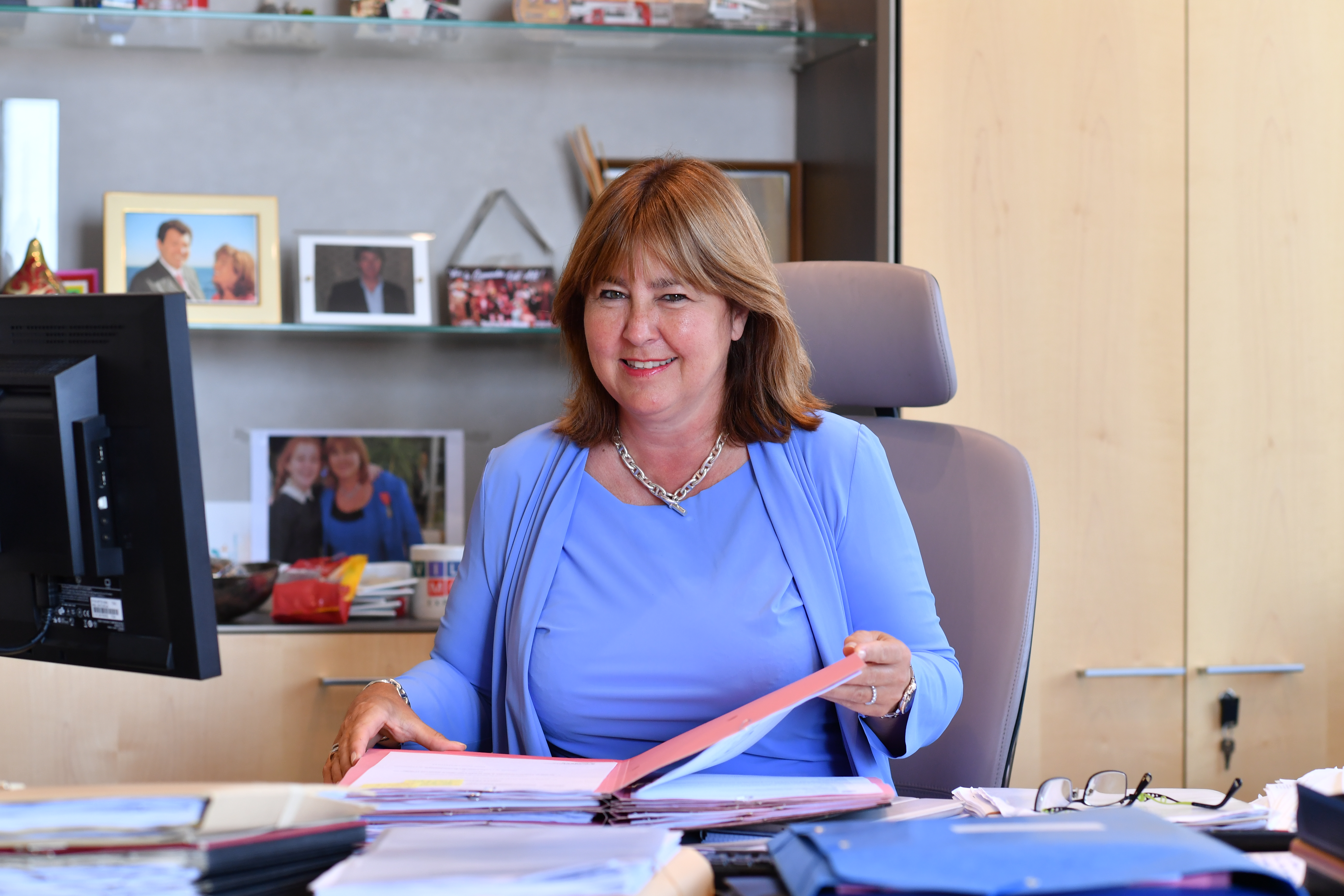

Marie-Pierre Gramaglia is a Monegasque politician, Counsellor of the Ministry of Equipment, Environment, and Urban Planning of Monaco between 2011 and 2021.

== Education ==
Gramaglia possesses a DEA in international public and private law, a DESS in notarial law, a higher diploma in notarial studies, and a diploma from the Center for International Intellectual Property Studies.

== Career ==
Gramaglia has served in Monaco's civil service in a variety of functions since 1993. In 2001 she was named deputy director of the Business Development Agency, and in 2005 she became a technical advisor in the Ministry of Finance and Economy. Beginning in 2008 she served as the director of electronic communications, and in 2010 she joined a working group designed to facilitate Monaco's economic development. She was appointed to the Council of Government on 15 January 2011. In 2013 she announced plans for the development of a new neighborhood, the "Éco-Quartier", to be built on reclaimed land along the Monegaasque coast.

She addressed the United Nations Climate Change Conference in 2017, on the subject of greenhouse gas emissions; she had previously addressed the same body in 2013, and has shown herself during her ministerial career to be particularly concerned with environmental issues and matters affecting women entrepreneurs.

She is the second woman in Monaco's history to be appointed to the council, behind Sophie Thevenoux, who served as Counsellor of Finance and Economy from 2009 to 2011.
