= Crown Council of Monaco =

Formal body of advisers to the Prince of Monaco

The Crown Council (French: Conseil de la Couronne; Monégasque: Cunsiyu d’a Curuna) of Monaco is a seven-member administrative body which meets at least twice annually to advise the prince of Monaco on various domestic and international affairs. It is one of three such councils designated by the Constitution of Monaco, along with the National Council (Conseil national) and the Communal Council (Conseil communal).

== Membership ==
There are seven total members of the Crown Council. The Prince appoints the council's president and three other members; the final three members are chosen amongst candidates put forward by the National Council.

=== Current members ===
- Michel Boeri (President)
- Frédéric Sangiorgio
- Marie-Pierre Gramaglia
- Patricia Husson
- Guy Magnan
- Jean-Michel Cucchi
- Nathalie Aureglia-Caruso

== Affairs ==
Though the Crown Council is simply an advisory committee and has no legislative power, the prince must consult it before signing international treaties, dissolving the National Council, naturalizing citizens, or making certain other executive decisions.

At the end of March 2005, the Crown Council carried out what may have been one of its most far-reaching acts. Rainier III, the sovereign prince since 1949, had for some weeks been seriously ill in hospital in Monaco and the Crown Council established that Rainier was temporarily incapable of ruling. (During the period of Rainier III's incapacity, his doctors in Monaco were agreed that his ill health showed little signs of improving and, agreeing with eminent Parisian doctors who were called to give their independent opinions.)

Then-Hereditary Prince Albert was informed of the Crown Council's incapacity finding regarding Rainier III and, following the Constitution, was duly called upon to rule over Monaco as regent.

The Crown Council noted, nevertheless, that if the health of Rainier III were to improve sufficiently, he would be in a position to re-assume his functions as ruler.

Prince Albert's regency lasted but a few days into April 2005, when Rainier III died at the age of 81. He was then formally succeeded as Monaco's sovereign by Albert in his own right as Prince Albert II.
