= Crown Council of Belgium =

Advisors to Belgian monarch

The Crown Council of Belgium (Dutch: Kroonraad, French: Conseil de la Couronne, German: Kronrat) is composed of the King of the Belgians, the Ministers and the Ministers of State (mostly former ministers and other major politicians). The constitutional Monarch chairs the Crown Council, which has no legal competence but simply advises the crown when consulted on extraordinary matters.

== Working ==
During a session of the Crown Council, the Ministers of State can do nothing but advise the King, as the authority to make political decisions is vested in the King and the Federal Government, in accordance with the Belgian Constitution.

To date, the Crown Council has met on only five occasions:

Date	Reason	Monarch
16 July 1870	The start of the Franco-Prussian War	King Leopold II
2–3 August 1914	The German ultimatum to Belgium at the beginning of World War I	King Albert I
2 May 1919	The Treaty of Versailles	King Albert I
23 March 1950	The Royal Question	King Leopold III
18 February 1960	The independence of Belgian Congo	King Baudouin

== Current use ==
Nowadays, the Crown Council is seen as an old-fashioned or even outdated political organ. The title of Minister of State is given as an honorary title, with no view to any possible Crown Council meeting. None of the living Ministers of State have ever participated in a Crown Council session. During the 2007–08 Belgian government formation though, King Albert II formally asked the help of several Ministers of State with experience in solving political crises. The King consulted Ministers of State Wilfried Martens, Jean-Luc Dehaene, Guy Verhofstadt, Philippe Moureaux, Willy Claes, Gérard Deprez, Jos Geysels, Philippe Busquin, Charles-Ferdinand Nothomb, José Daras, Raymond Langendries, Herman De Croo, Louis Michel, Herman Van Rompuy and Armand De Decker. Some political analysts saw this as comparable to the Crown Council. Commonly, Ministers of State are appointed to formal offices is the process of forming a government or to solve a cabinet crisis.
