= Christophe Mirmand =

Minister of State of Monaco since 2025

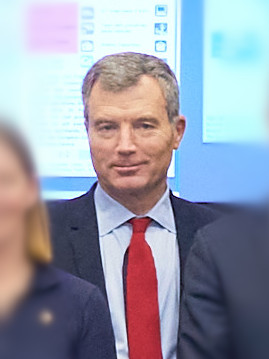
- Mirmand in 2022

26th Minister of State of Monaco
- Incumbent
- Assumed office 21 July 2025
- Monarch: Albert II
- Preceded by: Isabelle Berro-Amadeï (acting)

Personal details
- Born: Christophe Jacques-Pierre Mirmand; 22 July 1961 (age 65) Constantine, French Algeria
- Party: Independent
- Education: Paris Dauphine University; Sciences Po; École nationale d'administration
- Occupation: Civil servant

Christophe Jacques-Pierre Mirmand (French pronunciation: [kʁistɔf miʁmɑ̃]; born 22 July 1961) is a French government official who was appointed the 26th minister of state of Monaco under Prince Albert II on 21 July 2025. He succeeded Isabelle Berro-Amadeï, who held the office in an acting capacity following the death of Didier Guillaume.

== Career ==
Mirmand was born in Constantine, Algeria. He studied at the École nationale d'administration where he graduated in 1988.

In 1990, Mirmand was the chief of staff for the prefect of Guadeloupe. In 1992, he worked as a technical advisor for the Police nationale. He was Secretary General of the Var from 1999 to 2001.

From 2004 to 2006, he was working at the general counsel of the Hauts-de-Seine where he met Nicolas Sarkozy, whom facilitated the launch of his career. Mirmand was a prefect in Haute-Loire (2006–2008), Savoie (2010–2012), Alpes-Maritimes (2012–2013), Corse-du-Sud (2013–2016), Ille-et-Vilaine (2016–2018) and Bouches-du-Rhône (2020, succeeding Pierre Dartout–2025).

In Paris, Mirmand was secretary-general of the Ministry of the Interior (2018–2020) and chief of staff to the Minister of the Overseas (2025).

In July 2025, he was appointed minister of state of Monaco by Prince Albert II, succeeding Isabelle Berro-Amadeï.

== Honours ==
- Officer of the Legion of Honour (2020)
- Officer of the Ordre national du Mérite (2015)

Political offices
Preceded by Isabelle Berro-Amadeï; Acting	Minister of State of Monaco; 2025–present	Incumbent
