= Isabelle Berro-Amadeï =

Monégasque judge (born 1965)

Her Excellency Isabelle Berro-Amadeï
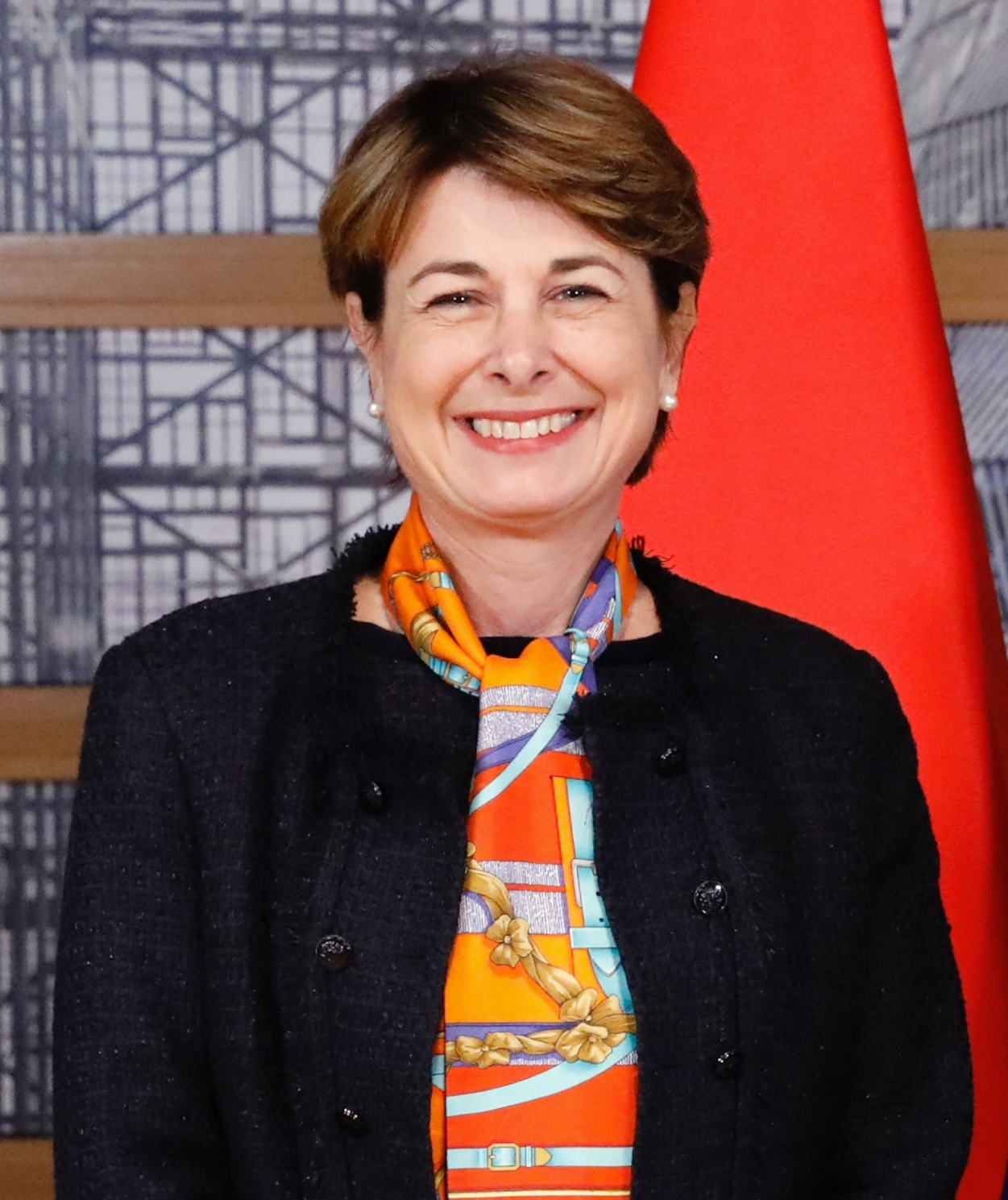
- Berro-Amadeï in 2020

Acting Minister of State of Monaco
- In office 10 January 2025 – 21 July 2025
- Monarch: Albert II
- Preceded by: Didier Guillaume
- Succeeded by: Christophe Mirmand

Minister of Foreign Affairs and Cooperation
- Incumbent
- Assumed office 17 January 2022
- Prime Minister: Pierre Dartout (until September 2024); Didier Guillaume (September 2024 - January 2025); Herself (January - July 2025); Christophe Mirmand (July 2025 - present)
- Preceded by: Laurent Anselmi

President of the Committee of Ministers of the Council of Europe
- Incumbent
- Assumed office 15 May 2026
- Preceded by: Mihai Popșoi

Judge of the European Court of Human Rights from Monaco
- In office 27 June 2006 – 1 August 2015

Personal details
- Born: 24 October 1965 (age 61) Monaco
- Children: 1
- Education: Université Nice-Sophia-Antipolis; French National School for the Judiciary

Isabelle Berro-Amadeï (born 24 October 1965) is a Monégasque judge who has served as Minister of Foreign Affairs and Cooperation of Monaco since 2022. On 10 January 2025, she was appointed acting Minister of State after Didier Guillaume was hospitalised. Following Guillaume's death a week later, she retained the position until the appointment of Christophe Mirmand on 21 July 2025.

== Biography ==
She was born on 24 October 1965 in Monaco. From 1984 to 1987, she attended the University of Nice studying law. She obtained her master's degree from the university in private law. Afterward, from 1987 to 1989, she was an Auditor of Justice at the French National School for the Judiciary and did a judicial internship at the Tribunal de Grande Instance in Carcassonne.

After returning to Monaco, Berro became a judge at the Court of First Instance of Monaco from 1990 to 2000 and was then first judge at the same court from 2000 to 2006. She then became a judge at the European Court of Human Rights in respect of Monaco from 2006 to 2015. She was appointed Ambassador of Monaco to Germany, Austria and Poland in 2016. From 2019 to 2022, she was then Ambassador to Belgium, Luxembourg, and the Netherlands, and was also Head of Monaco's Mission to the European Union.

In 2022, she became Minister of Foreign Affairs and Cooperation, while at the same time keeping her responsibilities with the mission to the European Union. During her time as Minister of Foreign Affairs, she has strongly condemned the Russian invasion of Ukraine, although she rejected any use of force to maintain Monaco's politically and militarily neutral state. She has also emphasized maintaining stability in the Mediterranean region.

The Prince of Monaco, Albert II, appointed Berro-Amadeï to be the acting Minister of State after the hospitalization of Didier Guillaume, the Minister of State since 2 September 2024, on 10 January 2025. Guillaume died on 17 January 2025. Since then, Berro-Amadeï has served as both the Minister of Foreign Affairs and Cooperation and the Minister of State. She is the first woman and second of Monégasque nationality to be Minister of State.

== Personal life ==
She is married and has one child.

Political offices
Preceded by Didier Guillaume	Prime Minister of Monaco; Acting; 2025	Succeeded by Christophe Mirmand
