= 2015 Monegasque communal elections =

All 15 places were won by List for the Communal Evolution

The 2015 Monegasque communal elections were held on 15 March to elect the 15 members of the Communal Council of Monaco.

== Electoral system ==
Monegasque citizens over 18 are entitled to vote. The 15 councillors were elected for a four-year period in a single multi-member constituency using plurality-at-large voting with a two-round system. A majority of the votes was required to be elected. The second round would have been held one week after the first round. The Mayor of Monaco was elected by the councillors after the election. Candidates were required to be at least 21 years old and to have the Monegasque nationality for at least 5 years.

== Results ==
=== Summary ===
← 2015 Communal Council of Monaco election results →
Party	Votes	%	Seats
List for the Communal Evolution	43,823	73.9	15
A New Look	15,439	26.1	0
Total	59,262	100	15
Valid ballots	4,149	95.9	
Blank ballots	58	1.3	
Invalid ballots	119	2.8	
Total	4,326	100	
Registered voters/turnout	7,042	60.6	
Source: Journal de Monaco, 20/03/2015, p.688

Georges Marsan was reelected mayor after the election.

=== Full results ===
Party	Candidates	Votes	Total party votes	%	Seats
Communal Evolution	Chloé Boscagli-Leclercq	3,012	43,823	73.9	15
Communal Evolution	Jacques Pastor	3,010	43,823	73.9	15
Communal Evolution	Marjorie Crovetto-Harroch	3,008	43,823	73.9	15
Communal Evolution	Axelle Amalberti-Verdino	2,978	43,823	73.9	15
Communal Evolution	Camille Svara	2,962	43,823	73.9	15
Communal Evolution	Charles Maricic	2,960	43,823	73.9	15
Communal Evolution	André J. Campana	2,937	43,823	73.9	15
Communal Evolution	Nicolas Croesi	2,932	43,823	73.9	15
Communal Evolution	Karyn Ardisson-Salopek	2,913	43,823	73.9	15
Communal Evolution	François Lallemand	2,911	43,823	73.9	15
Communal Evolution	Claude Bollati	2,906	43,823	73.9	15
Communal Evolution	Jean-Marc Deoriti-Castellini	2,865	43,823	73.9	15
Communal Evolution	Henri Doria	2,828	43,823	73.9	15
Communal Evolution	Françoise Gamerdinger	2,828	43,823	73.9	15
Communal Evolution	Georges Marsan	2,773	43,823	73.9	15
A New Look	Franck Nicolas	1,191	15,439	26.1	0
A New Look	Georges Faivre	1,131	15,439	26.1	0
A New Look	Criss Roux	1,111	15,439	26.1	0
A New Look	Patrice Woolley	1,070	15,439	26.1	0
A New Look	Roland Mouflard	1,035	15,439	26.1	0
A New Look	Jean-Michel Rapaire	1,032	15,439	26.1	0
A New Look	Raymond Lettieri	1,016	15,439	26.1	0
A New Look	Gilbert Bessi	1,009	15,439	26.1	0
A New Look	Jean-José Bertani	1,005	15,439	26.1	0
A New Look	Yvette Gazza-Cellario	990	15,439	26.1	0
A New Look	Sylvie Carlon	986	15,439	26.1	0
A New Look	Sandra Antognelli	980	15,439	26.1	0
A New Look	Audrey Le Joliff-Bovini	969	15,439	26.1	0
A New Look	Philippe Garelli	963	15,439	26.1	0
A New Look	Pauline de Zeeuw-Willard	951	15,439	26.1	0
Source: Journal de Monaco, 20/03/2015, p.688
