= Campora (disambiguation) =

Campora is a town and comune in the province of Salerno, Italy.

Campora may also refer to:

- Campora San Giovanni, province of Cosenza, Italy
- La Cámpora, Argentine youth wing of the "Front for Victory" party

== People with the surname ==
- Anne-Marie Campora (1938-2015), Monegasque politician
- Charles Campora, Monegasque businessman
- Jean-Louis Campora (born 1938), Monegasque physician, politician and businessman
- Giuseppe Campora (1923–2004), Italian operatic tenor
- Héctor José Cámpora (1909–1980), President of Argentina
- Monina Cámpora (1914–1998), Dominican Republic pianist and educator
