= 1995 Monegasque communal elections =

The 1995 Monegasque communal elections were held on 19 February to elect the 15 members of the Communal Council of Monaco.

== Electoral system ==
Monegasque citizens over 18 were entitled to vote. The 15 councillors were elected for a four-year period in a single multi-member constituency using plurality-at-large voting with a two-round system. A majority of the votes was required to be elected. The second round would have been held one week after the first round. The Mayor of Monaco was elected by the councillors after the election. Candidates were required to be at least 21 years old and to have the Monegasque nationality for at least 5 years.

== Results ==
← 1995 Communal Council of Monaco election results →
Party	Votes	%	Seats
List for the Communal Evolution	32,472	72.4	15
Together for our city	12,384	27.6	0
Total	44,856	100	15
Valid ballots	3,151	96.1	
Blank ballots	23	0.7	
Invalid ballots	104	3.2	
Total	3,278	100	
Registered voters/turnout	4,718	69.5	
Source: Journal de Monaco, 24/02/1995, p.203

Following the election, Anne-Marie Campora was reelected mayor.
