= 1999 Monegasque communal elections =

The 1999 Monegasque communal elections were held on 21 February to elect the 15 members of the Communal Council of Monaco.

== Electoral system ==
Monegasque citizens over 18 were entitled to vote. The 15 councillors were elected for a four-year period in a single multi-member constituency using plurality-at-large voting with a two-round system. A majority of the votes was required to be elected. The second round would have been held one week after the first round. The Mayor of Monaco was elected by the councillors after the election. Candidates were required to be at least 21 years old and to have the Monegasque nationality for at least 5 years.

== Results ==
← 1999 Communal Council of Monaco election results →
Party	Votes	%	Seats
List for the Communal Evolution	31,274	100	15
Total	31,274	100	15
Valid ballots	2,553	87.5	
Blank ballots	244	8.4	
Invalid ballots	122	4.2	
Total	2,919	100	
Registered voters/turnout	4,929	59.2	
Source: Journal de Monaco, 26/02/1999, p.399

Following the election, Anne-Marie Campora was reelected mayor.
