= 1991 Monegasque communal elections =

The 1991 Monegasque communal elections were held on 10 and 17 February to elect the 15 members of the Communal Council of Monaco.

== Electoral system ==
Monegasque citizens over 18 were entitled to vote. The 15 councillors were elected for a four-year period in a single multi-member constituency using plurality-at-large voting with a two-round system. A majority of the votes was required to be elected. The second round was held one week after the first round. The Mayor of Monaco was elected by the councillors after the election. Candidates were required to be at least 21 years old and to have the Monegasque nationality for at least 5 years.

== Results ==
← 1991 Communal Council of Monaco election results →
Party	First round			Second round			Total seats
Party	Votes	%	Seats	Votes	%	Seats	Total seats
List for the Communal Evolution	18,103	45.0	0	11,396	56.1	8	8
Municipal Action List	21,849	54.3	7	8,805	43.3	0	7
Independents	262	0.7	0	120	0.6	0	0
Total	40,214	100	7	20,321	100	8	15
Valid ballots	2,974	96.2		2,748	97.0		
Blank ballots	14	0.5		86	3.0		
Invalid ballots	103	3.3		86	3.0		
Total	3,091	100		2,834	100		
Registered voters/turnout	4,381	70.6		4,384	64.6		
Sources: Journal de Monaco, 15/02/1991, p. 175; Journal de Monaco, 22/07/1991, p. 202

Following the election, Anne-Marie Campora was elected mayor.
