= 2011 Monegasque communal elections =

The 2011 Monegasque communal elections were held on 13 March to elect the 15 members of the Communal Council of Monaco.

== Electoral system ==
Monegasque citizens over 18 are entitled to vote. The 15 councillors were elected for a four-year period in a single multi-member constituency using plurality-at-large voting with a two-round system. A majority of the votes were required to be elected. The second round would have been held one week after the first round. The Mayor of Monaco was elected by the councillors after the election. Candidates were required to be at least 21 years old and to have the Monegasque nationality for at least 5 years.

== Results ==
← 2011 Communal Council of Monaco election results →
Party	Votes	%	Seats
List for the Communal Evolution	38,077	86.1	15
List for the Renewal of the Council	6,133	13.9	0
Total	44,210	100	15
Valid ballots	3,440	94.5	
Blank ballots	80	2.2	
Invalid ballots	119	3.3	
Total	3,639	100	
Registered voters/turnout	6,509	55.9	
Source: Journal de Monaco, 18/03/2011, p.486

Georges Marsan was reelected as a mayor after the election.
