= 2007 Monegasque communal elections =

Election to the Communal Council of Monaco

The 2007 Monegasque communal elections were held on 4 March to elect the 15 members of the Communal Council of Monaco.

== Electoral system ==
Monegasque citizens over 18 are entitled to vote. The 15 councillors were elected for a four-year period in a single multi-member constituency using plurality-at-large voting with a two-round system. A majority of the votes was required to be elected. The second round would have been held one week after the first round. The Mayor of Monaco was elected by the councillors after the election. Candidates were required to be at least 21 years old and to have the Monegasque nationality for at least 5 years.

== Results ==
← 2007 Communal Council of Monaco election results →
Party	Votes	%	Seats
List for the Communal Evolution	38,726	99.1	15
Independents	367	0.9	0
Total	39,930	100	15
Valid ballots	3,110	91.5	
Blank ballots	64	1.9	
Invalid ballots	224	6.6	
Total	3,398	100	
Registered voters/turnout	6,211	54.7	
Source: Journal de Monaco, 09/03/2007, p.486

Georges Marsan was re-elected mayor.
