= 1983 Monegasque communal elections =

The 1983 Monegasque communal elections were held on 8 February to elect the 15 members of the Communal Council of Monaco.

== Electoral system ==
The 15 councillors were elected for a four-year period in a single multi-member constituency using plurality-at-large voting with a two-round system. A majority of the votes was required to be elected. The second round would have been held one week after the first round. The Mayor of Monaco was elected by the councillors after the election. Candidates were required to be at least 21 years old and to have the Monegasque nationality for at least 5 years.

== Results ==
← 1983 Communal Council of Monaco election results →
Party	Votes	%	Seats
Municipal Action List	31,318	100	15
Total	31,318	100	15
Valid ballots	2,451	93.4	
Blank ballots	128	4.9	
Invalid ballots	44	1.7	
Total	2,623	100	
Registered voters/turnout	3,909	67.1	
Source: Journal de Monaco, 11/02/1983, p.116

Following the election, Jean-Louis Médecin was reelected mayor.
