= 1979 Monegasque communal elections =

The 1979 Monegasque communal elections were held on 11 February to elect the 15 members of the Communal Council of Monaco.

== Electoral system ==
The 15 councillors were elected for a four-year period in a single multi-member constituency using plurality-at-large voting with a two-round system. A majority of the votes was required to be elected. The second round would have been held one week after the first round. The Mayor of Monaco was elected by the councillors after the election. Candidates were required to be at least 21 years old and to have the Monegasque nationality for at least 5 years.

== Results ==
← 1979 Communal Council of Monaco election results →
Party	First round			Second round			Total seats
Party	Votes	%	Seats	Votes	%	Seats	Total seats
Municipal Action List	21,922	62.8	14	1,345	N/A	1	15
Join List for a Monegasque Renewal	13,011	37.2	0	N/A	N/A	0	0
Total	34,933	100	14	1,345	100	1	15
Valid ballots	2,600	93.4		1,546	84.1		
Blank ballots	85	3.1		201	10.9		
Invalid ballots	99	3.6		92	5.0		
Total	2,784	100		1,839	100		
Registered voters/turnout	3,690	75.4		3,689	49.9		
Sources: Journal de Monaco, 09/02/1979, p.132 Journal de Monaco, 16/02/1979, p.155 Journal de Monaco, 23/02/1979, p.169

Following the election, Jean-Louis Médecin was reelected mayor.
