= 1975 Monegasque communal elections =

The 1975 Monegasque communal elections were held on 16 February to elect the 15 members of the Communal Council of Monaco.

== Electoral system ==
The 15 councillors were elected for a four-year period in a single multi-member constituency using plurality-at-large voting with a two-round system. A majority of the votes was required to be elected. The second round would have been held one week after the first round. The Mayor of Monaco was elected by the councillors after the election. Candidates were required to be at least 21 years old and to have the Monegasque nationality for at least 5 years.

== Results ==
← 1975 Communal Council of Monaco election results →
Party	Votes	%	Seats
Municipal Action List	24,454	97.6	15
Independents	600	2.4	0
Total	25,54	100	15
Valid ballots	2,284	92.6	
Blank ballots	81	3.3	
Invalid ballots	101	4.1	
Total	2,466	100	
Registered voters/turnout	3,482	70.8	
Source: Journal de Monaco, 21/02/1975, p.167

Following the election, Jean-Louis Médecin was reelected mayor.
