= 1963 Monegasque communal elections =

Council elections in Monaco

The 1963 Monegasque communal elections were held on 10 March to elect the 15 members of the Communal Council of Monaco.

== Electoral system ==
The 15 councillors were elected for a four-year period in a single multi-member constituency using plurality-at-large voting with a two-round system. A majority of the votes was required to be elected. The second round would have been held one week after the first round. The Mayor of Monaco was elected by the councillors after the election.

== Results ==
=== Summary ===
← 1963 Communal Council of Monaco election results →
Party	Votes	%	Seats
Robert Boisson list	19,738	100	15
Total	19,738	100	15
Valid ballots	1,892	97.1	
Blank/invalid ballots	57	2.9	
Total	1,949	100	
Registered voters/turnout	3,99	62.9	
Source: Journal de Monaco, 15/03/1963, p.138

Following the election, Robert Boisson was reelected mayor.

=== Full results ===
Party	Candidates	Votes	Total party votes	%	Seats
Robert Boisson list	José Notari	1,487	27,843	100	15
Robert Boisson list	Marius Gastaud	1,474	27,843	100	15
Robert Boisson list	Roxane Noat-Notari	2,042	27,843	100	15
Robert Boisson list	Jean-Joseph Marquet	1,989	27,843	100	15
Robert Boisson list	Emile Gaziello	1,979	27,843	100	15
Robert Boisson list	Jean-Louis Medecin	1,957	27,843	100	15
Robert Boisson list	Robert Boisson	1,945	27,843	100	15
Robert Boisson list	Laurent Savelli	1,938	27,843	100	15
Robert Boisson list	Paul Choinière	1,936	27,843	100	15
Robert Boisson list	Charles-Maurice Crovetto	1,891	27,843	100	15
Robert Boisson list	Laurent Fontana	1,890	27,843	100	15
Robert Boisson list	Germaine Sangiorgio	1,872	27,843	100	15
Robert Boisson list	Louis Sangiorgio	1,862	27,843	100	15
Robert Boisson list	Roger Bauscher	1,802	27,843	100	15
Robert Boisson list	Raymond Franzi	1,779	27,843	100	15
Source: Journal de Monaco, 15/03/1963, p.138
