= 1967 Monegasque communal elections =

The 1967 Monegasque communal elections were held on 25 February and 3 March to elect the 15 members of the Communal Council of Monaco.

== Electoral system ==
The 15 councillors were elected for a four-year period in a single multi-member constituency using plurality-at-large voting with a two-round system. A majority of the votes was required to be elected. The second round would have been held one week after the first round.

The Mayor of Monaco was elected by the councillors after the election.

== Results ==
=== Summary ===
← 1967 Communal Council of Monaco election results →
| Party | First round | | | Second round | | | Total seats |
| Party | Votes | % | Seats | Votes | % | Seats | Total seats |
|---|---|---|---|---|---|---|---|
| Robert Boisson list | 18,335 | 72.5 | 10 | 5,547 | 66.0 | 4 | 14 |
| Left-wing list | 4,987 | 19.7 | 0 | 2,861 | 34.0 | 0 | 0 |
| Independents | 1,953 | 7.7 | 1 | 0 | 0.0 | 0 | 1 |
| Total | 25,275 | 100 | 7 | 8,101 | 100 | 8 | 15 |
| Valid ballots | 2,274 | 96.1 | | 2,177 | 97.8 | | |
| Blank/invalid ballots | 93 | 3.9 | | 48 | 2.2 | | |
| Total | 2,367 | 100 | | 2,225 | 100 | | |
| Registered voters/turnout | 3,296 | 71.8 | | 3,296 | 67.5 | | |
Sources: Journal de Monaco, 24/02/1967, p.157 Journal de Monaco, 03/03/1967, p.173 Journal de Monaco, 10/03/1967, p.191

Following the election, Robert Boisson was reelected mayor.

=== Full results ===
==== First round ====
| Party | Candidates | Votes | Total party votes | % | Seats |
|---|---|---|---|---|---|
| Robert Boisson list | Joseph Notari | 1,445 | 18,335 | 72.5 | 10 |
| Robert Boisson list | Charles Lorenzi | 1,406 | 18,335 | 72.5 | 10 |
| Robert Boisson list | Edmond Aubert | 1,362 | 18,335 | 72.5 | 10 |
| Robert Boisson list | Jean-Louis Medecin | 1,334 | 18,335 | 72.5 | 10 |
| Robert Boisson list | Pierre Crovetto | 1,303 | 18,335 | 72.5 | 10 |
| Robert Boisson list | Jean-Joseph Marquet | 1,264 | 18,335 | 72.5 | 10 |
| Robert Boisson list | Ramon Badia | 1,255 | 18,335 | 72.5 | 10 |
| Robert Boisson list | Raymond Franzi | 1,214 | 18,335 | 72.5 | 10 |
| Robert Boisson list | Germaine Sangiorgio | 1,179 | 18,335 | 72.5 | 10 |
| Robert Boisson list | Laurent Savelli | 1,175 | 18,335 | 72.5 | 10 |
| Robert Boisson list | Robert Boisson | 1,123 | 18,335 | 72.5 | 10 |
| Robert Boisson list | Alain Vatrican | 1,103 | 18,335 | 72.5 | 10 |
| Robert Boisson list | Joseph Iori | 1,094 | 18,335 | 72.5 | 10 |
| Robert Boisson list | René Croesi | 1,065 | 18,335 | 72.5 | 10 |
| Robert Boisson list | Laurent Fontana | 1,013 | 18,335 | 72.5 | 10 |
| Left-wing list | Charles Soccal | 1,041 | 4,987 | 19.7 | 0 |
| Left-wing list | Jean Sbarrato | 687 | 4,987 | 19.7 | 0 |
| Left-wing list | Patrice Lorenzi | 627 | 4,987 | 19.7 | 0 |
| Left-wing list | Joseph Deri | 506 | 4,987 | 19.7 | 0 |
| Left-wing list | Claude Rosticher | 450 | 4,987 | 19.7 | 0 |
| Left-wing list | Marie-Rose Bennati | 446 | 4,987 | 19.7 | 0 |
| Left-wing list | Raymond Crema | 443 | 4,987 | 19.7 | 0 |
| Left-wing list | Bernard Jacques | 395 | 4,987 | 19.7 | 0 |
| Left-wing list | Yvette Brugnetti | 392 | 4,987 | 19.7 | 0 |
| Independent | Emile Gaziello | 1,147 | 1,953 | 7.7 | 1 |
| Independent | Marius Gastaud | 806 | 1,953 | 7.7 | 1 |
Sources: Journal de Monaco, 24/02/1967, p.157 Journal de Monaco, 03/03/1967, p.173

==== Second round ====
| Party | Candidates | Votes | Total party votes | % | Seats |
|---|---|---|---|---|---|
| Robert Boisson list | René Croesi | 1,445 | 5,547 | 66.0 | 4 |
| Robert Boisson list | Robert Boisson | 1,406 | 5,547 | 66.0 | 4 |
| Robert Boisson list | Joseph Iori | 1,362 | 5,547 | 66.0 | 4 |
| Robert Boisson list | Alain Vatrican | 1,334 | 5,547 | 66.0 | 4 |
| Left-wing list | Charles Soccal | 1,041 | 2,861 | 34.0 | 0 |
| Left-wing list | Jean Sbarrato | 687 | 2,861 | 34.0 | 0 |
| Left-wing list | Patrice Lorenzi | 627 | 2,861 | 34.0 | 0 |
| Left-wing list | Joseph Deri | 506 | 2,861 | 34.0 | 0 |
Sources: Journal de Monaco, 24/02/1967, p.157 Journal de Monaco, 10/03/1967, p.191
