= Visa requirements for Russian citizens =

Administrative entry restrictions

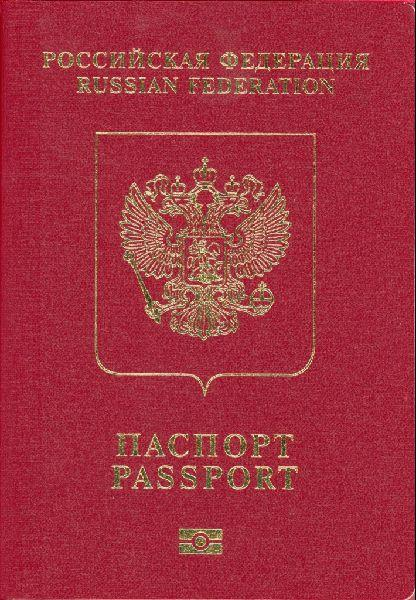
A Russian passport for international travel

Visa requirements for Russian citizens are administrative entry restrictions by the authorities of other states placed on citizens of Russia.

Russian citizens in other countries also can benefit from the mobility rights arrangements within the Commonwealth of Independent States and the rules of the single market of the Eurasian Economic Union.

As of 2026, Russian citizens have visa-free or visa on arrival access to 112 countries and territories, ranking the Russian passport 44th in the world according to the Henley Passport Index.

The Russian passport along with the Turkish passport are the highest ranking passports whose holders are still required visas for their travels to the European Union, the United States, the United Kingdom, and Canada.

== History ==
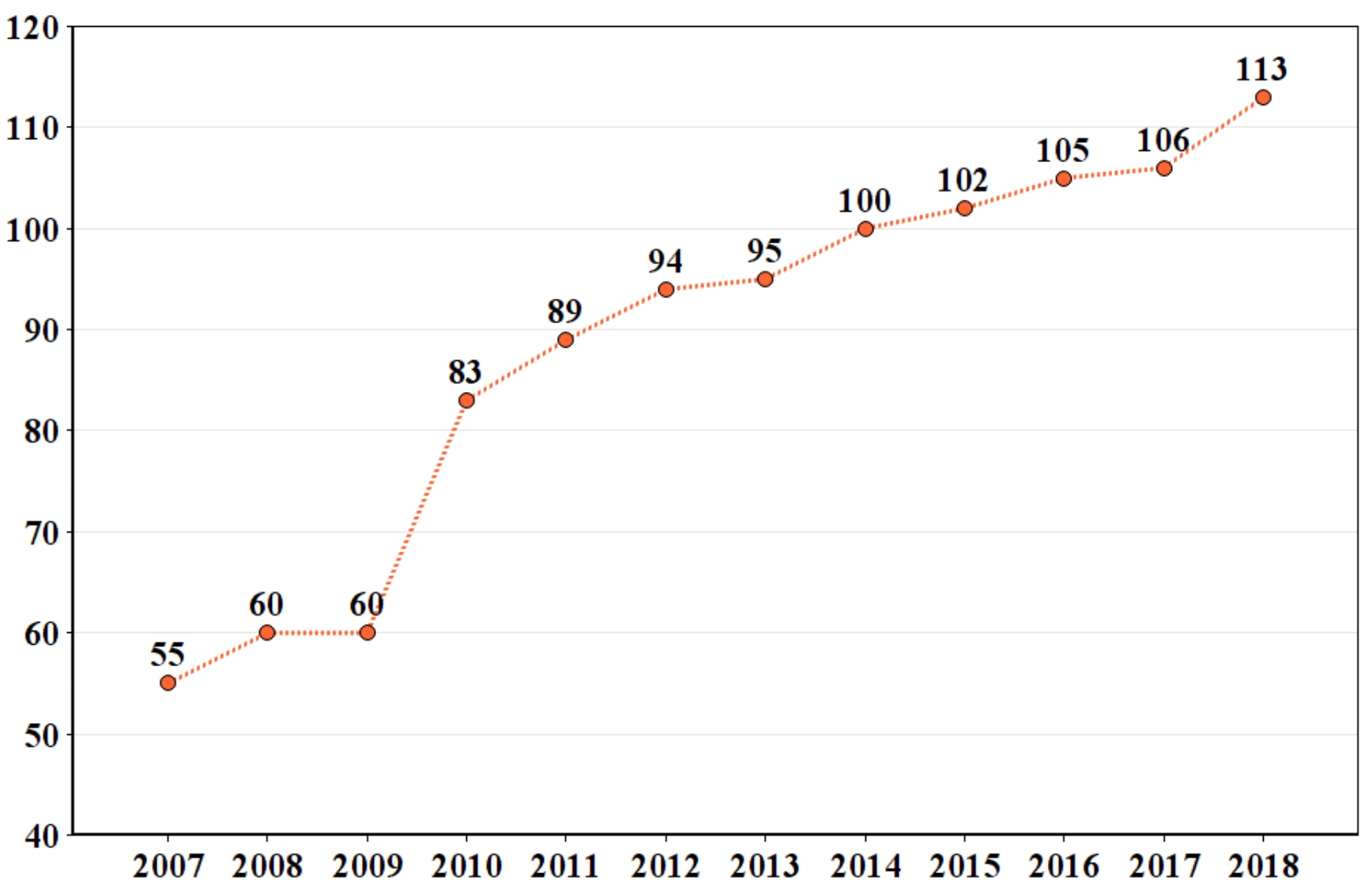
Henley & Partners Passport Index. 2007 – Q1 2018. Russia.

| Country | Date |
|---|---|
| Micronesia | 18 December 1980, As Soviet Union |
| Dominica | 11 March 1993 |
| Cuba | 29 July 1994 |
| Antigua and Barbuda | 6 November 1996 |
| Malaysia | 1998 |
| Namibia | August 2001 |
| Morocco | 13 June 2005 |
| Botswana | 5 December 2006 |
| Thailand | 24 March 2007 |
| Swaziland | 12 June 2007 |
| Laos | 1 September 2007 |
| Philippines | 19 September 2007 |
| Ecuador | 20 June 2008 |
| Israel | 20 September 2008 |
| Vietnam | 1 January 2009 |
| Nicaragua | 19 March 2009 |
| Venezuela | 6 March 2009 |
| El Salvador; Honduras | 31 March 2009 |
| Bahamas | 1 April 2009 |
| Guatemala | 1 April 2009 |
| Colombia | 20 April 2009 |
| Argentina | 29 June 2009 |
| Hong Kong | 1 July 2009 |
| Brazil | 7 June 2010 |
| Guyana | 1 August 2010 |
| Trinidad and Tobago | December 2010 |
| Chile | 18 January 2011 |
| Turkey | April 2011 |
| Saint Lucia | 27 September 2011 |
| Uruguay | 27 December 2011 |
| Georgia (country) | until December 2000, visa-free for residents of Caucasian Regions from October 2010, resumed for all citizens on 29 February 2012 |
| Macau | 30 September 2012 |
| Mauritius | November 2012 |
| Jamaica | 11 March 2013 |
| Saint Kitts and Nevis | 28 May 2013 |
| South Korea | 1 January 2014 |
| Costa Rica | until 1 February 2008, resumed from 12 April 2014 |
| Panama | 14 April 2014 |
| Paraguay | 20 October 2014 |
| Mongolia | resumed from 14 November 2014 |
| Tunisia | 1 December 2014 |
| Turks and Caicos | 2006 – September 2011, resumed in April 2015 |
| Nauru | 14 May 2015 |
| Indonesia | 10 June 2015 |
| Bolivia | 3 October 2016 |
| Senegal | resumed in December 2016 |
| South Africa | 30 March 2017 |
| São Tomé and Príncipe | 25 April 2017 |
| Qatar | 22 June 2017 |
| Brunei | 8 January 2018 |
| Taiwan | 6 September 2018 |
| Palau | 27 December 2018 |
| United Arab Emirates | 17 February 2019 |
| Suriname | 13 May 2019 |
| Maldives | 25 July 2019 |
| Cabo Verde | 4 July 2020 |
| Oman | December 2020 |
| Belize | 12 January 2022 |
| Myanmar | 1 July 2022 |
| Mozambique | 14 March 2023 |
| Kiribati | 1 September 2023 |
| Angola | 29 September 2023 |
| Jordan | 18 August 2025 |
| China | 15 September 2025 |
| Saudi Arabia | 11 May 2026 |

Visa requirements for Russian citizens were lifted as the Soviet Union by the following countries/territories: Micronesia (18 December 1980);. Mexico has introduced Electronic Authorization for Russian citizens from 1 November 2010.

Visas on arrival were introduced by Iran (July 2005), Zimbabwe (20 November 2007), Bahrain (November 2008), Guinea-Bissau (April 2012), Mozambique (resumed in February 2017), Gabon (12 October 2017), Rwanda (1 January 2018), Benin (15 March 2018), Taiwan (6 September 2018), Sierra Leone (5 September 2019), Saudi Arabia (28 September 2019), Myanmar (1 October 2019), Iraq (15 March 2021).

Russian citizens were made eligible for eVisas by Singapore (December 2009), Sri Lanka (January 2012), Montserrat (September 2012), São Tomé and Príncipe (2012), Myanmar (1 September 2014), India made Russian citizens eligible for the e-Visa (27 November 2014), Kenya (2 July 2015), Gabon (15 June 2015), Australia (Electronic Visitor visa from 1 October 2015), Uganda (1 July 2016). Lesotho (1 May 2017), Saint Helena (2018), Djibouti (18 February 2018), Oman (7 May 2018), Tanzania (26 November 2018), Papua New Guinea (17 June 2019), Saudi Arabia (28 September 2019), Guinea (October 2019), Malawi (November 2019), South Sudan (29 September 2020), Anguilla (January 2021), Equatorial Guinea (July 2023).

The following countries / territories have reinstated visa requirements for Russian citizens: Estonia (1 July 1992), Latvia (20 March 1993), Lithuania (1 November 1993), North Korea (22 May 1997), Turkmenistan (June 1999), Slovenia (December 1999),^{*} Czech Republic (29 May 2000),^{*} Slovakia (1 January 2001),^{*} Hungary (14 June 2001),^{*} Bulgaria (October 2001),^{*} Poland (1 October 2003),^{*} Cyprus (1 January 2004),^{*} Romania (October 2004),^{*} Croatia (1 April 2013),^{*} Kosovo (1 July 2013), Guam and the Northern Mariana Islands (3 October 2019), North Macedonia (21 March 2022), Ukraine (1 July 2022) and Taiwan (31 July 2022).

* Visa policy has been synchronized with the visa policy of the EU because of accession of these countries to the European Union.

The provision of visas on arrival to Russian citizens were discontinued by Mali (9 March 2015).

== Visa requirements map ==
Visa requirements for Russian citizens holding ordinary passports Russian Federation Freedom of movement Visa not required, internal passport valid Visa not required / ETA (Note: Electronic Travel Authorization required for Cape Verde, Israel, Kenya, Mozambique, Saint Kitts and Nevis, Seychelles, South Korea, Sri Lanka) Visa available both on arrival or online Visa on arrival Visa-free for group tourists eVisa eVisa (conditional) / Online visa (Note: Visitor visas for Australia, New Zealand, and Singapore can be obtained fully online; Afghanistan imposes residency conditions for its eVisa) Visa required Admission generally refused

== Visa requirements ==
Visa requirements for holders of ordinary passports traveling for tourist purposes:

| Country / Region | Visa requirement | Allowed stay | Notes (excluding departure fees) | Reciprocity |
|---|---|---|---|---|
| Afghanistan | Visa required / eVisa (conditional) | 30 days | e-Visa : Visitors must arrive at Kabul International (KBL).; Citizens of Russia residing in other countries might be eligible for an e-Visa; Due to safety concerns, the Russian government advises its citizens not to visit Afghanistan. | X |
| Albania | eVisa | 90 days | Visa-free entry for up to 90 days for valid USA, United Kingdom or Schengen Member State ('C' or 'D' visa) visa holders. | X |
| Algeria | Visa required | | Persons may be denied entry if entering with a passport containing visas or stamps issued by Israel.; Visitors on tours organized to some southern regions by an approved travel agency may obtain a visa on arrival for up to 30 days. | ✓ |
| Andorra | Visa not required | 90 days | 90 days within any 365-day period.; Although officially no visa is required, at least a Double Entry Schengen visa is required to enter Andorra since it has no own airport facility. | ✓ |
| Angola | Visa not required | 30 days | 30 days per trip, but no more than 90 days within any 1 calendar year for tourism purposes only.; Visitors must have a return/onward ticket and a hotel reservation confirmation.; An International Certificate of Vaccination is required. | X |
| Antigua and Barbuda | Visa not required | 6 months | | ✓ |
| Argentina | Visa not required | 3 months | 90 days within any 180-day period. | ✓ |
| Armenia | Visa not required | 180 days | 180 days in a year.; Internal ID valid. | ✓ |
| Australia and territories | Online Visa required | | May apply online (Online Visitor e600 visa). | ✓ |
| Austria | Visa required | | | ✓ |
| Azerbaijan | Visa not required | 90 days | 90 days within one calendar year period.; Entry denied to those of Armenian descent. | ✓ |
| Bahamas | Visa not required | 3 months | Extension of stay is possible. | X |
| Bahrain | eVisa / Visa on arrival | 14 days / 1 month | Visas can be issued on arrival for a stay up to 1 month.; Visa can be extended for an additional two weeks.; e-Visa issued for 14 days, extendable once. | X |
| Bangladesh | Visa on arrival | 30 days | Visitors can apply to extend their stay when in the country. | X |
| Barbados | Visa not required | 28 days | | X |
| Belarus | Freedom of movement | Unlimited stay | Russian citizens have many of the same rights and entitlements as Belarusian citizens.; Internal ID valid. | ✓ |
| Belgium | Visa required | | | ✓ |
| Belize | Visa not required | 90 days | 90 days within a 180-day period. | ✓ |
| Benin | eVisa | 30 days | Must have an international vaccination certificate.; Three types of electronic visa are offered: the e-Visa valid for 30 days for a single entry (50 EUR), the e-Visa valid for 30 days for several (multiple) entries (75 EUR), and the e-Visa valid for 90 days to make several (multiple) entries (100 EUR). | X |
| Bhutan | eVisa | 90 days | Visitors are required to book with a registered tour operator in Bhutan.; The Sustainable Development Fee (SDF) of 200 USD per person, per night for almost all visitors to Bhutan. Additionally, if payment is made in US dollars from September 1, 2023 to August 31, 2027, the SDF is 100 USD. | ✓ |
| Bolivia | Visa not required | 90 days | 90 days within any 180-day period. | ✓ |
| Bosnia and Herzegovina | Visa not required | 30 days | 30 days within any 60-day period. | ✓ |
| Botswana | Visa not required | 90 days | Extension to the visa-free period must be applied for in advance. | ✓ |
| Brazil | Visa not required | 90 days | Extension of stay possible for additional 90 days. | ✓ |
| Brunei | Visa not required | 14 days | | ✓ |
| Bulgaria | Visa required | | | ✓ |
| Burkina Faso | eVisa | | | X |
| Burundi | Online Visa / Visa on arrival | 1 month | Passengers holding an entry authorisation letter from the authorities may obtain a visa on arrival for a maximum stay of 1 month. | X |
| Cambodia | eVisa / Visa on arrival | 30 days | | X |
| Cape Verde | Visa not required | 60 days | Must register online at least five days prior to arrival.; Visitors must pay the Airport Security Fee (TSA) before visiting. The cost is 3,400 CVE (approx. 31 EUR) and can be paid via the online platform (EASE). | ✓ |
| Cameroon | eVisa | | May apply online.; Pre-arranged visa can be picked up on arrival. | X |
| Canada | Visa required | | US permanent resident card (Green card) holders can enter visa-free. | ✓ |
| Central African Republic | Visa required | | Multiple entry visa valid for 1 year upon arrival into the Central African Republic is mandatory.; eVisa website exists, however it's operating in a "Test mode" and claims that "electronic visa processing is currently not possible" | ✓ |
| Chad | eVisa | | | X |
| Chile | Visa not required | 90 days | Extension of stay is possible for additional 90 days for a fee. | ✓ |
| China | Visa not required | 30 days | From September 15, 2025 to 31 December 2027, Russian national ordinary passport holders can travel to China for business, tourism, family visits, transit and exchange and visit purposes for up to 30 days without a visa under the newly announced visa waiver program.; 240-hour (10-day) visa-free transit to a third country or region (including Hong Kong, Macau or Taiwan) using any mode of transport. Must have a confirmed onward ticket/itinerary, and enter through 1 of 64 approved ports.; During which, may freely travel within the 24 provinces permitted for visa-free transit and engage in tourism, business, and visits.; 24-hour visa-free transit to a third country or region (including Hong Kong, Macau, and Taiwan), is available at most international airports, without leaving the airport.; Travellers who need to leave the airport may obtain a temporary entry permit from immigration.; 5-day port visa (Visa on Arrival) for Shenzhen if arriving at designated ports of entry from Hong Kong by land or sea, for stays within Shenzhen.; 3-day port visa (Visa on Arrival) if arriving in Zhuhai or Xiamen at designated ports of entry, for stays within the respective city.; 15-day visa-free entry for cruise ship passengers in tour groups, if arriving at any cruise port along China's coastline, including but not limited to Tianjin; Dalian; Shanghai; Lianyungang; Wenzhou; Zhoushan; Xiamen; Qingdao; Guangzhou; Shenzhen; Beihai; Haikou; Sanya. May further travel inland to all regions of coastal provinces (and equivalents) and Beijing.; May apply for a port visa (Visa on Arrival) if travelling for an urgent, qualified reason. Prior clearance for port visa is highly recommended or may be denied boarding by airlines.; Visa not required for 15 days for travelling as part of an accredited tour group (5 ~ 50 people).; May visit Suifenhe without a visa for up to 15 days if travelling with at least one companion.; Residents of Amur Oblast may visit Heihe without a visa for a day.; 30 days visa-free on Hainan Island through travel agencies provided that nationals of Russia arriving on a direct flight from third countries. | ✓ |
| Colombia | Visa not required | 90 days | Extendable up to 180-day stay within 1-year period. | ✓ |
| Comoros | Visa on arrival | 45 days | | X |
| Republic of the Congo | Visa required | | | ✓ |
| Democratic Republic of the Congo | eVisa | 7 days | | X |
| Costa Rica | Visa not required | 90 days | | ✓ |
| Côte d'Ivoire | eVisa | 3 months | e-Visa holders must arrive via Port Bouet Airport. | X |
| Croatia | Visa required | | | ✓ |
| Cuba | Visa not required | 90 days | 90 days within any 180-day period. | ✓ |
| Cyprus | Visa required | | 90 days within any 180-day period for valid Schengen Member State visa holders. | ✓ |
| Czech Republic | Admission refused | | From 19 September 2022, Russian citizens are banned from entering Czech Republic for tourism, business, sports or culture | ✓ |
| Denmark | Visa required | | | ✓ |
| Djibouti | eVisa | 90 days | | X |
| Dominica | Visa not required | 90 days | | ✓ |
| Dominican Republic | Visa not required | 60 days | May extended stay for a fee. | ✓ |
| Ecuador | Visa not required | 90 days | Extension of stay is possible. | ✓ |
| Egypt | eVisa / Visa on arrival | 30 days | e-Visa issued for 30 days.; Extension of stay is possible.; Visa-free for tourists arriving at Sharm El Sheikh, Saint Catherine or Taba airports and remaining in the Sinai resorts for a maximum stay of 15 days. | X |
| El Salvador | Visa not required | 180 days | | ✓ |
| Equatorial Guinea | eVisa | | e-Visa holders must arrive via Malabo International Airport. | X |
| Eritrea | Visa required | | Pre-arranged visa can be picked up on arrival. | ✓ |
| Estonia | Admission refused | | From 19 September 2022, Russian citizens are banned from entering Estonia for tourism, business, sports or culture. | ✓ |
| Eswatini | Visa not required | 30 days | Extension of stay is possible for additional 30 days in total. | X |
| Ethiopia | eVisa / Visa on arrival | 90 days | Visa on arrival is obtainable only at Addis Ababa Bole International Airport.; e-Visa holders must arrive via Addis Ababa Bole International Airport.; e-Visa is available for 30 or 90 days. | X |
| Fiji | Visa not required | 4 months | | ✓ |
| Finland | Admission refused | | From 30 September 2022, Russian citizens are banned from entering Finland for tourism. | ✓ |
| France | Visa required | | | ✓ |
| Gabon | eVisa | 90 days | e-Visa holders must arrive via Libreville International Airport. | X |
| Gambia | Visa required | | Listed under "Countries With Visa Exemption Agreement" by Gambia Immigration Department.; However, visa exemption agreement signed in 2017 only covers service and diplomatic passports | ✓ |
| Georgia | Visa not required | 1 year | | ✓ |
| Germany | Visa required | | | ✓ |
| Ghana | eVisa | | Pre-arranged emergency visa can be picked up on arrival. | ✓ |
| Greece | Visa required | | | ✓ |
| Grenada | Visa not required | 3 months | | ✓ |
| Guatemala | Visa not required | 90 days | Extension of stay is possible for 90 days. | ✓ |
| Guinea | eVisa | 90 days | | X |
| Guinea-Bissau | Visa on arrival | 90 days | | X |
| Guyana | Visa not required | 90 days | | ✓ |
| Haiti | Visa not required | 3 months | | X |
| Honduras | Visa not required | 3 months | | ✓ |
| Hungary | Visa required | | | ✓ |
| Iceland | Visa required | | | ✓ |
| India | eVisa | 30 days | e-Visa holders must arrive via 32 designated airports (Note: Ahmedabad; Amritsar; Bagdogra; Bengaluru; Bhubaneswar; Chandigarh; Chennai; Coimbatore; Delhi; Gaya; Goa-Dabolim; Goa-Manohar; Guwahati; Hyderabad; Indore; Jaipur; Kannur; Kochi; Kolkata; Kozhikode; Lucknow; Madurai; Mangaluru; Mumbai; Nagpur; Port Blair; Pune; Surat; Thiruvananthapuram; Tiruchirappalli; Varanasi; Visakhapatnam) or 5 designated seaports. (Note: Chennai; Cochin; Mormugao; Mumbai; Mangalore); An Indian e-Tourist Visa may only be obtained twice within 1 calendar year.; Foreigners of Pakistani origin or who hold a Pakistani Passport are not eligible for an e-Visa. Foreigners who are not Pakistani nationals, but whose parents or grandparents (either paternal or maternal) were born in, or were permanent residents in Pakistan, are also not eligible for an e-Visa. | ✓ |
| Indonesia | e-VOA / Visa on arrival | 30 days | | X |
| Iran | Visa not required (conditional) / eVisa | 15 days / 30 days | Visa not required for 15 days for travelling as part of an accredited tour group (5 ~ 50 people).; Citizens of Russia who have already made an application, at least two days before arrival, at the Iranian Ministry of Foreign Affair's e-Visa website and present the submission notification at the airport's visa desk may obtain a visa on arrival.; Admission will be refused: to women not wearing Islamic head cover, scarf, long sleeves or stockings.; to holders of passports containing an Israeli visa/stamp in the last 12 months.; 14 day visa-free on Kish and Qeshm Islands.; Extension of stay is possible twice for 30 days for a total of up to 90 days. | ✓ |
| Iraq | eVisa | 30 days | Due to safety concerns, the Russian government advises its citizens not to visit Iraq. | X |
| Ireland | Visa required | | | ✓ |
| Israel | Electronic Travel Authorization | 90 days | | ✓ |
| Italy | Visa required | | | ✓ |
| Jamaica | Visa not required | 90 days | | ✓ |
| Japan | Visa required | | | X |
| Jordan | Visa not required | 90 days | | ✓ |
| Kazakhstan | Visa not required | 90 days | 90 days within any 180-day period.; Internal ID valid. | ✓ |
| Kenya | Electronic Travel Authorisation | 90 days | Applications can be submitted up to 90 days prior to travel and must be submitted at least 3 days in advance.; eTA fee is 32.50 USD.; Proof of reservation at the hotel where visitors plan to stay is required (if staying with friends, an invitation letter is also acceptable).; Yellow fever vaccination certificate is required if coming from endemic countries.; Can also be entered on an East Africa tourist visa issued by Rwanda or Uganda. | X |
| Kiribati | Visa not required | 90 days | 90 days within any 12-month period. | X |
| North Korea | Visa required | | | ✓ |
| South Korea | Electronic Travel Authorization | 60 days | A maximum total stay of 90 days within any 180-day period.; The validity period of a K-ETA is 3 years from the date of approval. | ✓ |
| Kuwait | Visa required | | Pre-arranged visa can be picked up on arrival. | ✓ |
| Kyrgyzstan | Visa not required | 90 days | 90 days within any 180-day period.; Internal ID valid. | ✓ |
| Laos | Visa not required | 30 days | | ✓ |
| Latvia | Admission refused | | From 19 September 2022, Russian citizens are banned from entering Latvia for tourism, business, sports or culture. | ✓ |
| Lebanon | Free visa on arrival | 1 month | 1 month extendable for 2 additional months.; Granted free of charge at Beirut International Airport or any other port of entry if there is no Israeli visa or seal, holding a telephone number, an address in Lebanon, and a non refundable return or circle trip ticket. | X |
| Lesotho | Visa required | | Obtaining a visa online via email might be possible | ✓ |
| Liberia | e-VOA | 3 months | | X |
| Libya | eVisa | | | X |
| Liechtenstein | Visa required | | | ✓ |
| Lithuania | Admission refused | | From 19 September 2022, Russian citizens are banned from entering Lithuania for tourism, business, sports or culture. | ✓ |
| Luxembourg | Visa required | | | ✓ |
| Madagascar | eVisa / Visa on arrival | 90 days | For stays of 61 to 90 days, the visa fee is 59 USD. | X |
| Malawi | eVisa | 90 days | | X |
| Malaysia | Visa not required | 1 month | | X |
| Maldives | Visa not required | 90 days | | ✓ |
| Mali | Visa required | | | ✓ |
| Malta | Visa required | | | ✓ |
| Marshall Islands | Visa on arrival | 90 days | | X |
| Mauritania | eVisa | 30 days | | X |
| Mauritius | Visa not required | 90 days | | ✓ |
| Mexico | Electronic Authorization | 180 days | Electronic permit gives the right to enter the country only by air.; 180 days for valid Canada, Japan, USA, United Kingdom or a Schengen Member State visa holders. | ✓ |
| Micronesia | Visa not required | 30 days | Extension of stay is possible up to 60 days. | X |
| Moldova | Visa not required | 90 days | 90 days within any 180-day period. | ✓ |
| Monaco | Visa required | | Open border with France. | ✓ |
| Mongolia | Visa not required | 30 days | | ✓ |
| Montenegro | Visa required | | Visa required from November 1, 2026. | ✓ |
| Morocco | Visa not required | 3 months | | X |
| Mozambique | Electronic Travel Authorization | 30 days | Visitors must register their ETA on the e-Visa platform at least 48 hours before travel and pay a processing fee of 48 USD.; Extension of stay is possible for 30 days. | X |
| Myanmar | Visa not required | 30 days | e-Visa holders must arrive via Yangon, Nay Pyi Taw or Mandalay airports or via land border crossings with Thailand — Tachileik, Myawaddy and Kawthaung or India — Rih Khaw Dar and Tamu.; e-Visa is available for both tourism (allowed stay is 28 days) or business (allowed stay is 70 days) purposes. | ✓ |
| Namibia | Visa not required | 90 days | 90 days within 180-day period. | ✓ |
| Nauru | Visa not required | 14 days | | ✓ |
| Nepal | Online Visa / Visa on arrival | 90 days | Extension of stay is possible of up to 150 days.; Business travellers can obtain a visa on arrival for a maximum stay of 5 years, subject to a fee and a license issued by the Ministry of Industry. | X |
| Netherlands | Visa required | | | ✓ |
| New Zealand | Online Visa required | | May apply online (Online Visitor Visa).; Also referred to as eVisa | ✓ |
| Nicaragua | Visa not required | 90 days | Tourist card must be obtained on arrival, subject to a fee.; Extension of stay is possible for additional 30 days for a fee. | ✓ |
| Niger | Visa required | | | ✓ |
| Nigeria | eVisa | 30 days | | X |
| North Macedonia | Visa required | | Visa-free entry for up to 15 days for valid USA, United Kingdom or Schengen Member State (multiple 'C' visa) visa holders. | ✓ |
| Norway | Admission refused except for Schengen Residents | 90 days | From 29 May 2024, Russian citizens are banned from entering Norway for tourism.; Visa-free access to the Kirkenes area for 15 days for holders of border traffic permit.; Visa-free access for Schengen Residents including tourism. | ✓ |
| Oman | Visa not required | 30 days | | ✓ |
| Pakistan | eVisa | 3 months | | X |
| Palau | Visa not required | 30 days | | ✓ |
| Panama | Visa not required | 90 days | Extension of stay is possible. | ✓ |
| Papua New Guinea | eVisa | 30 days | | ✓ |
| Paraguay | Visa not required | 90 days | | ✓ |
| Peru | Visa not required | 183 days | | ✓ |
| Philippines | Visa not required | 30 days | A visa on arrival is available for a maximum stay of 59 days.; Extension of stay is only possible for those who obtained a visa on arrival, to a maximum of 1 year. | X |
| Poland | Admission refused | | From 19 September 2022, Russian citizens are banned from entering Poland for tourism, business, sports or culture. | ✓ |
| Portugal | Visa required | | | ✓ |
| Qatar | Visa not required | 90 days | | ✓ |
| Romania | Visa required | | | ✓ |
| Rwanda | eVisa / Visa on arrival | 30 days | A visa on arrival is available for 30 days.; Can also be entered on an East Africa Tourist Visa issued by Kenya or Uganda. | X |
| Saint Kitts and Nevis | Electronic Travel Authorisation | 90 days | | ✓ |
| Saint Lucia | Visa not required | 6 weeks | | X |
| Saint Vincent and the Grenadines | Visa not required | 3 months | Can be extended stay for a fee. | ✓ |
| Samoa | Visa not required | 60 days | | ✓ |
| San Marino | Visa required | | In late 2021, visa abolishing agreement was signed; Both Timatic and Russian Ministry of Foreign Affairs however still state that visa is required; Nonetheless, San Marino carries out no border formalities and maintains an open border with Italy | X |
| São Tomé and Príncipe | Visa not required | 15 days | | X |
| Saudi Arabia | Visa not required | 90 days | Visa-free for 90 days within one calendar year period.; Visa is required to perform Hajj or Umrah during the Hajj season. | ✓ |
| Senegal | Visa on arrival | 1 month | | X |
| Serbia | Visa not required | 30 days | | ✓ |
| Seychelles | Electronic Border System | 3 months | Application can be submitted up to 30 days before travel.; Visitors must upload a reservation confirmation(s) for each visitor's location of stay in Seychelles.; Yellow fever vaccination certificate is required if coming from endemic countries.; Payment of the fee (EUR 10) by credit or debit card.; Valid for one journey only and it expires once exit the country. | ✓ |
| Sierra Leone | eVisa / Visa on arrival | 3 months / 30 days | | X |
| Singapore | Visa required / Online Visa | | May obtain online e-Service through eligible through authorized travel agencies or through local sponsors (Singapore citizen or permanent residents).; Allowed visa-free transit for 96 hours. | X |
| Slovakia | Visa required | | | ✓ |
| Slovenia | Visa required | | | ✓ |
| Solomon Islands | eVisa | | Pre-arranged visa can be picked up on arrival. | ✓ |
| Somalia | eVisa | 30 days | Due to safety concerns, the Russian government advises its citizens not to visit Somalia. | X |
| South Africa | Visa not required | 90 days | Extension of stay possible for additional 90 days. | ✓ |
| South Sudan | eVisa | 30 days | Obtainable online 30 days single entry for 100 USD, 90 days multiple entry for 200 USD and 180 days multiple entry for 350 USD.; Printed visa authorization must be presented at the time of travel. | X |
| Spain | Visa required | | From July 12, 2025, Russian citizens will need an airport transit visa to transit through Spanish airports | ✓ |
| Sri Lanka | ETA / Visa on arrival | 30 days | Electronic Travel Authorization subject to granting/issuing free of charge. | X |
| Sudan | Visa required | | Pre-arranged visa can be picked up on arrival. | ✓ |
| Suriname | Visa not required | 90 days | An entrance fee of USD 50 or EUR 50 must be paid online prior to arrival.; Multiple entry e-Visa is also available. | ✓ |
| Sweden | Visa required | | | ✓ |
| Switzerland | Visa required | | | ✓ |
| Syria | Visa on arrival | 15 days | Due to safety concerns, the Russian government advises its citizens not to visit Syria. | X |
| Tajikistan | Visa not required | Unlimited | | ✓ |
| Tanzania | eVisa / Visa on arrival | 90 days | | X |
| Thailand | Visa not required | 30 days | | ✓ |
| Timor-Leste | Visa on arrival | 30 days | Visa on arrival is only available at the Presidente Nicolau Lobato International Airport or at the Dili Sea Port.; Extension of stay is possible for up to 90 days. | X |
| Togo | eVisa | 15 days | | X |
| Tonga | Free visa on arrival | 31 days | Extension of stay is possible for additional 5 months. | X |
| Trinidad and Tobago | Visa not required | 90 days | | X |
| Tunisia | Visa not required | 3 months | | X |
| Turkey | Visa not required | 60 days | 60 days during one trip, no more than 90 days within any 180-day period. | X |
| Turkmenistan | Visa required | | 10-day visa on arrival if holding a letter of invitation provided by a company registered in Turkmenistan with a prior approval from the Foreign Ministry. Visitors can apply to extend their stay for an additional 10 days.; When transiting between two non-bordering countries, visitors can obtain a Turkmenistan transit visa for a five-day stay. This must be applied for in advance at the Turkmenistan Embassy. Visitors must also submit copies of the visas for the country of entry into Turkmenistan and the country of departure from Turkmenistan. Visa fee is 20 USD. | X |
| Tuvalu | Visa on arrival | 1 month | | X |
| Uganda | eVisa | 3 months | Can also be entered on an East Africa Tourist Visa issued by Kenya or Rwanda. | X |
| Ukraine | Visa required | | Due to the Russian invasion of Ukraine, obtaining a visa has become very difficult, with some exceptions. | X |
| United Arab Emirates | Visa not required | 90 days | 90 days within any 180-day period. | ✓ |
| United Kingdom and Crown dependencies | Visa required | | 24-hours visa-free visit : When in transit to/from Australia, Canada, New Zealand or USA, or; If holder of residence permit issued by Australia, Canada, New Zealand or USA, or; If holder of certain EEA or Switzerland visas, or; If holder of certain Irish visas. | ✓ |
| United States | Visa required | | Residents of the Chukotka Autonomous Okrug in Russia who are members of the indigenous population do not need a visa to visit Alaska if they have relatives (blood relatives, members of the same tribe, native people who have similar language and cultural heritage) in Alaska. Entry points are in Gambell and Nome. Individuals must be invited by a relative in Alaska, must notify local authorities at least ten days before traveling to Alaska, and must leave Alaska within 90 days. | ✓ |
| Uruguay | Visa not required | 3 months | 90 days within any 180-day period.; Extension of stay is possible for additional 90 days. | ✓ |
| Uzbekistan | Visa not required | Unlimited | | ✓ |
| Vanuatu | Visa not required | 120 days | | ✓ |
| Vatican City | Visa required | | Open border with Italy. | ✓ |
| Venezuela | Visa not required | 90 days | 90 days within any 180-day period.; Extension of stay is possible for additional 90 days. | ✓ |
| Vietnam | Visa not required | 45 days | 30 day visa-free on Phú Quốc.; A single entry e-Visa is available for 90 days. | X |
| Yemen | Visa required | | Due to safety concerns, the Russian government advises its citizens not to visit Yemen.; Separately, Yemen introduced an e-Visa system for visitors who meet certain eligibility requirements (group travel of 10 or more people, business trips, and transit etc.). | ✓ |
| Zambia | eVisa / Visa on arrival | 90 days | For those travelling to Zambia for business, the maximum stay is 30 days in any 1-year period.; Tourists are allowed 90 days in any 1-year period.; Also eligible for a universal visa allowing access to Zimbabwe. | X |
| Zimbabwe | eVisa / Visa on arrival | 1 month | For those travelling to Zimbabwe for business, a visa on arrival can also be issued for a maximum stay of 30 days.; Also eligible for a universal visa allowing access to Zambia. | X |

== Dependent, disputed, or restricted territories ==
Unrecognized or partially recognized countries

| Territory | Conditions of access | Notes |
|---|---|---|
| Abkhazia | Visa not required | 90 days; internal ID can be used. |
| Kosovo | Visa required | Visa is not required (in theory) for holders of a valid Laissez-Passer issued by United Nations Organizations, NATO, OSCE, Council of Europe or European Union, holders of valid travel documents issued by EU Member and Schengen States, United States of America, Canada, Australia and Japan based on the 1951 Convention on Refugee Status or the 1954 Convention on the Status of Stateless Persons, as well as holders of valid travel documents for foreigners (max. 15 days stay). |
| Northern Cyprus | Visa not required | |
| Palestine | Visa not required | Arrival by sea to Gaza Strip not allowed. |
| Sahrawi Arab Democratic Republic | Visa regime undefined | Undefined visa regime in the Western Sahara controlled territory. |
| Somaliland | Visa on arrival | 30 days for 30 USD, payable on arrival. |
| South Ossetia | Visa not required | Freedom of movement. Internal ID can be used. |
| Taiwan | eVisa | Temporary regime until July 6, 2027; Earlier visa-free regime was suspended in 2022 |
| Transnistria | Visa not required | Registration required after 24 hours. |

Dependent and autonomous territories

| Territory | Conditions of access | Notes |
China
| Hong Kong | Visa not required | 14 days |
| Macao | Visa not required | 30 days |
Denmark
| Faroe Islands | Visa required | |
| Greenland | Visa required | |
France
| Clipperton Island | Special permit required | |
| French Guiana | Visa required | Visa-free for 3 months within any 6-month period for each territory for holders a valid multiple-entry Schengen Member State 'C' visa issued by a French consular authority. The validity period of the visa must be between 6 months and 5 years. |
| French Polynesia | Visa required | Visa-free for 3 months within any 6-month period for each territory for holders a valid multiple-entry Schengen Member State 'C' visa issued by a French consular authority. The validity period of the visa must be between 6 months and 5 years. |
| Guadeloupe | Visa required | Visa-free for 3 months within any 6-month period for each territory for holders a valid multiple-entry Schengen Member State 'C' visa issued by a French consular authority. The validity period of the visa must be between 6 months and 5 years. |
| Martinique | Visa required | Visa-free for 3 months within any 6-month period for each territory for holders a valid multiple-entry Schengen Member State 'C' visa issued by a French consular authority. The validity period of the visa must be between 6 months and 5 years. |
| Saint Barthélemy | Visa required | Visa-free for 3 months within any 6-month period for each territory for holders a valid multiple-entry Schengen Member State 'C' visa issued by a French consular authority. The validity period of the visa must be between 6 months and 5 years. |
| Saint Martin | Visa required | Visa-free for 3 months within any 6-month period for each territory for holders a valid multiple-entry Schengen Member State 'C' visa issued by a French consular authority. The validity period of the visa must be between 6 months and 5 years. |
| Mayotte | Visa required | Visa-free for 3 months within any 6-month period for each territory for holders a valid multiple-entry Schengen Member State 'C' visa issued by a French consular authority. The validity period of the visa must be between 6 months and 5 years. |
| New Caledonia | Visa required | Visa-free for 3 months within any 6-month period for each territory for holders a valid multiple-entry Schengen Member State 'C' visa issued by a French consular authority. The validity period of the visa must be between 6 months and 5 years. |
| Réunion | Visa required | Visa-free for 3 months within any 6-month period for each territory for holders a valid multiple-entry Schengen Member State 'C' visa issued by a French consular authority. The validity period of the visa must be between 6 months and 5 years. |
| Saint Pierre and Miquelon | Visa required | Visa-free for 3 months within any 6-month period for each territory for holders a valid multiple-entry Schengen Member State 'C' visa issued by a French consular authority. The validity period of the visa must be between 6 months and 5 years. |
| Wallis and Futuna | Visa required | Visa-free for 3 months within any 6-month period for each territory for holders a valid multiple-entry Schengen Member State 'C' visa issued by a French consular authority. The validity period of the visa must be between 6 months and 5 years. |
Netherlands
| Aruba | Visa required | Holders of a valid visa issued by a Schengen Member State ('C' or 'D' visa), Ireland or United Kingdom do not require a visa for 90 days for each territory. |
| Bonaire | Visa required | Holders of a valid visa issued by a Schengen Member State ('C' or 'D' visa), Ireland or United Kingdom do not require a visa for 90 days for each territory. |
| Sint Eustatius | Visa required | Holders of a valid visa issued by a Schengen Member State ('C' or 'D' visa), Ireland or United Kingdom do not require a visa for 90 days for each territory. |
| Saba | Visa required | Holders of a valid visa issued by a Schengen Member State ('C' or 'D' visa), Ireland or United Kingdom do not require a visa for 90 days for each territory. |
| Curaçao | Visa required | Holders of a valid visa issued by a Schengen Member State ('C' or 'D' visa), Ireland, USA or United Kingdom do not require a visa for 90 days for each territory. |
| Sint Maarten | Visa required | Holders of a valid visa issued by a Schengen Member State ('C' or 'D' visa), Ireland or United Kingdom do not require a visa for 90 days for each territory. |
New Zealand
| Cook Islands | Visa not required | 31 days |
| Niue | Visa not required | 30 days |
| Tokelau | Permit required | |
Norway
| (Norway) Jan Mayen | Permit required | Permit issued by the local police required for staying for less than 24 hours and permit issued by the Norwegian police for staying for more than 24 hours. |
| (Norway) Svalbard | Freedom of movement | Unlimited period under Svalbard Treaty.; Practically, flights or ferries to Svalbard depart from Norway. Hence double entry Schengen visa would be required to go and come back from Svalbard to mainland Norway.; Nonetheless, Svalbard has port facilities with border control. Visiting on private boat possible, but subject to prior notification. |
United Kingdom
| Akrotiri and Dhekelia | Visa required | |
| Anguilla | eVisa | Holders of valid UK, US and Canadian visas and/or residency permits do not require a visa for 3 months. |
| Bermuda | Visa required | Holders of a multiple-entry visa issued by Canada, USA or the United Kingdom valid for at least 45 days beyond the period of intended stay in Bermuda do not require a visa for 3 months. Visa-free for a maximum stay of 3 months if transiting through the United Kingdom. |
| British Indian Ocean Territory | Special permit required | |
| British Virgin Islands | Visa required | |
| Cayman Islands | eVisa | |
| Falkland Islands (Malvinas) | Visa required | Visa not required for transit and cruise ship passengers |
| Gibraltar | Visa required | Visa required to come into Gibraltar except: Persons holding a Gibraltar Civilian Registration Card; Persons holding an EU Residence permit; Persons holding a Schengen visa; A UK residence permit or UK visa does not entitle the holder to enter Gibraltar. |
| Montserrat | eVisa | |
| Pitcairn Islands | Visa not required | 14 days visa-free and landing fee USD 35 or tax of USD 5 if not going ashore. |
| Saint Helena | eVisa | |
| Ascension Island | Admission refused | From May 2015, the Ascension Island Government does not issue entry visas including e-Visa to nationals of Russia. |
| Tristan da Cunha | Permission required | Permission to land required for 15/30 pounds sterling (yacht/ship passenger) for Tristan da Cunha Island or 20 pounds sterling for Gough Island, Inaccessible Island or Nightingale Islands. |
| South Georgia and the South Sandwich Islands | Permit required | Pre-arrival permit from the Commissioner required (72 hours / 1 month for 110 / 160 pounds sterling). |
| Turks and Caicos Islands | Visa required | Russian passport holders who are lawful residents of the United Kingdom, United States of America or Canada, or who are holders of a valid visa permitting their travel to any of these three countries, may be granted leave to enter the Islands without a Turks and Caicos Islands visa. |
United States
| American Samoa | Entry permit required | |
| Guam | Visa required | |
| Northern Mariana Islands | Visa required | |
| Puerto Rico | Visa required | |
| U.S. Virgin Islands | Visa required | |
Antarctica and adjacent islands
Special permits required for Bouvet Island, British Antarctic Territory, French Southern and Antarctic Lands, Argentine Antarctica, (Australia) Australian Antarctic Territory, (Antártica Chilena Province) Chilean Antarctic Territory, (Australia) Heard Island and McDonald Islands, (Norway) Peter I Island, (Norway) Queen Maud Land, (New Zealand) Ross Dependency.

Other territories

- Australia. Ashmore and Cartier Islands - Special authorisation required.
- China. Hainan - Visa-free for 30 days. Available at Haikou Meilan International Airport and Sanya Phoenix International Airport.
- China. Tibet Autonomous Region - Tibet Travel Permit required (USD 10).
- Colombia. San Andrés and Leticia - Visitors arriving at Gustavo Rojas Pinilla International Airport and Alfredo Vásquez Cobo International Airport must buy tourist cards on arrival.
- Ecuador. Galápagos - 60 days; Visitors must pre-register to receive a 20 USD Transit Control Card (TCT).
- Eritrea outside Asmara - To travel in the rest of the country, a Travel Permit for Foreigners is required (20 Eritrean nakfa).
- Fiji. Lau Province - Special permission required.
- Greece. Mount Athos - Special permit required (4 days: EUR 25 for Orthodox visitors, EUR 35 for non-Orthodox visitors, EUR 18 for students). There is a visitors' quota: maximum 100 Orthodox and 10 non-Orthodox per day and women are not allowed.
- India. Protected Area Permit (PAP) required for whole states of Nagaland and Sikkim and parts of states Manipur, Arunachal Pradesh, Uttaranchal, Jammu and Kashmir, Rajasthan, Himachal Pradesh. Restricted Area Permit (RAP) required for all of Andaman and Nicobar Islands and parts of Sikkim. Some of these requirements are occasionally lifted for a year.
- Iran. Kish Island - Visa not required.
- Iraq. Kurdistan - You can apply for an e-Visa (30 days) to visit the Iraqi Kurdistan Region.
- Kazakhstan. Closed cities - Special permission required for the town of Baikonur and surrounding areas in Kyzylorda Oblast, and the town of Gvardeyskiy near Almaty.
- North Korea outside Pyongyang - Special permit required. People are not allowed to leave the capital city, tourists can only leave the capital with a governmental tourist guide (no independent moving).
- Malaysia. Sabah and Sarawak - Visa not required. These states have their own immigration authorities and passport is required to travel to them, however the same visa applies.
- Saudi Arabia Mecca and Medina - Special access required. Non-Muslims and those following the Ahmadiyya religious movement are strictly prohibited from entry.
- Sudan. Darfur - Separate travel permit is required.
- Sudan outside Khartoum - All foreigners traveling more than 25 kilometers outside of Khartoum must obtain a travel permit.
- Tajikistan. Gorno-Badakhshan Autonomous Province - OIVR permit required (15+5 Tajikistani Somoni) and another special permit (free of charge) is required for Lake Sarez.
- Turkmenistan. Closed cities - A special permit, issued prior to arrival by Ministry of Foreign Affairs, is required if visiting the following places: Atamurat, Cheleken, Dashoguz, Serakhs and Serhetabat.
- United States. Closed city of Mercury, Nevada, United States - Special authorization is required for entry into Mercury.
- United States. United States Minor Outlying Islands - Special permits required for Baker Island, Howland Island, Jarvis Island, Johnston Atoll, Kingman Reef, Midway Atoll, Palmyra Atoll and Wake Island.
- Venezuela. Margarita Island - Visa not required. All visitors are fingerprinted.
- Vietnam. Phú Quốc - Visa not required for 30 days.
- Yemen outside Sana'a or Aden - Special permission needed for travel outside Sana'a or Aden.
- United Nations UN Buffer Zone in Cyprus - Access Permit is required for travelling inside the zone, except Civil Use Areas.
- United Nations Korean Demilitarized Zone - Restricted area.
- United Nations UNDOF Zone and Ghajar - Restricted area.

== Visa replacement ==
Certain countries waive the visa requirement if the visitor is in the possession of a valid visa or residence card of another country.

- Albania, Andorra, Cyprus, Gibraltar, North Macedonia - Visa exempt for holders of a multiple entry visa type С or D or a valid residence permit issued by a Schengen Member State.
- Mexico - Permanent residents of Canada, EU or USA; or holders of a valid USA visa do not require a visa.

== Non-ordinary passports ==
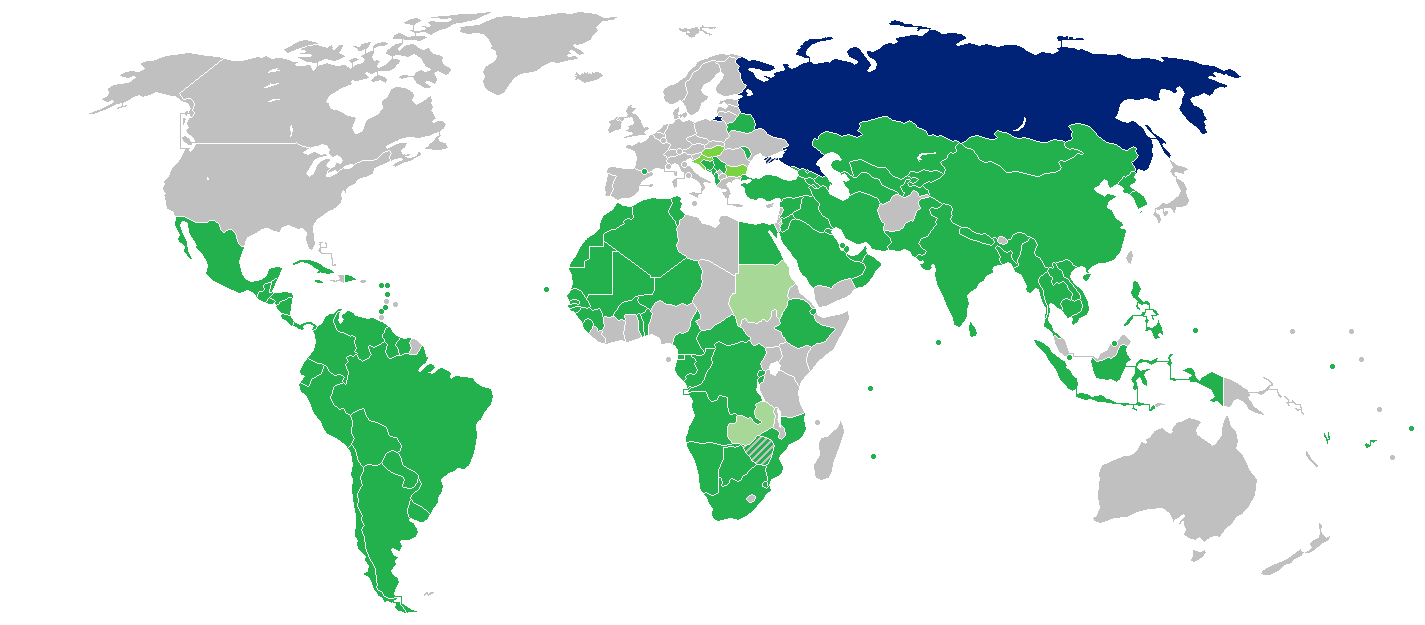
Visa requirements for Russian citizens holding diplomatic or official / service passports based on bilateral agreements Russia Visa-free for holders of both diplomatic and service passports Visa-free for holders of official passports only Visa-free for holders of diplomatic passports only

Holders of Russian diplomatic or official / service passports may enter the following countries without a visa for 90 days (unless otherwise stated):

- Abkhazia
- Albania
- Algeria^{4}
- Andorra^{3}
- Angola
- Antigua and Barbuda^{4}
- Argentina^{2}
- Armenia
- Azerbaijan
- Bahrain^{4}
- Bangladesh^{6}
- Belarus^{1}
- Belize^{4}
- Benin
- Bolivia^{2}
- Bosnia and Herzegovina
- Botswana
- Brazil
- Brunei^{7}
- Bulgaria^{4} ^{O}
- Burkina Faso
- Burundi^{4}
- Cabo Verde
- Cambodia
- Cameroon^{4}
- Central African Republic^{4}
- Chile^{2}
- China^{6}
- Colombia
- Congo
- Costa Rica^{2}
- Croatia^{4} ^{O}
- Cuba^{4}
- Djibouti^{4}
- Dominica^{4}
- Dominican Republic
- DR Congo^{4}
- Ecuador
- Egypt
- El Salvador
- Equatorial Guinea^{4}
- Eswatini^{4}
- Ethiopia
- Fiji
- Gabon
- Gambia
- Georgia
- Grenada^{4}
- Guatemala^{2}
- Guinea
- Guinea-Bissau
- Guyana
- Honduras
- Hungary^{4} ^{O}
- India
- Indonesia^{7}
- Iran^{6}
- Iraq^{6}
- Jamaica
- Jordan^{4}
- Kazakhstan
- Kuwait^{4}
- Kyrgyzstan
- Laos^{6}
- Maldives
- Mali
- Mauritania
- Mauritius^{5}
- Mexico
- Moldova
- Mongolia^{6}
- Montenegro
- Morocco
- Mozambique^{6}
- Myanmar
- Namibia^{4}
- Nauru^{7}
- Nepal
- Nicaragua
- Niger^{4}
- North Korea
- North Macedonia
- Oman
- Pakistan
- Palau
- Palestine^{4} ^{D}
- Panama
- Paraguay^{2}
- Peru
- Philippines
- Qatar^{4}
- Rwanda^{4}
- Saint Kitts and Nevis^{4}
- Saint Vincent and the Grenadines^{4}
- Samoa^{5}
- Saudi Arabia^{4}
- Senegal
- Serbia
- Seychelles^{6}
- Sierra Leone^{4}
- Singapore
- South Africa
- South Korea
- South Ossetia^{1}
- Sri Lanka^{6}
- Sudan^{4} ^{D}
- Suriname^{4}
- Syria
- Tajikistan
- Thailand
- Togo^{4}
- Tunisia^{4}
- Turkey
- Turkmenistan^{6}
- Ukraine
- United Arab Emirates^{4}
- Uruguay^{2}
- Uzbekistan
- Vanuatu
- Venezuela
- Vietnam
- Zambia^{4} ^{D}
- Zimbabwe^{8}

_{D - Diplomatic passports only.}
_{O - Official passports only.}
_{1 - Unlimited}
_{2 - 3 months}
_{3 - 90 days within any 365-day period.}
_{4 - 90 days within any 180-day period.}
_{5 - 60 days}
_{6 - 30 days}
_{7 - 14 days}
_{8 - Applies only to employees of official institutions operating in the territory of a contracting parties and their families.}

Longer period of stay or more beneficial terms than that for ordinary passport holders is provided by Argentina, Bosnia and Herzegovina, Brazil, Chile, Colombia, Guatemala, Guyana, Honduras, South Korea, Montenegro, Nicaragua, North Macedonia, Panama, Paraguay, Peru, Philippines, El Salvador, Serbia, Thailand, Turkey, Uruguay and Venezuela.

Holders of diplomatic and service Russian passports do not have visa-free access to Israel.

== Economic integration and international treaties ==
Special travel conditions and exceptions to the usual rules, including special migration rules for Russian citizens, their family members and conditions for the provision of medical care are provided through international agreements and treaties to Russian citizens. The conditions for citizens in a specific country should be clarified in advance because not all countries are parties to all agreements.

- Union State of Russia and Belarus (Belarus)
- The rules of the Single Economic Space of the Eurasian Economic Union (Armenia, Belarus, Kazakhstan, Kyrgyzstan)
- Mobility rights arrangements of the Commonwealth of Independent States (present and former countries of the Commonwealth of Independent States, including de jure Ukraine and Georgia, but not Turkmenistan)

== APEC Business Travel Card ==
Full members of the scheme Transitional members (United States, Canada)

Holders of an APEC Business Travel Card (ABTC) travelling on business do not require a visa to the following countries:

- Australia^{2}
- Brunei^{2}
- Chile^{2}
- China^{3}
- Hong Kong^{3}
- Indonesia^{3}
- Japan^{2}
- Malaysia^{2}
- Mexico^{1}
- New Zealand^{2}
- Papua New Guinea^{3}
- Peru^{2}
- Philippines^{3}
- Singapore^{3}
- South Korea^{2}
- Taiwan^{2}
- Thailand^{2}
- Vietnam^{3}

_{1 - Up to 180 days}
_{2 - Up to 90 days}
_{3 - Up to 60 days}

The card must be used in conjunction with a passport and has the following advantages:

- No need to apply for a visa or entry permit to APEC countries, as the card is treated as such (except by Canada and United States)
- Undertake legitimate business in participating economies
- Expedited border crossing in all member economies, including transitional members

== Limitations on passport use ==
- Arab League - As a result of the Arab League boycott of Israel, many Arab League countries refuse entry to travelers whose passport shows evidence of entry into Israel or even hold an unused Israeli visa.
- Iran - Admission is refused for holders of passports containing an Israeli visa/stamp in the last 12 months.
- Azerbaijan - As part of the anti-Armenian policies of Azerbaijan, Azerbaijan refuses entry to individuals of Armenian descent, including those who hold Russian Federation or other passports. It also strictly refuses entry to foreigners in general whose passport shows evidence of entry into the self-proclaimed Nagorno-Karabakh Republic, declaring them a so-called personae non gratae.

== Vaccination ==
Many African countries, including Angola, Benin, Burkina Faso, Cameroon, Central African Republic, Chad, Democratic Republic of the Congo, Republic of the Congo, Côte d'Ivoire, Equatorial Guinea, Gabon, Ghana, Guinea, Liberia, Mali, Mauritania, Niger, Rwanda, São Tomé and Príncipe, Senegal, Sierra Leone, Uganda, Zambia require all incoming passengers to have a current International Certificate of Vaccination. Some other countries require vaccination only if the passenger is coming from an infected area.

== Passport validity ==
Many countries require passport validity of no less than 6 months and one or two blank pages.

== Foreign travel statistics ==
According to the national statistics these are the numbers of Russian visitors arriving to various countries per annum:

Foreign travel statistics
| Destination | Number of visitors from Russia | Year |
|---|---|---|
| Abkhazia | Georgia | 4,357,937 | 2017 |
| Afghanistan | 1,463 | 2017 |
| American Samoa | 6 | 2016 |
| Angola | 7,305 | 2015 |
| Antarctica | 330 | 2017 |
| Antigua and Barbuda | 372 | 2017 |
| Argentina | 8,138 | 2015 |
| Armenia | 410,302 | 2017 |
| Aruba | 968 | 2015 |
| Australia | 15,200 | 2017 |
| Austria (Note: Counting only guests in tourist accommodation establishments.) | 272,300 | 2016 |
| Azerbaijan | 744,125 | 2016 |
| Bahamas | 1,498 | 2015 |
| Bahrain | 12,712 | 2017 |
| Barbados | 909 | 2016 |
| Belgium | 60,386 | 2016 |
| Belarus | 1,230,000 | 2017 |
| Bermuda (Note: Data for arrivals by air only.) | 101 | 2015 |
| Bhutan | 243 | 2016 |
| Bolivia | 1,745 | 2016 |
| Bosnia and Herzegovina | 5,268 | 2017 |
| Botswana | 1,065 | 2015 |
| Brazil | 18,820 | 2017 |
| Bulgaria | 522,085 | 2018 |
| Cambodia | 53,164 | 2016 |
| Cameroon | 7,151 | 2014 |
| Canada | 24,401 | 2017 |
| Cayman Islands | 65 | 2017 |
| Chile | 6,003 | 2017 |
| China | 1,976,000 | 2016 |
| Colombia | 5,157 | 2015 |
| Congo | 4,023 | 2012 |
| Costa Rica | 4,657 | 2017 |
| Croatia | 119,689 | 2017 |
| Cuba | 75,000 | 2017 |
| Cyprus | 63,778 | 2025 |
| Czech Republic | 551,191 | 2017 |
| Denmark | 41,002 | 2017 |
| Dominica | 44 | 2015 |
| Dominican Republic | 245,346 | 2017 |
| Ecuador | 7,313 | 2014 |
| Egypt | 2,338,900 | 2015 |
| Estonia | 1,803,249 / 238,636 | 2017 |
| Finland | 3,629,121 / 373,701 | 2018 |
| France | 620,028 | 2015 |
| French Polynesia | 287 | 2017 |
| Georgia | 1,579,764 | 2025 |
| Germany | 607,422 | 2016 |
| Greece | 512,789 | 2015 |
| Guam | 3,352 | 2017 |
| Guatemala | 2,576 | 2014 |
| Hong Kong | 148,098 | 2017 |
| Hungary | 138,941 | 2016 |
| Iceland | 14,282 | 2018 |
| India | 278,904 | 2017 |
| Indonesia | 88,520 | 2016 |
| Iran | 24,336 | 2017 |
| Iraq | 2,451 | 2017 |
| Israel | 330,500 | 2017 |
| Italy | 864,000 | 2016 |
| Jamaica | 1,018 | 2017 |
| Japan | 77,200 | 2017 |
| Jordan | 49,384 | 2016 |
| Kazakhstan | 1,708,873 | 2017 |
| Kyrgyzstan | 471,400 | 2017 |
| Laos | 10,986 | 2017 |
| Latvia | 424,842 / 241,435 | 2017 |
| Lebanon | 16,205 | 2016 |
| Lithuania | 742,333 / 150,600 | 2016 |
| Luxembourg | 6,659 | 2016 |
| Macao | 27,037 | 2017 |
| Madagascar | 264 | 2015 |
| Malaysia | 67,564 | 2017 |
| Maldives | 61,931 | 2017 |
| Malta | 16,370 | 2016 |
| Malawi | 154 | 2009 |
| Mali | 444 | 2014 |
| Mauritius | 11,153 | 2017 |
| Mexico | 32,337 | 2015 |
| Moldova | 314,266 | 2017 |
| Monaco | 46,000 | 2016 |
| Mongolia | 106,935 | 2017 |
| Montenegro | 316,826 | 2016 |
| Morocco | 20,000 | 2017 |
| Myanmar | 5,487 | 2016 |
| Namibia | 2,943 | 2015 |
| Netherlands | 175,000 | 2017 |
| New Zealand | 6,640 | 2017 |
| Nicaragua | 1,464 | 2016 |
| North Macedonia | 4,213 | 2016 |
| Northern Mariana Islands | 2,130 | 2017 |
| North Korea | 9,985 | 2025 |
| Norway | 138,902 | 2017 |
| Oman | 4,858 | 2017 |
| Pakistan | 2,500 | 2009 |
| Palau | 337 | 2016 |
| Panama | 4,525 | 2015 |
| Papua New Guinea | 414 | 2016 |
| Peru | 8,648 | 2017 |
| Philippines | 33,279 | 2017 |
| Poland | 2,052,400 | 2016 |
| Portugal | 98,000 | 2015 |
| Qatar | 87,595 | 2017 |
| Romania | 66,734 | 2016 |
| Saudi Arabia | 7,745 | 2017 |
| Serbia | 184,609 | 2024 |
| Seychelles | 13,191 | 2017 |
| Singapore | 80,134 | 2017 |
| Slovakia | 35,919 | 2016 |
| Slovenia | 51,803 | 2017 |
| South Africa | 7,244 | 2015 |
| South Korea | 270,427 | 2017 |
| South Ossetia | 451,918 | 2017 |
| Spain | 1,222,426 | 2018 |
| Sri Lanka | 59,191 | 2017 |
| Sudan | 268 | 2017 |
| Suriname | 72 | 2017 |
| Sweden | 63,689 | 2017 |
| Switzerland | 251,142 | 2017 |
| Taiwan | 9,226 | 2017 |
| Tajikistan | 212,062 | 2019 |
| Tanzania | 7,435 | 2016 |
| Thailand | 1,898,837 | 2025 |
| Tunisia | 520,000 | 2017 |
| Turkey | 5,964,631 | 2018 |
| Turkmenistan | 27,490 | 2017 |
| Ukraine | 1,464,764 | 2017 |
| United Arab Emirates | 530,000 | 2017 |
| United Kingdom | 199,000 | 2017 |
| United States (Note: Total number includes tourists, business travelers, students, exchange visitors, temporary workers and families, diplomats and other representatives and all other classes of nonimmigrant admissions (I-94).) | 344,368 | 2017 |
| Uruguay | 3,114 | 2015 |
| Uzbekistan | 567,700 | 2022 |
| Venezuela | 9,035 | 2013 |
| Vietnam | 574,164 | 2017 |

== See also ==
- Visa policy of Russia
- Russian passport
- List of diplomatic missions in Russia
- Visa history of Russia

== References and notes ==
Notes
