= 2019 Monegasque communal elections =

Elections in Monaco

The 2019 Monegasque communal elections were held in Monaco on 17 March 2019 to elect the 15 members of the Communal Council of Monaco.

== Electoral system ==
Monegasque citizens over 18 are entitled to vote. The 15 councillors were elected for a four-year period in a single multi-member constituency using plurality-at-large voting with a two-round system. A majority of the votes was required to be elected. The second round would have been held one week after the first round. The Mayor of Monaco was elected by the councillors after the election. Candidates were required to be at least 21 years old and to have the Monegasque nationality for at least 5 years.

== Results ==
=== Summary ===
Party	Votes	%	Seats
Communal Evolution	43,067	100	15
Total	43,067	100	15
Valid ballots	3,291	96.5	
Blank ballots	173	5.1	
Invalid ballots	118	3.4	
Total	3,409	100	
Registered voters/turnout	7,332	46.49	
Source: Mairie de Monaco

=== Full results ===
Party	Candidates	Votes	Total party votes	%	Seats
Communal Evolution	Chloé Boscagli-Leclercq	2,978	43,067	100	15
Communal Evolution	Marjorie Crovetto-Harroch	2,953	43,067	100	15
Communal Evolution	Camille Svara	2,952	43,067	100	15
Communal Evolution	Axelle Amalberti-Verdino	2,946	43,067	100	15
Communal Evolution	Claude Bollati	2,937	43,067	100	15
Communal Evolution	Charles Maricic	2,936	43,067	100	15
Communal Evolution	Karyn Ardisson-Salopek	2,934	43,067	100	15
Communal Evolution	Mélanie Flachaire	2,908	43,067	100	15
Communal Evolution	François Lallemand	2,907	43,067	100	15
Communal Evolution	André J. Campana	2,904	43,067	100	15
Communal Evolution	Nicolas Croesi	2,895	43,067	100	15
Communal Evolution	Jacques Pastor	2,894	43,067	100	15
Communal Evolution	Jean-Marc Deoriti-Castellini	2,753	43,067	100	15
Communal Evolution	Françoise Gamerdinger	2,747	43,067	100	15
Communal Evolution	Georges Marsan	2,723	43,067	100	15
Source: Mairie de Monaco
