= Monégasque identity card =

National identity card of Monaco

- The front and reverse of an old Monégasque identity card
- Type: Compulsory identity card
- Issued by: Monaco
- Purpose: Proof of identity
- Valid in: European Union (except Bulgaria, Cyprus, Ireland, and Sweden); Rest of Europe (except Belarus, North Macedonia, Russia, Serbia, Ukraine, and United Kingdom) Overseas France; Montserrat (max. 14 days)
- Eligibility: Monégasque citizenship
- Expiration: 5 years

The Monégasque identity card (French: Carte d’identité monégasque électronique) or CIME is issued to Monégasque citizens by the Monaco City Hall. It can be used as a travel document when visiting countries in the Schengen Area (except Bulgaria and Sweden), the CEFTA states (except North Macedonia and Serbia) as well as Andorra, Gibraltar, and Montserrat (max.14 days). The card is produced for the Monaco City Hall by Oberthur Technologies.

Since 30 March 2009, Monégasque identity cards have been issued containing a biometric chip. Validity of the card is 5 years from the date of issue.

== See also ==
- Monégasque passport
