= Monégasque passport =

Passport of the Principality of Monaco

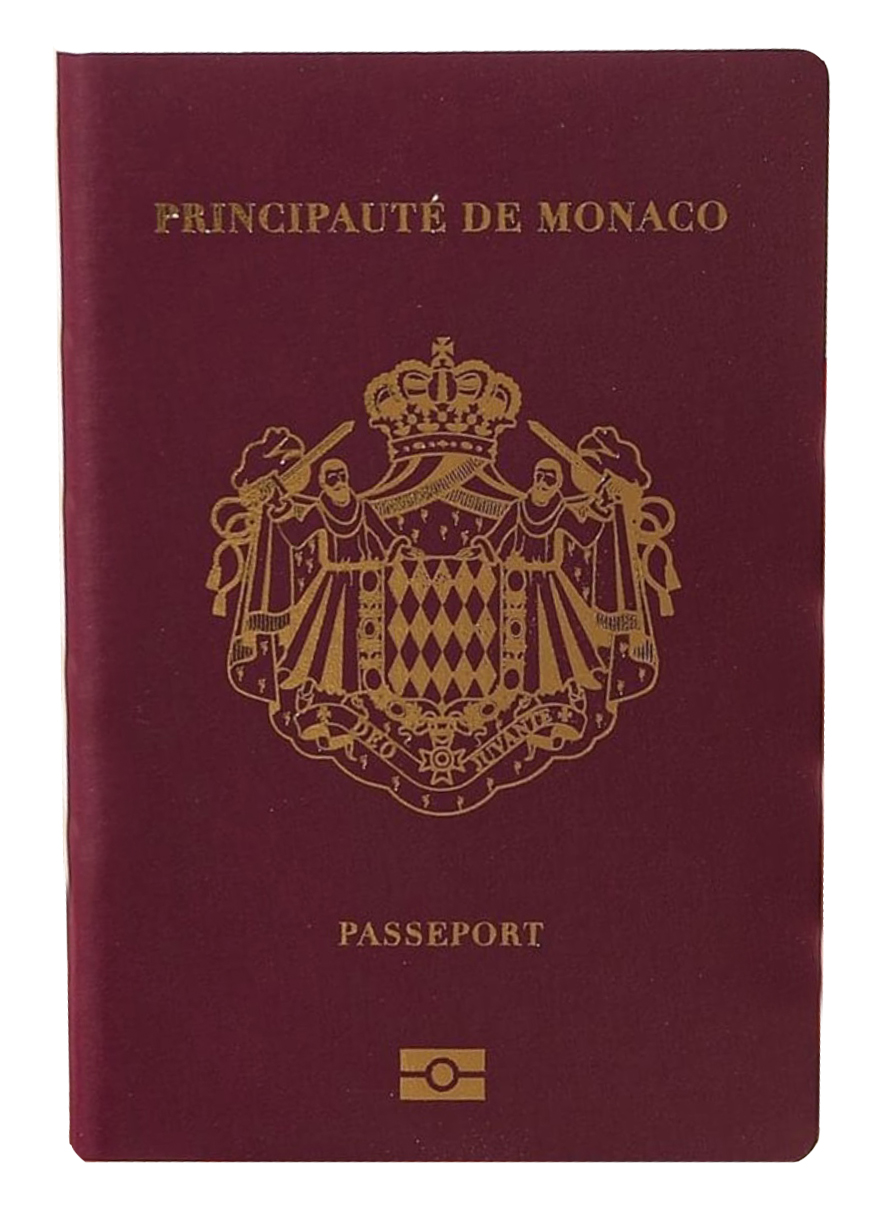
- Monégasque biometric passport front cover
- Type: Passport
- Issued by: Minister of State; General Secretriat of the Government Passport Department
- Purpose: Identification
- Eligibility: Monégasque citizenship
- Expiration: 3 years (Child aged 0-2) 5 years (Child aged 3-17) 10 years (Adult aged 18+)
- Cost: EUR30.00 (Child aged 0-2) EUR60.00 (Child aged 3-17) EUR90.00 (Adult aged 18+)

The Monégasque passport is issued to citizens of Monaco for international travel. In 2009 there were an estimated 6,000 in circulation. The passport is burgundy in colour and has the national coat of arms and the words "Principauté de Monaco" (Principality of Monaco) on it.

== Visa requirements ==
As of 05 January 2021, Monégasque citizens had visa-free or visa on arrival access to 174 countries and territories, ranking the Monégasque passport 15th overall (tied with Chile and Cyprus) in terms of travel freedom according to the Henley Passport Index, making it the highest ranking passport of any European country not belonging to either the European Union or EFTA.

Visa requirements for Monégasque citizens Monaco Freedom of movement Visa not required Visa available both on arrival or online Visa on arrival eVisa Visa required

== See also ==
- Visa requirements for Monégasque citizens
- Citizenship law of Monaco
- Monégasque identity card
