= Jean-Louis Campora =

Monegasque politician

- Born: 19 November 1938 (age 87); Monaco
- Occupations: Physician, businessman, politician
- Parent: Charles Campora
- Relatives: Anne-Marie Campora (sister)

Jean-Louis Campora (born 19 November 1938) is a Monegasque physician, politician and businessman. He served as the president of AS Monaco FC, the national football club of Monaco, from 1975 to 2003, and as the president of the National Council from 1993 to 2003.

== Early life and family background ==
Jean-Louis Campora was born on 19 November 1938 in Monaco. His father, Charles Campora, served as the president of the AS Monaco FC, the national football club of Monaco. His twin sister, Anne-Marie Campora, served as the mayor of Monaco from 1991 to 2003.

Campora served as the president of the youth wing of the Monegasque Red Cross at the age of sixteen. He received a degree in medical studies.

== Career ==
Campora started his career as a physician in Monaco. He served as the president of the Ordre des Médecins de Monaco for ten years. Additionally, he served as the director of the internal medicine of the Princess Grace Hospital Centre, the only public hospital in Monaco.

Campora served as a member of the National Council from 1973 to 1993, and as its president from 1993 to 2003.

Campora served as the president of the AS Monaco FC from 1975 to 2003. Ten years later, he served as its vice president from January 2013 to August 2013.

== Personal life ==
Campora resides in a gated community in Roquebrune-Cap-Martin, outside Monaco. He is separated from his wife. In December 2009, his house was burglarised. The two burglars were tried in May 2012.
