= Visa policy of Monaco =

Policy on permits required to enter Monaco

Monaco does not have a visa policy of its own and the Schengen Visa policy applies. Although Monaco is not part of the European Union, or the Schengen Agreement, its territory is part of the Schengen Area by virtue of its customs Union with France as a result of the "Convention on Good Neighbourly Relations of 18 May 1963 on the entry, stay and establishment of foreigners in Monaco" between France and Monaco. The 1963 convention was adapted to allow Monaco to be administered within the Schengen Area as if it were part of France.

The entry and stay of foreigners in Monaco is defined by the Ordinance n. 3.153 of 19 March 1964 concerning the conditions of entry and residence of foreigners in the Principality. Both French and Monégasque authorities carry out checks at Monaco's seaport and heliport.

== Long term stay ==
Foreigners that desire to stay for a period longer than 3 months in Monaco require a resident permit.

== Souvenir passport stamp ==
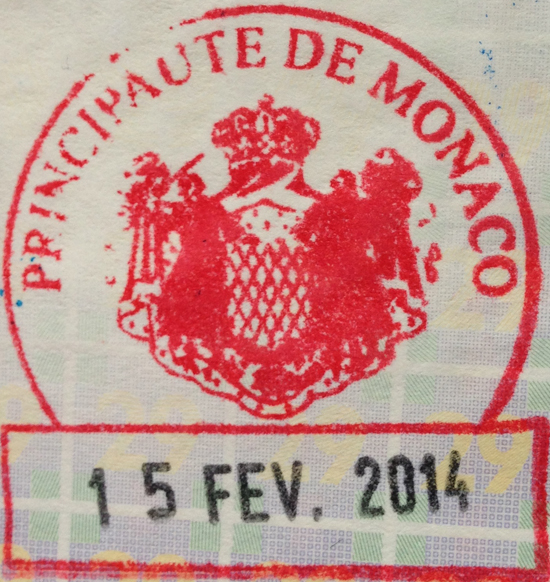
A souvenir passport stamp

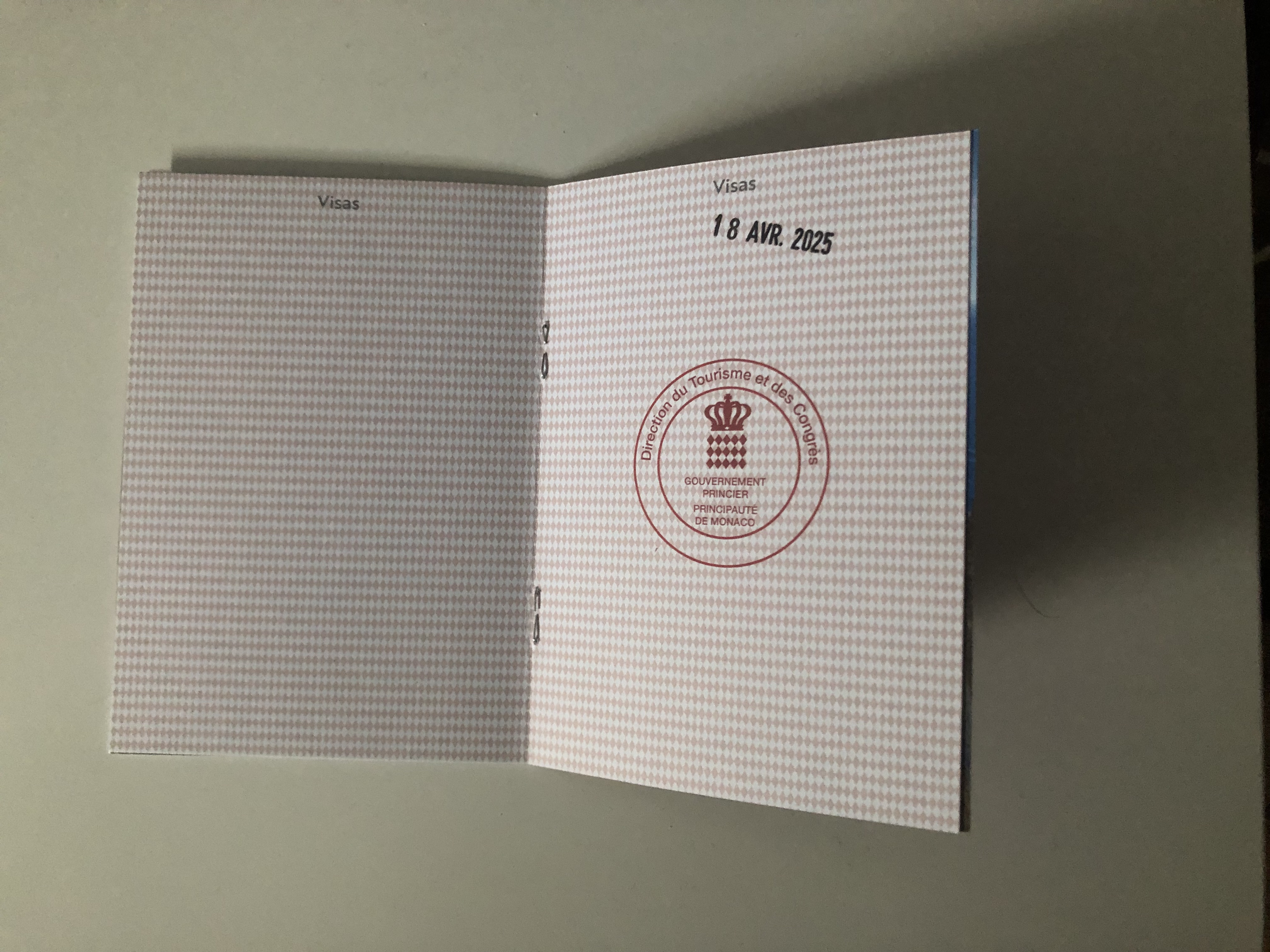
New replacement "Souvenir Passport", issued free of charge

When visiting Monaco, there is no passport control as it is impossible to enter except through France. Visitors were previously able to get souvenir passport stamps at a state tourism office. Official passports are no longer stamped as this may cause difficulties with validity. Instead, a special 'souvenir passport' is available free of charge, in which these stamps may instead be placed.

== See also ==
- Visa requirements for Monégasque citizens
- Visa policy of the Schengen Area
- List of diplomatic missions of Monaco
- Foreign relations of Monaco
