= Charles Campora =

Monegasque businessman

- Occupation: Businessman
- Spouse: Gilberte Médecin
- Children: Jean-Louis Campora; Anne-Marie Campora

Charles Campora was a Monegasque biologist and businessman. He was the president of AS Monaco FC, the national football club of Monaco, in 1954-55 and 1957-59.

Campora married Gilberte Médecin. They had twins: a son, Jean-Louis Campora, and a daughter, Anne-Marie Campora.
