= Monina Cámpora =

Dominican artist

- Born: Hilda Caridad Cámpora Bello; September 26, 1914; Santo Domingo, Dominican Republic
- Died: April 24, 1998 (aged 83); San Juan de la Maguana, Dominican Republic
- Education: National Conservatory of Music
- Occupations: Orchestra director, pianist, teacher

Hilda Caridad Cámpora Bello (September 26, 1914 – April 24, 1998), better known as Monina Cámpora, was a Dominican artist known for founding the School of Fine Arts in the city of San Juan de la Maguana and for being the first woman in the Dominican Republic to organize and conduct a women's orchestra.

== Biography ==
Cámpora was born on September 26, 1914, in Santo Domingo. She married lawyer Lorenzo E. Piña Puello, and their son was sportswriter Lorenzo Antonio Piña Cámpora.

She studied at the Liceo Musical, directed by José de Jesús Ravelo, and obtained the degree of piano teacher upon graduating from the National Conservatory of Music's superior piano course. She went on to teach at the Liceo Musical, the Colegio Luis Muñoz Rivera, and other schools in Santo Domingo.

She organized the "reign of flowers", created a radio program, planned plays, and directed dance parties and fiestas patronales. In 1936, inspired by a similar group visiting from Cuba, she recruited fifteen women and founded the first Dominican female orchestra, named Monina Cámpora and Her Group.

In 1964, Cámpora founded the School of Fine Arts in San Juan de la Maguana, which offers courses in painting, sculpture, dance, music, and theater.

Cámpora continued to teach music, crafts, and dance into her seventies. She died in San Juan de la Maguana on April 24, 1998.

== Legacy ==
For her dedication, Cámpora received the title of Local Mother of Fine Arts. In addition, the School of Fine Arts of San Juan de la Maguana was named after her in August 1998. The Monina Cámpora Cultural Center holds presentations and specialized workshops in the area of theater and cinema.

== See also ==
- Karina Pasian
