= Georges Marsan =

Monégasque politician (born 1957)

Mayor of Monaco
- Incumbent
- Assumed office 1 April 2003
- Preceded by: Anne-Marie Campora

Personal details
- Born: 20 March 1957 (age 69)
- Children: 3
- Education: University of Montpellier
- Occupation: Pharmacist

Georges Marsan (born 20 March 1957) is a Monégasque politician serving as mayor of Monaco since 2003. A member of the Communal Evolution (EC) party, he was first elected to the Communal Council of Monaco in 1991. Marsan is a pharmacist by trade.

== Early life ==
Georges Marsan was born in 1957. Both his father Gérard and grandfather Antoine were pharmacists. The family pharmacy was established on Rue Grimaldi in 1908. Shortly after, it was relocated to the Place d'Armes in La Condamine. Meanwhile, one of his grandfathers was a neighbourhood mayor who helped write the Constitution of Monaco in 1911 in the wake of the Monégasque Revolution.

Marsan graduated from the University of Montpellier in pharmacy in 1979.

== Career ==
Marsan started his career as a pharmacist in the family business on the Place d'Armes. He serves as president of the Ordre des Pharmaciens de Monaco. In 1991, Marsan was asked to run for the Monaco Communal Council by now-former Mayor Anne-Marie Campora; he was elected.

He has served as mayor of Monaco since 2003. He has been elected five times (2003, 2007, 2011, 2015, 2019). He was the sole candidate in 2011 and 2019. He won by 75% in 2015.

Marsan is Grand Officer of the Order of Saint-Charles.

== Personal life ==
Marsan is married. He has a son and two daughters.

== See also ==
- 2019 Monegasque municipal elections

Political offices
Preceded by Anne-Marie Campora	Mayors of Monaco; 2003–present	Succeeded by Incumbent
