= Anne-Marie Campora =

Monegasque politician

- Born: 19 November 1938
- Died: 12 November 2015 (aged 76)
- Resting place: Monaco Cemetery
- Occupation: Politician
- Parent: Charles Campora
- Relatives: Jean-Louis Campora (twin brother)

Anne-Marie Campora (19 November 1938 – 12 November 2015) was a Monegasque politician.

== Early life and family background ==
Anne-Marie Campora was born in 1938. Her father, Charles Campora, served as the president of AS Monaco FC, the national football club of Monaco. Her twin brother, Jean-Louis Campora, served as the president of AS Monaco FC from 1975 to 2003, and as the president of the National Council from 1993 to 2003.

== Career ==
Campona served as the mayor of Monaco from 1991 to 2003. She was the first and only woman to serve as the mayor of Monaco.

== Death ==
Campora died on 12 November 2015. Her funeral was held at the Saint-Charles Church in Monaco. It was attended by Albert II, Prince of Monaco, mayor Georges Marsan, and all members of the Council of Government. Campora was buried in her family tomb at the Monaco Cemetery.

In September 2021, a public square in Monaco was named after her (Place Anne-Marie Campora).

Political offices
Preceded by Jean-Louis Médecin	Mayor of Monaco; 1991-2003	Succeeded by Georges Marsan
