= Monégasque nationality law =

Details of citizenship of Monaco

Monégasque Citizenship Act

Parliament of Monaco
- Long title: Loi n° 1.155 du 18 décembre 1992 relative à la nationalité
- Enacted by: Government of Monaco
- Enacted: 18 December 1992
- Status: Current legislation

Citizenship of Monaco is based primarily on the principle of jus sanguinis. In other words, citizenship is conferred primarily by birth to a Monégasque parent, irrespective of place of birth.

== Acquisition for Monégasque citizenship ==
=== By descent ===
Children who at the time of birth had a Monégasque father or mother that was born Monégasque (regardless of the place of birth) or acquired Monégasque citizenship by naturalisation, reintegration, or option are eligible for Monégasque citizenship.

In addition, children born to a mother of whom one of the ancestors in the same line was born Monégasque are eligible for Monégasque citizenship.

A child born out of wedlock will only qualify for Monégasque citizenship once recognised/legitimised by the parents' marriage.

=== By birth ===
Any person who is born in Monaco to unknown parents is Monégasque at birth.

=== By marriage ===
A foreign spouse can apply for Monégasque citizenship through a right of option after twenty years of marriage on condition that the spouses live together. In the case of the spouse's death, they must provide evidence that the widowhood was not followed by remarriage.

=== By declaration ===
After the age of 18, a person who was born in Monaco of a parent who was either born Monégasque or who had ancestors of the same branch born Monégasque but who has since renounced Monégasque citizenship can make a declaration before a Registrar provided that he lived in the Principality and proves that he has had his legal domicile or habitual residence there during his childhood.

In addition, those who were born before July 11, 1975, before the acquisition of Monégasque nationality by his father can also make a declaration without conditions concerning the place of birth or habitual residence or legal domicile.

=== By naturalisation ===
Those seeking to become Monégasque citizens via naturalisation are required to fulfill the following criteria and send their request on stamped paper addressed directly to the Prince:

- renounce any foreign nationality, or renounce the foreign nationality within six months of a positive decision;
- no longer be required to perform national service abroad;
- has resided in Monaco for a minimum of 10 continuous years since the age of 18 at the time of making the application (the Prince is entitled to waive this requirement if he considers the applicant to be "worthy of this favour")

Monégasque nationality is granted automatically to children who are under 18 when their father or mother surviving her husband (in the event of the death of the latter) obtains naturalisation.

== Loss of citizenship ==
A Monégasque automatically forfeits his/her citizenship if he/she:

- acquires a foreign nationality
- performs foreign military service without the prior authorisation of the government of Monaco
- is deemed to have "harmed the internal or external security" of Monaco

A Monégasque will retain their nationality upon adoption by a foreigner, if the adoptor's country doesn't automatically grant the adoptee nationality.

A Monégasque citizen may voluntarily renounce their citizenship.

Former Monégasque citizens may restore their former citizenship if their request on stamped paper directly to the Prince is successful.

== Dual citizenship ==
The voluntary acquisition of a foreign nationality is subject to the renunciation of Monégasque nationality. The naturalization of a person as a Monégasque is subject to that person's renunciation of the foreign nationality or nationalities.

Dual Monégasque and foreign nationalities remain possible. However, in certain cases, special provisions may exist.

For example, after 20 years of marriage to a Monégasque person, an applicant may obtain Monégasque nationality. In this case, the applicant is required to retain his or her original nationality. It is not possible for an applicant who has acquired Monégasque nationality in this way to pass it on to his or her children. However, if the applicant is a woman, not being herself born with Monégasque nationality, but having an ascendant born Monégasque, transmission to the children is automatic.

== Visa requirements for Monégasque citizens ==
Visa requirements for Monégasque citizens Monaco Freedom of movement Visa not required Visa available both on arrival or online Visa on arrival eVisa Visa required

In 2026, Monaco citizens had visa-free or visa on arrival access to 176 countries and territories, ranking the Monégasque passport 12th. Any Monégasque citizen may live in France without visa.

== See also ==
- Monégasque identity card
