= Communal Council of Monaco =

Body responsible for the civil administration of the four quartiers of Monaco

The Communal Council (French: Conseil communal; Monégasque: Cunsiyu cumünale) is the body responsible for the civil administration of the four quartiers of the Municipality of Monaco. Because Monaco is both a nation and a city, the council chooses the mayor of Monaco and his/her officers. It consists of fifteen members, elected by direct universal suffrage to four-year terms, and a mayor, selected by the members. It meets every three months. The main responsibilities of the city council and the mayor concern the social and cultural spheres. These responsibilities include support for daycares, home care for seniors, and the Academy of music, as well as organization of elections, granting of marriage licenses, and encouraging engagement in the life of the city.
