= List of mayors of Monaco =

Mayor of Monaco
- Maire de Monaco
- Incumbent; Georges Marsan since 1 April 2003
- Residence: Monaco
- Seat: Monaco City Hall
- Appointer: Communal Council
- Term length: 4 years
- Formation: 1911
- First holder: Jean-Louis Médecin

The Mayor of Monaco is the head of the municipal government, overseeing local administration and services and implementing decisions of the Communal Council.

== List ==
The following is a list of mayors of the Municipality of Monaco.

#	Name	Took office	Left office	Term	Source
1	Suffren Reymond	1911	1914	1 (Monte-Carlo)	
1	François Crovetto	1911	1914	1 (Monaco-Ville)	
1	Honoré Bellando	1911	1914	1 (La Condamine)	
2	Suffren Reymond	1918	1920	2	
3	Alexandre Médecin	1920	1929	1	
4	Eugène Marquet	1929	1930	1	
5	Charles Bernasconi	1930		1	
6	Louis Aureglia	1933	1944	1	
7	Charles Palmaro	1946	1955	1	
8	Robert Boisson	1955	1971	1	
9	Jean-Louis Médecin	1971	1991	5	
10	Anne-Marie Campora	1991	2003	3	
11	Georges Marsan	2003	Ongoing	4	
