= List of current members of the National Council of Monaco =

Members of the National Council (Monaco)

National Council Conseil national

Type
- Type: Unicameral

Leadership
- President: Brigitte Boccone-Pagès (Priorité Monaco)
- Vice President: Balthazar Seydoux (Priorité Monaco)
- Secretary General: Cédric Braquetti

Structure
- Seats: 24
- Political groups: Monégasque National Union (24)

Elections
- Voting system: Panachage under party-list proportional representation (16); Party-list proportional representation (8)
- Last election: 11 February 2018

Meeting place
- Monaco-Ville

Website
- www.conseil-national.mc/index.php

This is a list of the current 24 members of the National Council of Monaco. The current members were elected in the 2018 general election.

1	Brigitte Boccone-Pagès (b. 1959)	Priorité Monaco
2	Balthazar Seydoux (b. 1971)	Priorité Monaco
3	Karen Aliprendi de Carvalho (b. 1986)	Priorité Monaco
4	Nathalie Amoratti-Blanc (b. 1964)	Priorité Monaco
5	José Badia (b. 1945)	Priorité Monaco
6	Pierre Bardy (b. 1987)	Priorité Monaco
7	Corinne Bertani (b. 1959)	Priorité Monaco
8	Daniel Boéri (b. 1944)	Priorité Monaco
9	Thomas Brezzo (b. 1979)	Priorité Monaco
10	Michèle Dittlot (b. 1949)	Priorité Monaco
11	Jean-Charles Emmerich (b. 1976)	Priorité Monaco
12	Marie-Noëlle Gibelli (b. 1957)	Priorité Monaco
13	Marine Grisoul (b. 1988)	Priorité Monaco
14	Franck Julien (b. 1964)	Priorité Monaco
15	Franck Lobono (b. 1968)	Priorité Monaco
16	Marc Mourou (b. 1986)	Priorité Monaco
17	Fabrice Notari (b. 1958)	Priorité Monaco
18	Christophe Robino (b. 1966)	Priorité Monaco
19	Guillaume Rose (b. 1969)	Priorité Monaco
20	Pierre Van Klaveren (b. 1985)	Priorité Monaco
21	Béatrice Fresko-Rolfo (b. 1969)	Horizon Monaco
22	Jacques Rit (b. 1949)	Horizon Monaco
23	Jean-Louis Grinda (b. 1960)	Union Monégasque
