= Recognition of same-sex unions in Monaco =

Monaco has recognised same-sex cohabitation agreements since 27 June 2020. On 4 December 2019, the National Council passed a bill 22–0 establishing cohabitation agreements offering both same-sex and opposite-sex couples limited legal rights and benefits in the areas of inheritance and property. The bill was signed into law by Prince Albert II on 17 December, and took effect on 27 June.

In March 2022, a court ordered the government to recognize a same-sex marriage validly performed in the United States. This ruling was upheld by the Court of Appeal, but the decision was overturned by the Court of Revision on 18 March 2024.

== Cohabitation agreements ==
The legislative process leading to the recognition of same-sex couples started in the early 2010s. In November 2010, an interview mentioned that Jean-Charles Gardetto, a member of the National Council and lawyer, was preparing a draft bill intending to legally define cohabitation, either for different-sex or for same-sex couples. On 18 June 2013, the opposition Union Monégasque party submitted a bill to Parliament to establish gender-neutral cohabitation agreements. The bill was immediately sent to the Women and Family Rights Commission for consideration. In July 2015, the commission's president said that debate on the bill would begin in late 2015. Originally submitted as pacte de vie commune, the bill was amended to establish a "cohabitation agreement" (French: contrat de vie commune, pronounced [kɔ̃tʁa d(ə) vi kɔmyn]; Monégasque: cuntratu de vita cumüne, pronounced [kuŋˈtɾatu de ˈvita kuˈmyːne]). The bill's rapporteur, Jean-Louis Grinda, submitted his report on 7 September 2016. It noted that the Monegasque administration has recognised concubinage since 2008, and that the European Court of Human Rights (ECHR) considers non-recognition of same-sex relationships to be contrary to the European Convention on Human Rights as per its ruling in Oliari and Others v Italy. On 27 October 2016, the National Council unanimously approved a resolution mandating the Council of Government to draft a bill recognizing same-sex unions. On 27 April 2017, the Council responded positively to the proposal, and said it would introduce a draft law by April 2018 following the February 2018 elections.

The cohabitation agreement bill was introduced to the National Council on 16 April 2018. Under the bill, cohabiting same-sex and opposite-sex couples would be considered on par with siblings for inheritance tax, but not at the same level as married couples. The agreement, which is open to siblings and parents and children as well, also provides an enumerated set of property and social security rights, and reciprocal obligations. The agreement is signed in front of a notary and then deposited at a public registry. It provides some but not all of the rights of marriage. For example, a foreign partner is not eligible for Monegasque citizenship, and both partners cannot share the same surname. On 4 December 2019, the National Council approved the bill in a unanimous 22–0 vote.

4 December 2019 vote in the National Council
Party	Voted for	Voted against	Absent (Did not vote)
Priorité Monaco	19: Karen Aliprendi; Nathalie Amoratti-Blanc; José Badia; Pierre Bardy; Corinne Bertani; Brigitte Boccone-Pagès; Daniel Boéri; Michèle Dittlot; Jean-Charles Emmerich; Marie-Noëlle Gibelli; Marine Grisoul; Franck Julien; Franck Lobono; Marc Mourou; Fabrice Notari; Christophe Robino; Balthazar Seydoux; Stéphane Valeri; Pierre Van Klaveren	–	2: Thomas Brezzo; Guillaume Rose
Horizon Monaco	2: Béatrice Fresko-Rolfo; Jacques Rit	–	–
Union Monégasque	1: Jean-Louis Grinda	–	–
Total	22	0	2
Total	91.7%	0.0%	8.3%

The legislation was signed into law by Prince Albert II on 17 December 2019, published in the official journal on 27 December and took effect six months later (i.e. 27 June 2020). Several lawmakers criticized the "hypocritical" opposition of Catholic officials, notably Archbishop Bernard Barsi who had written to all deputies urging them to vote against the bill, noting that the law concerned solely civil matters and not religious ones. Many deputies called the law "long overdue", and President of the National Council Stéphane Valeri called it "great news for all couples".

== Civil unions ==
Laws regarding same-sex partnerships in Europe¹ Marriage Civil union Limited domestic recognition (cohabitation) Unrecognized Constitution limits marriage to opposite-sex couples ¹ May include recent laws or court decisions that have not yet entered into effect.

In October 2025, Councilwoman Béatrice Fresko-Rolfo said she would draft legislation allowing same-sex partners to adopt. Consequently, the government announced its intention to introduce civil unions (French: union civile, pronounced [ynjɔ̃ sivil]; Monégasque: üniun çivile, pronounced [yˈnjuŋ siˈviːle]) for same-sex couples. In June 2026, it announced that it had been working for several months to strengthen legal recognition for same-sex couples and to establish clearer rules on parentage for children born to same-sex parents. Minister of State Christophe Mirmand said, "This approach would see two distinct regimes coexist. On one side, a civil union specific to same-sex couples; on the other, marriage between people of different sexes. Both would offer similar rights while imposing similar duties, such as the moral and material direction of the family and shared life. This approach appears to us, at present, as the most relevant path to explore."

== Same-sex marriage ==
=== Background ===
Same-sex marriage is not recognized in Monaco. The Civil Code of Monaco does not explicitly ban same-sex marriages, but article 116 requires "the man" and "the woman" to be at least 18 years of age to marry. The Constitution of Monaco does not restrict marriage to opposite-sex couples. Mon'Arc en Ciel, an organisation campaigning for the legalisation of same-sex marriage in Monaco, was established in May 2024. In June 2024, the High Commissioner for the Protection of Rights, Liberties and for Mediation, Marina Ceyssac, published a government report recommending enhancing the rights of same-sex couples in accordance with European case law, but stopped short of calling for the legalization of same-sex marriage. Councilwoman Béatrice Fresko-Rolfo said that same month that she was "prepared to act" to introduce legislation recognizing foreign same-sex marriages.

On 10 March 2022, a lower court ruled that the government had to register the marriage of a dual Monegasque-American same-sex couple who had married in Michigan in August 2019. The couple had applied to register their marriage in Monaco in February 2020, but the civil registrar refused on the basis that the Civil Code did not recognize same-sex marriages and that their marriage "contravened the Monegasque public order". The lower court held that the marriage was legally valid and did not violate the Monegasque public order. It ordered the government to register the marriage and provide the couple with all the rights and benefits of marriage. An appellate court upheld the decision on 28 September 2023. However, the appeal decision was overturned by the highest court, the Court of Revision, on 18 March 2024.

=== Religious performance ===
In May 2015, the United Protestant Church of France, which has one parish in Monaco, voted to allow its pastors to bless same-sex marriages. The measure, which was passed by 94 votes to 3, also includes a freedom of conscience clause allowing pastors with objections to opt out. The Catholic Church opposes same-sex marriage and does not allow its priests to officiate at such marriages. In December 2023, the Holy See published Fiducia supplicans, a declaration allowing Catholic priests to bless couples who are not considered to be married according to church teaching, including the blessing of same-sex couples.

== Public opinion ==
According to a survey conducted in 2007 by the Union pour Monaco (UPM) party before the 2007 municipal elections, 51% of respondents (only native Monegasque inhabitants asked) agreed that living in a registered partnership should be accepted. Monegasques being a minority in Monaco, the survey is not representative of the entire public's opinion.

== See also ==
- LGBT rights in Monaco
- Recognition of same-sex unions in Europe
