= 2018 Monegasque general election =

← 2013	11 February 2018	2023 →
- All 24 seats in the National Council; 13 seats needed for a majority
Party	Leader	Vote %	Seats	+/–
Primo!	Stéphane Valeri	57.71	21	New
Horizon Monaco	Béatrice Fresko-Rolfo	26.10	2	−18
UM	Jean-François Robillon	16.19	1	−2
This lists parties that won seats. See the complete results below.
President of the National Council before	President of the National Council after
Christophe Steiner; New Majority	Stéphane Valeri; Primo!

General elections were held in Monaco on 11 February 2018. Since the General Election of 2013, the largest party, Horizon Monaco, split, which led to the formation of a new political party – Primo! Priorite Monaco. The latter won 58% of the vote, while the other parties, Horizon Monaco and Union Monégasque got 26% and 16% respectively. This led to a 21-seat gain for Primo!, with the 3 remaining seats being divided between Horizon Monaco and Union Monégasque.

== Electoral system ==
Voters can either choose a party list or choose candidates from various lists ("panachage") for the 24 seats. The 16 candidates with the most votes are elected (with the older candidate breaking possible ties in votes). The eight other seats are chosen from lists in accordance with the proportional representation system for parties that have at least five percent of votes.

== Results ==
70% of registered voters cast a vote.

Party	Votes	%	+/–	Seats	+/–
Priorité Monaco	63,806	57.71	New	21	New
Horizon Monaco	28,858	26.10	–24.24	2	–18
Union Monégasque	17,895	16.19	–22.80	1	–2
Total	110,559	100.00	–	24	0
Valid votes	4,814	94.60			
Invalid votes	175	3.44			
Blank votes	100	1.97			
Total votes	5,089	100.00			
Registered voters/turnout	7,245	70.24			
Source: Journal de Monaco

=== By candidate ===
Party	Candidates	Votes	Total party votes	%	Seats
Priorité Monaco	Stéphane Valeri	2,937	63,806	57.7	21
Priorité Monaco	Christophe Robino	2,789	63,806	57.7	21
Priorité Monaco	Marc Mourou	2,771	63,806	57.7	21
Priorité Monaco	Nathalie Amoratti Blanc	2,752	63,806	57.7	21
Priorité Monaco	Thomas Brezzo	2,734	63,806	57.7	21
Priorité Monaco	Fabrice Notari	2,719	63,806	57.7	21
Priorité Monaco	Pierre Van Klaveren	2,709	63,806	57.7	21
Priorité Monaco	Guillaume Rose	2,706	63,806	57.7	21
Priorité Monaco	Michèle Dittlot	2,695	63,806	57.7	21
Priorité Monaco	Corinne Bertani	2,687	63,806	57.7	21
Priorité Monaco	José Badia	2,668	63,806	57.7	21
Priorité Monaco	Franck Julien	2,668	63,806	57.7	21
Priorité Monaco	Pierre Bardy	2,665	63,806	57.7	21
Priorité Monaco	Marine Grisoul	2,647	63,806	57.7	21
Priorité Monaco	Balthazar Seydoux Fornier de Clausonne	2,645	63,806	57.7	21
Priorité Monaco	Jean-Charles Emmerich	2,641	63,806	57.7	21
Priorité Monaco	Franck Lobono	2,629	63,806	57.7	21
Priorité Monaco	Marie-Noëlle Gibelli	2,591	63,806	57.7	21
Priorité Monaco	Daniel Boeri	2,574	63,806	57.7	21
Priorité Monaco	Brigitte Boccone Pages	2,568	63,806	57.7	21
Priorité Monaco	Karen Aliprendi	2,529	63,806	57.7	21
Priorité Monaco	Roland Mouflard	2,523	63,806	57.7	21
Priorité Monaco	Laurence Aubert	2,514	63,806	57.7	21
Priorité Monaco	Patrick Rinaldi	2,445	63,806	57.7	21
Horizon Monaco	Béatrice Fresko-Rolfo	1,472	28,858	26.1	2
Horizon Monaco	Jacques Rit	1,363	28,858	26.1	2
Horizon Monaco	Christophe Spiliotis-Saquet	1,305	28,858	26.1	2
Horizon Monaco	Claude Boisson	1,282	28,858	26.1	2
Horizon Monaco	Bertrand Crovetto	1,267	28,858	26.1	2
Horizon Monaco	Jean-François Riehl	1,255	28,858	26.1	2
Horizon Monaco	Morgane Jade Aureglia	1,232	28,858	26.1	2
Horizon Monaco	Christian Barilaro	1,219	28,858	26.1	2
Horizon Monaco	Henri Riey	1,217	28,858	26.1	2
Horizon Monaco	Criss Roux	1,213	28,858	26.1	2
Horizon Monaco	Jean-Christophe Pages	1,212	28,858	26.1	2
Horizon Monaco	Mathilde Bellon Le Clerc	1,207	28,858	26.1	2
Horizon Monaco	Robert Boisbouvier	1,207	28,858	26.1	2
Horizon Monaco	Elodie Kern de Millo Terrazzani	1,183	28,858	26.1	2
Horizon Monaco	Véronique Prat	1,168	28,858	26.1	2
Horizon Monaco	Katia Gagnol	1,160	28,858	26.1	2
Horizon Monaco	Séverine Druenne	1,159	28,858	26.1	2
Horizon Monaco	Catherine Chailan Grover	1,144	28,858	26.1	2
Horizon Monaco	Cyril Durand	1,143	28,858	26.1	2
Horizon Monaco	Jean-Michel Rapaire	1,131	28,858	26.1	2
Horizon Monaco	Georges Dick	1,120	28,858	26.1	2
Horizon Monaco	Valérie Laugier	1,098	28,858	26.1	2
Horizon Monaco	Odile Frolla	1,052	28,858	26.1	2
Horizon Monaco	Maria Dolorès Villalonga Otto-Bruc	1,049	28,858	26.1	2
Union Monégasque	Jean-Louis Grinda	1,076	17,895	16.2	1
Union Monégasque	Jean-François Robillon	1,051	17,895	16.2	1
Union Monégasque	Bernard Pasquier	961	17,895	16.2	1
Union Monégasque	Jean-Charles Allavena	881	17,895	16.2	1
Union Monégasque	Valérie Bernard	817	17,895	16.2	1
Union Monégasque	Eric Elena	810	17,895	16.2	1
Union Monégasque	Jean Billon	781	17,895	16.2	1
Union Monégasque	Claude Rosticher	765	17,895	16.2	1
Union Monégasque	Anabela Crovetto	738	17,895	16.2	1
Union Monégasque	Christophe Brico	737	17,895	16.2	1
Union Monégasque	Alfonso Ciulla	733	17,895	16.2	1
Union Monégasque	Christian Palmaro	706	17,895	16.2	1
Union Monégasque	Guillaume Galtier	681	17,895	16.2	1
Union Monégasque	Hugh Fissore	675	17,895	16.2	1
Union Monégasque	Allison Billaud	679	17,895	16.2	1
Union Monégasque	Audrey Bovini Le Joliff	660	17,895	16.2	1
Union Monégasque	Gabriel Grinda	660	17,895	16.2	1
Union Monégasque	Bruno Billaud	651	17,895	16.2	1
Union Monégasque	Martine Eva Rosticher	651	17,895	16.2	1
Union Monégasque	Annabelle Pinon	649	17,895	16.2	1
Union Monégasque	Stéphane Tomatis Moro	646	17,895	16.2	1
Union Monégasque	Valérie Pesci	644	17,895	16.2	1
Union Monégasque	Eric Battaglia	623	17,895	16.2	1
Union Monégasque	Etienne Ruzic	620	17,895	16.2	1
Source: Journal de Monaco
