= 2023 Monegasque general election =

- 5 February 2023

All 24 seats in the National Council 13 seats needed for a majority
- Turnout: 57.26% (▼13.09pp)
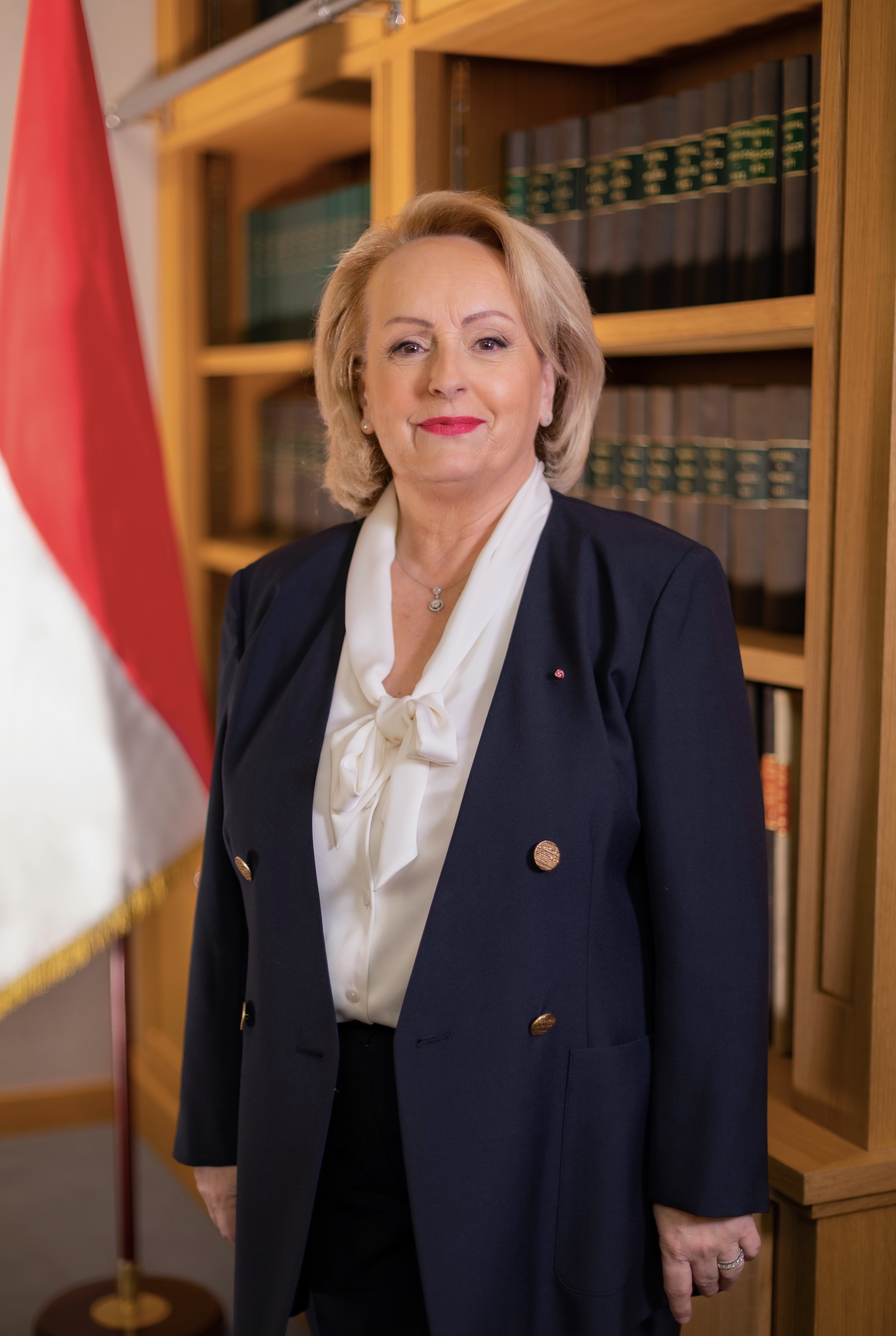
	First party	Second party
		Hor
Leader	Brigitte Boccone-Pagès	Laurent Nouvion
Party	Priorité Monaco	Horizon Monaco
Alliance	UNM	UNM
Last election	21	2
Seats won	13	8
Seat change	▼8	▲6
Percentage	89.63% (Note: Elected on the UNM list)	89.63% (Note: Elected on the UNM list)
	Third party	Fourth party
	UMU
Leader	Jean-François Robillon	Daniel Boéri
Party	UM	NIM
Alliance	UNM
Last election	1	Did not exist
Seats won	3	0
Seat change	▲2	Steady
Percentage	89.63% (Note: Elected on the UNM list)	10.37%
President of the National Council before election
Brigitte Boccone-Pagès
Primo! (UNM)
Elected President of the National Council
Brigitte Boccone-Pagès
Primo! (UNM)

General elections were held in Monaco on 5 February 2023. The result was a landslide victory for the governing Monegasque National Union led by Brigitte Boccone-Pagès, which won all 24 seats on the National Council. The new council was sworn in on 16 February.

== Background ==
The previous elections in February 2018 saw Stéphane Valeri's Priorité Monaco list win 21 of the 24 seats with more than 57% of the vote, with the party taking all seats filled by majority vote and five of the eight filled by proportional representation. Second- and third-placed Horizon Monaco and the Union Monégasque won two and one seats respectively.

Valeri announced his retirement from political life in September 2022. He was succeeded by the vice-president of the National Council, Brigitte Boccone-Pagès, who became the first woman to take the presidency of the National Council. A month later, she announced the merger of Priorité Monaco, Horizon Monaco and the Union Monégasque into the Monegasque National Union (UNM).

Deputy Daniel Boéri, who had left Priorité Monaco in July 2022, became the only opposition MP after the formation of the UNM. He subsequently founded New Ideas for Monaco on 26 October 2022. It campaigned on the themes of ecology and starting a public debate on the legalisation of abortion.

== Electoral system ==
Voters can either choose a party list or choose candidates from various lists (panachage) for the 24 seats. The 16 candidates with the most votes are elected (with the older candidate breaking possible ties in votes). The eight other seats are chosen from lists in accordance with the proportional representation system for parties that have at least five per cent of votes.

== Contesting parties ==
Name		Ideology	Position	Leader(s)	Last election		Before election
Name		Ideology	Position	Leader(s)	%	Seats	Before election
UNM	Monegasque National Union; Union Nationale Monégasque	Conservatism	Right-wing	Brigitte Boccone-Pagès	100% (Note: All three parties that contested the 2018 elections – Priorité Monaco, Horizon Monaco and Union Monégasque – allied to form the Monegasque National Union.)	24 / 24	23 / 24
NIM	New Ideas for Monaco; Nouvelles Idées pour Monaco	Environmentalism	Centre-left	Daniel Boéri	Did not exist		1 / 24

== Results ==
Party	Votes	%	Seats	+/–
Monegasque National Union	72,602	89.63	24	0
New Ideas for Monaco	8,401	10.37	0	New
Total	81,003	100.00	24	0
Valid votes	3,948	90.80		
Invalid votes	254	5.84		
Blank votes	146	3.36		
Total votes	4,348	100.00		
Registered voters/turnout	7,594	57.26		
Source: Journal de Monaco, Mairie de Monaco

=== By candidate ===
List	Candidates	Votes	Total votes	%	Seats
Monegasque National Union	Nathalie Amoratti-Blanc	3,164	72,602	89.63	24
Monegasque National Union	Balthazar Seydoux	3,131	72,602	89.63	24
Monegasque National Union	Christine Pasquier-Ciulla	3,122	72,602	89.63	24
Monegasque National Union	Régis Bergonzi	3,116	72,602	89.63	24
Monegasque National Union	Jean-Louis Grinda	3,116	72,602	89.63	24
Monegasque National Union	Fabrice Notari	3,116	72,602	89.63	24
Monegasque National Union	Franck Julien	3,105	72,602	89.63	24
Monegasque National Union	Mathilde Le Clerc	3,086	72,602	89.63	24
Monegasque National Union	Béatrice Fresko-Rolfo	3,077	72,602	89.63	24
Monegasque National Union	Morgane Jade Aureglia	3,064	72,602	89.63	24
Monegasque National Union	Nicolas Croesi	3,045	72,602	89.63	24
Monegasque National Union	Corinne Bertani	3,037	72,602	89.63	24
Monegasque National Union	Franck Lobono	3,019	72,602	89.63	24
Monegasque National Union	Thomas Brezzo	3,016	72,602	89.63	24
Monegasque National Union	Brigitte Boccone-Pagès	3,002	72,602	89.63	24
Monegasque National Union	Christophe Brico	2,996	72,602	89.63	24
Monegasque National Union	Marie-Noëlle Gibelli	2,975	72,602	89.63	24
Monegasque National Union	Marine Grisoul	2,949	72,602	89.63	24
Monegasque National Union	Maryse Battaglia	2,931	72,602	89.63	24
Monegasque National Union	Karen Aliprendi	2,928	72,602	89.63	24
Monegasque National Union	Roland Mouflard	2,927	72,602	89.63	24
Monegasque National Union	Mikaël Palmaro	2,917	72,602	89.63	24
Monegasque National Union	Guillaume Rose	2,903	72,602	89.63	24
Monegasque National Union	Philippe Brunner	2,860	72,602	89.63	24
New Ideas for Monaco	Jean-Charles Tonelli	770	8,401	10.37	0
New Ideas for Monaco	Daniel Boéri	731	8,401	10.37	0
New Ideas for Monaco	Juliette Rapaire	706	8,401	10.37	0
New Ideas for Monaco	Jean-Michel Rapaire	664	8,401	10.37	0
New Ideas for Monaco	Valérie Laugier	601	8,401	10.37	0
New Ideas for Monaco	Sébastien Lambla	594	8,401	10.37	0
New Ideas for Monaco	Jean L'Herbon de Lussats	568	8,401	10.37	0
New Ideas for Monaco	Ana Crovetto	560	8,401	10.37	0
New Ideas for Monaco	Pierre Dick	552	8,401	10.37	0
New Ideas for Monaco	Gaylord Crovetto	550	8,401	10.37	0
New Ideas for Monaco	Eric Battaglia	542	8,401	10.37	0
New Ideas for Monaco	Jean Charles Grassi	540	8,401	10.37	0
New Ideas for Monaco	Marc Giacone	517	8,401	10.37	0
New Ideas for Monaco	Hanny Leuenberger	506	8,401	10.37	0
Source:Journal de Monaco, Mairie de Monaco

=== Analysis ===
The elections were won by the Monegasque National Union, which received nearly 90% of the votes and won all 24 seats on the council. It was the largest landslide victory since that of the National and Democratic Union in 1988, before the formation of the other centre-right party National Progressive Action in 1993. The outgoing president of the National Council, Brigitte Boccone-Pagès's mandate, is thus largely renewed. The merger of the parties elected in 2018 into the UNM led to a relative lack of interest among voters for the ballot. With 749 fewer voters than five years earlier despite an increase in the number of voters registered on the lists of 349, voter turnout showed a drop of 13 points, dropping from 70.35% to 57.26%.
