= Politics of Monaco =

The politics of Monaco take place within the framework of a semi-constitutional monarchy, with the Prince of Monaco as head of state, with some powers devolved to several advisory and legislative bodies.

== Constitution ==
Historically, the princes of the ruling House of Grimaldi were autocrats of an absolute monarchy until the first Constitution of Monaco was adopted in 1911. A second constitution was granted by Prince Rainier III on December 17, 1962, outlining legislative, judicial, and executive branches of government, which consist of several administrative offices and a number of councils. The Prince as head of state retains most of the country's governing power; however, the principality's judicial and legislative bodies may operate independently of his control.

== Government of Monaco ==
=== Executive branch ===
Sovereign Prince Term start (Term length)	Minister of State Term start (Term length)
Albert II; 6 April 2005 (21 years, 180 days)	Christophe Mirmand; 21 July 2025 (1 year, 74 days)

The Council of Government is under the authority of the prince. The title and position of prince is hereditary, the minister of state was appointed by the monarch from a list of three French or Monegasque national candidates presented by the French government, but is now chosen by the monarch. Until the 2002 amendment to the Monegasque constitution, only French nationals were eligible for the post. The prince is advised by the Crown Council of Monaco.

=== Legislative branch ===
President Party Term start (Term length)	Vice President Party Term start (Term length)
Thomas Brezzo Priorité Monaco 3 April 2024 (2 years, 183 days)	Jean-Louis Grinda Monegasque National Union 16 February 2023 (3 years, 229 days)
National Council

The unicameral National Council (Conseil National) has 24 seats. The members are elected by popular vote to serve five-year terms. The Council can be disbanded by the Prince of Monaco provided that he hosts elections within 3 months. Uniquely, Monegasque legislators can be members of multiple political parties. Currently the administrative coalition, Monegasque National Union, holds all 24 seats after winning nearly 90% of the vote in the 2023 general election. The coalition consists of the three largest parties in Monaco: Priorité Monaco (centre-right), which won 21 seats in the 2018 general election; Horizon Monaco (right-wing) which won 2 seats in 2018; and Union Monégasque, (centre), which won 1 seat in 2018. The centre-left coalition, New Ideas for Monaco, holds no seats after running candidates in just 13 seats and winning only 10% of the vote.

=== Judicial branch ===
The supreme courts are the Judicial Court of Revision (Cour de révision judiciaire), which hears civil and criminal cases (as well as some administrative cases), and the Supreme tribunal (tribunal suprême), which performs judicial review. Both courts are staffed by French judges (appointed among judges of French courts, members of the Conseil d'État and university professors).

=== Political parties and elections ===
Party	Votes	%	Seats	+/–
Monegasque National Union	72,602	89.63	24	+1
New Ideas for Monaco	8,401	10.37	0	–1
Invalid/blank votes	400	–	–	–
Total	81,403	100	24	0
Registered voters/turnout	7,594	57.26	–	–
Source: Mairie de Monaco

=== Political spectrum ===
Monegasque tend to be more conservative due to their alignment with the Catholic Church. There are no official left-wing parties although Union Monégasque is considered the "most liberal" of the three main parties that formed the Monegasque National Union. A new centre-left party, New Ideas for Monaco, was formed in 2022.

== Administrative divisions ==
There are no first-order administrative divisions in the principality, which is instead traditionally divided into four quarters (French: quartiers, singular quartier): Fontvieille, La Condamine, Monaco-Ville and Monte-Carlo, with the suburb Moneghetti (part of La Condamine) colloquially seen as an unofficial, fifth quarter. They have a joint Communal Council of Monaco.

The principality is, for administrative and official purposes, currently divided into ten wards:

- Monaco-Ville
- Monte Carlo/Spélugues
- Fontvieille
- Moneghetti/Bd de Belgique
- La Condamine
- Larvotto/Bas Moulins
- La Rousse/Saint Roman
- Jardin Exotique
- Ravin de Sainte-Dévote

== International organization participation ==
ACCT, ECE, International Atomic Energy Agency, International Civil Aviation Organization, ICRM, IFRCS, IHO, IMO, Inmarsat, Intelsat, Interpol, International Olympic Committee, ITU, OPCW, OSCE, United Nations, UNCTAD, UNESCO, Universal Postal Union, World Health Organization, World Intellectual Property Organization, World Meteorological Organization, Council of Europe.
