= Cédric Biscay =

French entrepreneur and author

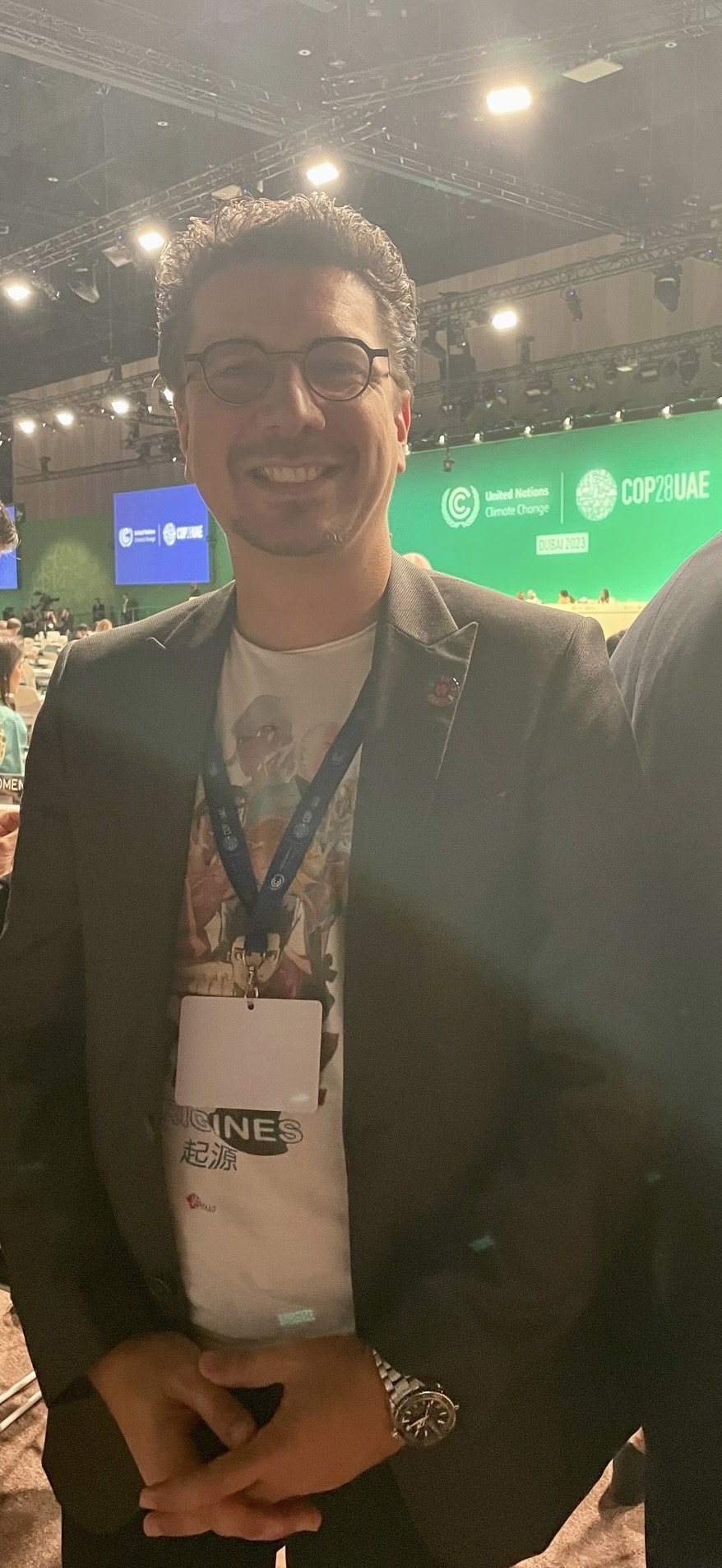
- Born: 1979 (age 46–47); Nice, France
- Occupations: President and CEO, Shibuya Productions

Cédric Biscay is a French entrepreneur, producer and author. He founded consultancy Shibuya International in 2002 and co-founded Monégasque company Shibuya Productions in 2014. The Monaco Anime Game International Conferences (MAGIC) event began at Shibuya Productions.

== Biography ==
Biscay was born in Nice in 1979. He began traveling to Tokyo in 1997. In 2002, Biscay established Shibuya International, a company named after Shibuya, Tokyo that facilitates business between France and Japan. In 2014, he and businessman Kostadin Yanev founded Shibuya Productions, a publishing company in Monaco. The company was worked on Shenmue III and an Astro Boy Reboot in 2015. The Monaco Anime Game International Conferences (MAGIC) event began as a gala dinner celebrating the launch of Shibuya Productions. It became an annual event held at Grimaldi Forum in the late 2010s. Another MAGIC event was held in Kyoto from 2018.

Biscay created chess manga series Blitz, with advice from Garry Kasparov, which was released in February 2020. In April, Shibuya Productions released Swap Tales: Leon!, a video game available in the Monégasque dialect. In 2021, Activbody's Activ5 sports practice device is marketed by Shibuya Productions. Due to Covid-19, the MAGIC event was not held from 2020 to 2022, but returned in 2023. In 2024, the 7th MAGIC event did not take place. Monaco Hebdo reported due to Shibuya being in suspension of payment. That year Biscay also became an organiser of the Comic Con in Monaco. In 2025, he was appointed by H.S.H. Prince Albert II as Special Advisor for the Expo 2025. In 2022, Shibuya Productions began producing on Astro Boy Reboot, an animated television series co-produced with Method Animation and Tezuka Productions. The series was scheduled for delivery to TF1 in France and ZDF in Germany.

=== Honors and reception ===
On 22 June 2021, Cédric Biscay received the Certificate of Commendation from the Minister for Foreign Affairs (Japan), an honour awarded by Minister Taro Kono. The distinction was presented to him by His Excellency Ihara Junichi, Ambassador of Japan, in the presence of H.S.H. Prince Albert II of Monaco. On 17 November 2022, Cédric Biscay was appointed Knight of the Order of Saint-Charles by H.S.H. Prince Albert II of Monaco. It is the highest honorary distinction of the Principality of Monaco, awarded by the Sovereign Prince to recognise merit and services rendered to the State or to his person. Biscay received the Eco Trophy from the Monaco Economic Board (MEB) in 2023 and is an ambassador of the Committee for the Promotion and Protection of Women’s Rights, established by sovereign order of Monaco.

According to Monaco Life, Biscay has been involved in initiatives related to cultural exchange between Monaco and Japan, described in the context of cultural diplomacy and soft power. These activities have included participation in efforts linked to official cultural relations, including events associated with visits by members of the Japanese imperial family such as Princess Akiko of Mikasa.

== Works ==
Year	Title	Role	Ref.
2004	Blue Angelo: Angels from the Shrine	Producer	
2012	Birth	Producer	
2012	Windwalkers	Producer	
2014	Petz Club	Producer	
2015	Lilly and the Magic Pearl	Producer	
2017	Sad Hill Unearthed	Associate producer	
2019	Shenmue III	Co-producer	
2020	Twin Mirror	Co-producer	
2020	Blitz	Author	
