= François Feuardent =

French Franciscan theologian and preacher of the Ligue

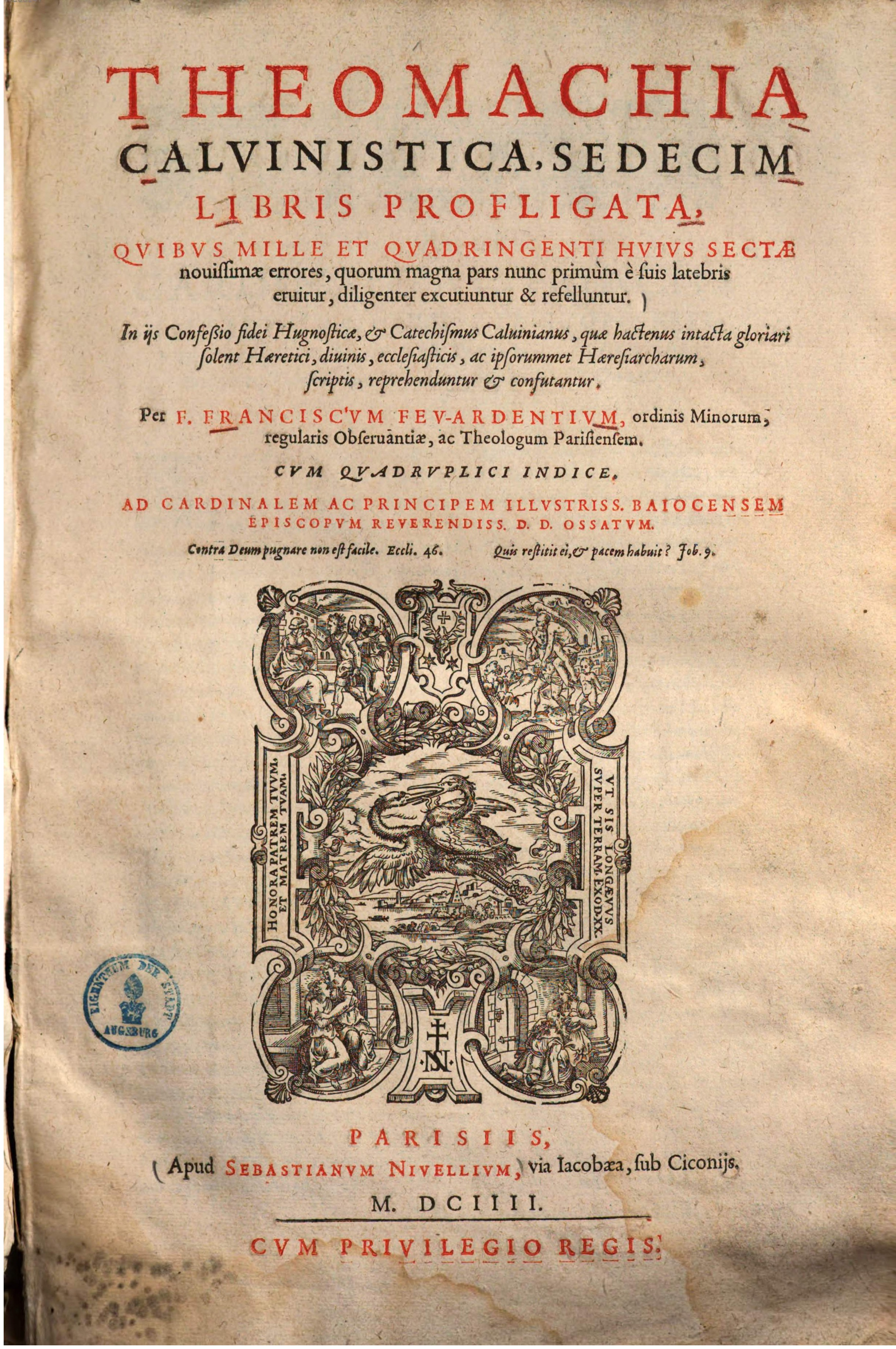
Title page of François Föarden's book "Theomachia Calvinistica"

François Feuardent (1539 – 1 January 1610) was a French Franciscan theologian, and preacher of the Ligue.

== Life ==
Feuardent was born at Coutances, Normandy. Having studied humanities at Bayeux, he joined the Friars Minor. After the novitiate, he was sent to Paris to continue his studies, where he received (1576) the degree of Doctor in Theology and taught at the university.

He took a leading part in the political and religious troubles in which France was involved at that time. With Jean Boucher and Guillaume Rose, bishop of Senlis, he was one of the foremost preachers in the cause of the Catholic Ligue. As Roennus remarks in an appendix to Feuardent's "Theomachia", there was not a church in Paris in which he had not preached. Throughout France and beyond the frontiers in Lorraine and Flanders, he was a defender of the Catholic faith. Pierre de l'Etoile, a fierce adversary of the Ligue, recognises in his "Mémoires" Feuardent's subsequent efforts in pacifying the country.

In his old age he retired to the convent of Bayeux, which he restored and furnished with a good library. He died in Paris.

== Works ==
His works can be grouped in three classes: (1) Scriptural; (2) patristical; (3) controversial. They included:

(1) A new edition of the medieval Scripturist, Nicholas of Lyra: "Biblia Sacra, cum glossa ordinaria ... et postillâ Nicolai Lyrani" (Paris, 1590), 6 vols. fol.). He also wrote commentaries on various books of Holy Scripture, viz on Ruth Esther, Job, Jonas, the two Epistles of St. Peter, the Epistles of St. Jude and St. James, the Epistle of St. Paul to Philemon, and others.

(2) "S. Irenaei Lugd. episcopi adversus Valentini . . . haereses libri quinque" (Paris, 1576); "S. Ildephonsi archiepiscopi Toletani de virginitate Mariae liber" (Paris, 1576). Feuardent also wrote an introduction and notes to "Michaelis Pselli Dialogus de energiâ seu operatione daemonum translatus a Petro Morrello" (Paris, 1577).

(3) "Appendix ad libros Alphonsi a Castro (O.F.M.) contra haereses" (Paris, 1578). "Theomachia Calvinistica", his chief work, is based on some earlier writings, such as: "Semaine premiere des dialogues auxquels sont examinees et refutees 174 erreurs des Calvinistes" (1585); "Seconde semaine des dialogues ..." (Paris, 1598); "Entremangeries et guerres mininstrales ..." (Caen, 1601).
