= Marc Giacone =

Monégasque composer and organist

- Born: 1954 (age 71–72); Monaco
- Occupations: Organist; composer
- Musical career
- Genre: Classical

Marc Giacone is a Monégasque composer, organist, electroacoustic researcher and improviser.

Born in 1954 in Monaco, he studied the pipe organ with Émile Bourdon, Canon Henri Carol, and Jean Wallet; musical improvisation with Pierre Cochereau; and musical composition (harmony, counterpoint, orchestration).

Giacone composes for organ, harp, piano, flute, trombone, vibraphone, synthesizer. He also composes orchestral works and works for cinema, television, and radio. His work draws on a range of musical styles, for example, jazz, fusion, folk, atonality, dodecaphony and sound effects. He teaches articulation, traditional organ, improvisation and musical theory.

In 2005, Giacone was named titular organist of the Cavaillé-Coll organ at the Chapelle des Pères Carmes in Monte-Carlo.

Giacone created satirical website Monaco Politic Circus which featured cartoons allegedly defaming Monaco's Prince Albert II.

== Discography - Organ works ==
- Symphonie Cosmique (Vol.1 – KRM0001)
- Ombres & Lumières
- Tsunami
- Prospective 2005
- Music of Today (Calcante – CAL CD045)
