= Pierre Bardy =

Pierre Bardy may refer to:

- Pierre Bardy (politician) (born 1987), Monegasque politician
- Pierre Bardy (footballer) (born 1992), French footballer
