= New Ideas for Monaco =

Political party in Monaco

New Ideas for Monaco Nouvelles Idées pour Monaco
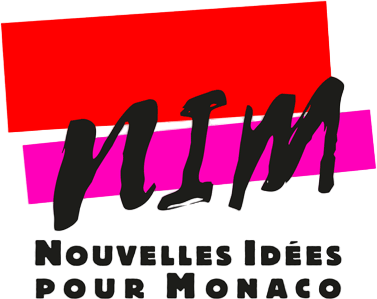
- Abbreviation: NIM
- Leader: Daniel Boéri
- Founder: Daniel Boéri
- Founded: 26 October 2022
- Registered: 16 January 2023
- Split from: Priorité Monaco
- Ideology: Environmentalism
- Political position: Centre-left
- Colours: Red; Magenta
- Slogan: "Monegasque non-inscrits"; (French: «Non-inscrits monégasques»)
- National Council: 0 / 24

New Ideas for Monaco (French: Nouvelles Idées pour Monaco, NIM) is a Monegasque association and political list. It ran in the 2023 election, led by councilor Daniel Boéri, but did not win any seats.

== History ==
In July 2022, Daniel Boéri left the Priorité Monaco party.

On 26 October 2022, it became known that the NIM association was preparing its list for participation in the 2023 elections, which would oppose the ruling Monegasque National Union.

On 16 January 2023, the list presented its 13 candidates for the 2023 election. It failed to elect a single member, and the ruling Monegasque National Union won every seat in the National Council.

== Ideology ==
Environmental, social and democratic issues in Monaco are central to the organization. Among the association's campaign promises was to launch a debate on abortion in Monaco, which as of 2023 still remained illegal.

== Electoral history ==
=== National Council elections ===
| Election | Party leader | Votes | % | Seats | +/− | Position |
|---|---|---|---|---|---|---|
| 2023 | Daniel Boéri | 8,401 | 10.4 | 0 / 24 | New | 2nd |

Sources: Journal de Monaco, Mairie de Monaco
