= Twin Mirror =

2020 video game

- Developers: Dontnod Entertainment; Shibuya Productions
- Publisher: Dontnod Entertainment (Note: Bandai Namco Entertainment digitally distributed the PlayStation 4 and Xbox One versions.)
- Director: Florian Desforges
- Producers: Jérémie Poidevin, Cédric Biscay
- Designer: Ludovic Rouvière
- Programmer: Francois Karr
- Artists: Pierre-Etienne Travers; Andrew Desmond
- Writers: Hélène Henry; Matthew Ritter
- Composer: David Wingo
- Engine: Unreal Engine 4
- Platforms: PlayStation 4; Windows; Xbox One
- Release: 1 December 2020
- Genre: Adventure
- Mode: Single-player

Twin Mirror is a 2020 adventure game by Dontnod Entertainment. Co-produced with Shibuya Productions, the game was released for PlayStation 4, Windows, and Xbox One on 1 December 2020. It received mixed reviews from critics.

== Gameplay ==
Twin Mirror's use of the Mind Palace mechanic. Sam investigate an MP version of Coal Miner's Haven Bar to find out who he was with last night.

Twin Mirror is an adventure game played from a third-person view. Players control the investigative journalist Sam, who has returned to his hometown of Basswood, West Virginia. The environment is interactive and its objects are obtainable. Whom Sam speaks to is optional and, based on the state of his investigation, there are multiple endings to unlock.

Players navigate between the real world and Sam's "Mind Palace" to discover clues. Sam's inner voice, the Double, may aid or harm the investigation.

== Plot ==
Samuel "Sam" Higgs, a former investigative journalist, returns to Basswood, West Virginia in light of his close friend Nick's death. He originally left Basswood following publication of his article about safety violations at the town's coal mines. The mines closed in the aftermath, ultimately he is leaving hundreds without jobs and angered townsfolk who despised Sam. During his stay in the town, Nick's daughter, Joan, asks him to check on the events leading up to Nick's death as she finds his activity before he died suspicious. Sam teams up with Anna, his ex-girlfriend who knew Nick well as they worked together at the newspaper Basswood Jungle, in hope that by following leads and investigating clues may lead to finding the source of Nick's death.

== Development and Release ==
Partnering with publisher Bandai Namco Entertainment Europe, Dontnod Entertainment began developing Twin Mirror in 2016 with a separate team of senior developers. About forty people were working on it as of September 2018. Lead writer Matthew Ritter was influenced by adventure games like Beneath a Steel Sky and Space Quest.

Twin Mirror was announced in June 2018 during E3 2018, and was scheduled to release for PlayStation 4, Windows, and Xbox One the following year. In August at Gamescom, it was revealed to be an episodic title releasing in 2019, with Lost on Arrival as the first of three episodes.

Contrary to previous titles, Dontnod desired to have Twin Mirror be void of any supernatural elements. According to art director Pierre-Etienne Travers, the game's primary concept is duality. The decision to set it in a fictional American town, based on southern West Virginia, was to broaden its appeal.

In June 2019, Dontnod announced they would self-publish the game, with Bandai Namco Entertainment acting as the distributor for the console versions. Shibuya Productions would also handle production duties for the game. Bandai Namco decided to cancel the Japanese console versions of Twin Mirror shortly after Dontnod acquired the IP rights from Bandai.

The game was originally designed as an episodic game when it was first revealed. Following the delay, the game was reworked and the episodic format was abandoned so it can be played without any interruptions.

At the PC Gaming Show 2020 in June, a teaser trailer was shown. In September 2020, it was announced that it would release on 1 December 2020. The PC version was exclusive to the Epic Games Store for one year.

== Reception ==
Reception

Aggregate score
Aggregator	Score
Metacritic	(PC) 65/100 (PS4) 60/100 (XONE) 62/100

Review scores
Publication	Score
4Players	75%
Easy Allies	6.0/10
Eurogamer	Avoid
GameSpot	7/10
IGN	5/10
Jeuxvideo.com	13/20
PC Gamer (US)	52/100
PCGamesN	7/10
The Guardian	4/5

Twin Mirror received "mixed or average" reviews from critics, according to review aggregator website Metacritic.

Some reviewers criticised the game's gameplay mechanics and felt that the protagonist lacked personality. They noted it was too short. GameReactor praised the visuals.

=== Sales ===
In February 2022, Dontnod said it recouped 75% of the game's production cost and believed to only receive marginal revenue from it in the future.
