= Federation of Monegasque Enterprises =

Business association in Monaco

Federation of Monégasque Enterprises (French: Fédération des Entreprises Monégasques, FEDEM) is an interprofessional body which has defended the rights and interests of Monégasque companies for more than 70 years. As a non-profit interprofessional organization, FEDEM studies economic, industrial, commercial, social issues affecting Monaco and of interest to its members. It is empowered to discuss and negotiate all the amendments to the National Collective Labor Agreement, and to bring social dialogue to life. It can also influence the government policy by giving opinions and making constructive remarks to the bills and proposals of law. FEDEM also cooperates with the Monégasque government and the Monaco Economic Board in organization of digital workshops on different current issues. FEDEM publishes its magazine Monaco Business News, covering current business topics in Monaco.

== History ==
FEDEM was established in 1945 under the name of Fédération Patronale Monégasque (Monégasque Employers' Federation, FPM). For 75 years, it has supported the development of Monégasque companies and the country's economic development. In 2014, the Monégasque Employers' Federation changed its name to Fédération des entreprises monégasques to keep up with the current business environment.

Since 2008, the president of the FEDEM is Philippe Ortelli.

== Services ==
The FEDEM provides a set of services to its members such as pre-litigation legal assistance in Monégasque social law, privileged access to its quarterly Monaco Business News, privileged access to professional training programs in IT/office automation, management/human resources/communication, and other as well as administrative and accounting service for the affiliated professional unions.

== Response to Covid-19 Crisis ==
In May 2020, FEDEM filed a request for annulment of the law from 11 May 2020 governing dismissals during the health crisis, before the Supreme Court of the Principality. The president of FEDEM, Philippe Ortelli, criticized the Monégasque executives for having added safeguards to the flexibility measures, in particular the clause prohibiting dismissals in the companies concerned. On 2 December 2020 the Supreme Court rejected the FEDEM's appeal.
