= Petz Club =

- Also known as: Petz Club, SOS animaux disparus
- Genre: Adventure; Educational; Mystery
- Created by: Dominique Amouyal; Hadrien Soulez Larivière
- Developed by: Olivier Dehors
- Written by: Dominique Amouyal; Hadrien Soulez Larivière; Régis Vidal
- Directed by: Régis Vidal; Florian Thouret
- Voices of: Fily Keita; Pascal Novak; Brigitte Lecordier; Alexandre Nguyen
- Countries of origin: France; Monaco
- Original language: French
- No. of seasons: 1
- No. of episodes: 52

Production
- Executive producers: Gilbert Hus; Charles Malka
- Producer: Cédric Biscay
- Running time: 13 minutes
- Production companies: Pictor Média; Shibuya Productions

Original release
- Network: France 5
- Release: June 30, 2014

Petz Club (fully known as Petz Club, SOS animaux disparus) is a French/Monegasque animated children's television series created by Dominique Amouyal and Hadrien Soulez Larivière. The series debuted on France 5's Zouzous block on June 30, 2014.

== Plot ==
Petz Club is about a group of three young kids and their dog who find lost pets.

== Characters ==
- Nina is an 8-year-old who created the Petz Club.
- Oscar is a 7 1/2-year-old, and is the detective of the group.
- Tim is a 7-year-old, and is the sportiest of the group.
- Marlou is the Petz Club's dog.
- Gilou is a vet who helps the Petz Club with their investigations.

== Episodes ==
note: This table is incomplete and only contains the names for episodes 1-2, 6-9, 12-16, 19-20, 23, 25-29, 36-37, 40-44, 46-48 and 50-51. The titles for episodes 3-5, 10-11, 17-18, 21-22, 24, 30-35, 38-39, 45, 49 and 52 are missing.

No.	Title	Directed by	Written by	Original release date
1	"My Frenemy" "Ma Meilleure Enemie"	TBA	TBA	TBA
A classroom hamster disappears, and its current caretaker suspects her frenemy
2	"It's Magical" "C'est Magique"	TBA	TBA	TBA
A little girl amateur magician Astrid Chesterfield loses her bird.
6	"A Dear Friend" "Un ami tres cher"	TBA	Franck Soullard	TBA
A shar-pei has been dognapped
7	"Dragon"	TBA	Dominique Amouyal & Eric Veray	TBA
Achille loses his iguana, Dragon, after having brought it to a park to show off
8	"House of Cold Blood" "La maison du Sang Froid"	TBA	Franck Soullard	TBA
9	"Inseparable" "Inseparables"	TBA	TBA	TBA
12	"Monkey in Town" "Un singe dans la ville"	TBA	Georges-Olivier Tzanos & Max Mamoud	TBA
Ralph's capuchin monkey gets loose and runs amok in town
13	"Double Housing" "Double Foyer"	TBA	TBA	TBA
14	"Completely Nuts" "Une Chouette Mission"	TBA	TBA	TBA
15	"Junior"	TBA	TBA	TBA
16	"A Feathery Singer" "Un Melomane a plumes"	TBA	TBA	TBA
19	"A Mysterious Dog" "Un Chien Mysterieux"	TBA	TBA	TBA
20	"Golden Goose" "La Poule aux oeufs d'or"	TBA	TBA	TBA
23	"Like a Hurricane" "Comme un Ouragan"	TBA	TBA	TBA
25	"Pig Trip" "Un Tour de Cochon"	TBA	Ariane Desrieux	TBA
26	"The White Mouse" "Des Souris et des momes"	TBA	TBA	TBA
27	"No Rest for Petz Club" "Pas de vacances pour le Petz Club"	TBA	TBA	TBA
The Petz club are alerted to a Siberian husky who seems to have been abandoned by her owners while they are on vacation and discover she is not the only one...
28	"The Disappearing Tortoise" "L'envol de la Tortue"	TBA	Joris Morio	TBA
29	"The Hedgehog" "Zonzon le herisson"	TBA	TBA	TBA
The Petz Club help Nour, Oscar's crush, care for a hedgehog she found
36	"Are You There, Cat?" "Chat es-tu là ?"	TBA	Ariane Desrieux	TBA
Diane's Turkish van is seeing ghosts.
37	"Chirpy Runaway" "Piou Piou Pidou"	TBA	Justine Cheynet	TBA
40	"Super Sniffer" "Un Fugeur pas comme les Autres"	TBA	Max Mamoud & Georges-Olivier Tzanos	TBA
Zazim, Max's German shepherd, constantly runs away, only to howl in front of a certain building.
41	"Accident"	TBA	Hadrien Soulez Larivière	TBA
Chouchou, Elise's Chow-chow, was recently in a car accident and runs off upon being released from the veterinary clinic
42	"SOS Animalz" "SOS Zanimos"	TBA	Franck Soullard	TBA
Jean-Eudes will be shipped off to boarding school if he can't find his mom's old pekingese.
43	"A Poisonous Enigma" "Une enigme Empoisonnante"	TBA	TBA	TBA
A young girl named Elodie alerts the Petz Club to the fact that several dog have been poisoned recently.
44	"Stubborn as a Mule" "Tetu comme une mule"	TBA	TBA	TBA
46	"Biscotte"	TBA	TBA	TBA
47	"King Cat" "Le roi des chats"	TBA	Hadrien Soulez Larivière	TBA
When Simon's cat goes out of the house, the Petz Club tries to find him.
48	"Thief !" "Au Voleur !"	TBA	Justine Cheynet	TBA
50	"Traffic"	TBA	TBA	TBA
51	"The Parrot Lost Its Tongue" "Le perroquet a perdu sa langue"	TBA	Joris Morio	TBA

== Broadcast ==
Petz Club was broadcast on Radio Télévision Suisse in Switzerland, TFO in Canada from 2016 to 2017, Minimax in Central and Eastern Europe, Teletoon+ in Poland, and JeemTV.
