= Henri Carol =

Canon Henri Carol (18 January 1910 – 23 September 1984) was a French organist, improviser, chef de chœur, composer, and pipe organ teacher.

== Career ==
Born in Montpellier, Carol was a student at the Enclos Saint-François in Montpellier where he had Emmanuel Berlhe as his harmony and organ teacher. He obtained a first prize in piano at the Conservatoire de Bordeaux. Ordained a priest in 1933, he became a professor at the minor seminary of Saint-Roch in Montpellier where he held the position of chapel master.

In January 1946, he was appointed Director of the master's degree at the Monaco Cathedral, succeeding Canon Aurat, until June 1971.

A complete musician, he was at the same time Kapellmeister, composer, conductor, musicologist and, for eleven years, professor at the Academy of Music Prince Rainier III Foundation of Monaco (1967). He became titular organist of the great organ of Monaco Cathedral in 1968, succeeding Émile Bourdon.

In 1976, Carol published a precious little illustrated book on La Registration de l’orgue.

On the evening of Sunday, 23 September 1984, Carol died in a car accident in Montélimar. He was 74 years old.

After his death, his personal organ was installed in the Saint Reparata cathedral in Nice to serve in the choir.

== Works ==
Carol wrote music for organ: Variations sur un vieux noël montpelliérain, Marche solennelle

- music for piano: Pastels and Drôleries, Bouquet des chants de France
- religious music: 17 masses and many motets.

== Discography ==
- Quatre siècles de musique française - Henri Carol at the great organs of Monaco Cathedral (33 rpm)
- Anthologie de la musique italienne - Henri Carol on the Tamburini organ of the Saint-Charles de Monte-Carlo church, REM 31111
- Henri Carol (1910-1984) - Œuvres pour orgue, Gabriel Marghieri at the organ of the Monaco Cathedral, SOCD 173 on FreeDB
- Noels - Pièces pour orgue sur le thème de Noël, Olivier Vernet on the Tamburini organ of the Saint-Charles de Monte-Carlo church, Ligia Digital 0104237-11 on FreeDB.
