= Émile Bourdon =

French organist and composer

- Born: 14 February 1884; Lapalisse, Allier, France
- Died: 11 July 1974 (aged 90); Monaco
- Occupations: Organist; Composer

Joseph Antoine Émile Bourdon (French pronunciation: [emil buʁdɔ̃]; 14 February 1884 – 11 July 1974) was a 20th-century French organist and composer.

== Biography ==
Bourdon was the son of Magdelaine Louise Villate de Peufeilhoux (of noble descent) and Victor-Louis-Gabriel Bourdon (a financier). Later, he became a pupil of Alexandre Guilmant in the Conservatoire de Paris, Bourdon was a condisciple and friend of Marcel Dupré.

He was the organist of the great organ of the Saint Nicholas Cathedral of Monaco from 1922 to 1968, before canon Henri Carol succeeded him.

In addition, he was professor of organ at the Académie de Musique Fondation Prince Rainier III until 1968.

His wife Jeanne Barbezat died on 17 August 1974, and Bourdon himself died on 11 July of that year.

== Works ==
Bourdon is the author of several pieces for pipe organ including:

1. Dix Pièces Op. 7 (Paris, Leduc, 1921) :
  1. Offertoire pour la Fête de l'Assomption
  2. Carillons (popularised by Marcel Dupré)
  3. Méditation sur un Psaume d'Introït
  4. Sortie sur l'Hymne Veni Creator Spiritus
  5. Bénédiction nuptiale
  6. In memoriam
  7. Sur l'Alleluia de la Fête de saint Louis
  8. Légende pour la Toussaint
  9. Triptyque sur la Prose de la Fête-Dieu
  10. Toccata sur deux noëls
2. Six Pièces (1926) (Delatour, 2009) :
  1. Thème développé
  2. Final en Ré
  3. Complainte
  4. Communion sur "Dic nobis, Maria" de la prose de Pâques
  5. Allegro symphonique
  6. Elégie
3. Première symphonie Op.10 (Paris, Leduc, 1925)
4. Marche Solennelle Op. 19 (Paris, Bornemann, 1947)
5. Dix nouvelles pièces pour orgue, Op. 18 (Paris, Lemoine, 1952)
  1. Offertoire en l’honneur de Ste Thérèse de l’Enfant Jésus
  2. Elegie
  3. Intermezzo
  4. Canzonetta
  5. Pastorale
  6. Fantasie rhapsodique pour une Fête patronale
  7. Menuet
  8. Pièce sur des Graduels
  9. Final Romantique en Si
  10. Alleluias de Pâques
6. Cortège Nuptial Op. 38, dedicated to H.R.H. Prince Rainier III and to Madame la Princesse Grace de Monaco, for the celebration of their marriage on 19 April 1956 (unpublished)

Other:

- Andantino religioso for organ and cello (or alto)
- Tantum ergo for choir, organ and horn
- Idylle for orchestra
- Poème élégiaque for cello and orchestra
- Trio en mi mineur for piano, violin and cello
- Sacred motets.

== Sources ==
- Bourdon (1884-1974) organiste et compositeur, Louis Sauvé. - preface by Marie-Claire Alain, Éditions De L'officine, 2004, 342 p.
- Émile Bourdon, Six Pièces pour orgue
