= Jean-Charles Emmerich =

Monegasque politician

Member of the National Council

Personal details
- Born: 9 September 1976 (age 49) Monaco

Jean-Charles Emmerich (born 9 September 1976, Monaco) is a Monegasque politician. Since February 2018, he is a member of the National Council of Monaco from the political group Priority Monaco (Primo!).

== Life ==
Jean-Charles Emmerich was born on 9 September 1976 in Monaco. Since 2015, he is a General secretary of the American Games Management Union. Previously Emmerich worked as a manager of an IT company and now is an executive of Société des bains de mer (SBM).

Emmerich is married.

== Political career ==
In National elections of 2018, Emmerich was elected a member of the National Council of Monaco from the political group Priority Monaco (Primo!) receiving 2,641 votes. In December 2019, he voted for the bill, which facilitates the opening of shops on Sundays in Monaco, saying that it is a necessary reform both for employers and for employees.
