= Karen Aliprendi =

Monegasque politician

Karen Aliprendi de Carvalho

Member of the National Council

Personal details
- Born: June 12, 1986 (age 40) Monaco

Karen Aliprendi de Carvalho is a Monegasque politician, member of the National Council since was elected in the 2018 general election. She is from Priorité Monaco political party.
