= Corinne Bertani =

Monegasque politician

Member of the National Council

Personal details
- Born: 5 June 1959 (age 67) Algiers, Algiers

Corinne Bertani (born 5 June 1959, Algiers) is a Monegasque politician. She has been a national councillor from a political group Primo! (Priority Monaco) since 2018.

== Life and career ==
Corinne Bertani was born on 5 June 1959 in Algiers. She received a Bachelor in Economics and BTS (brevet de technicien supérieur) Tourism.

Since 1996, Bertani has been the President of the Monegasque Union of Travel Agencies (SMAV). Since 2006 she has been a member of the Labor Court. From 2009 to 2019 Bertani was a secretary general of the Federation of Monegasque Enterprises (FEDEM). Currently she is a member of Federal Bureau of the FEDEM.

Bertani is a Director of the Heli Air Voyages agency.

In 2018, Bertani was elected as a member of the National Council of Monaco from the political group Primo!

In March 2020, Bertani appealed the inhabitants of the Principality of Monaco in order to stop over-consumption panic and crowding in the supermarkets caused by the spread of coronavirus. She ensured that there is no and there will be no supply problem.

In July 2020, Bertani was a rapporteur of the document establishing family benefits for the self-employed in the National Council of Monaco and explained the problem in detail.
