= Marc Mourou =

Monegasque politician

Member of the National Council

Personal details
- Born: 3 May 1986 (age 40) Monaco

Marc Mourou (born 3 May 1986, Monaco) is Monegasque politician. Since 2018, he is a member of the National Council of Monaco and the President of Social Interests and Diverse Affairs Committee (CISAD).

== Life ==
Marc Mourou was born on 3 May 1986 in Monaco. He attended Albert 1st lyceum. Mourou graduated with a Master II in Marketing and Creativity from ESCP Europe and a Master II in Project Management from INSEEC. Previously, Mourou underwent internships in different business sectors, such as Pepsi-Cola, Hilton, Mediapost and is CEO and partner of Vertige Monaco SARL since 2015. He also graduated with an MBA from Politecnico di Milano.

== Political career ==
In 2018, Mourou was elected as one of the youngest members of the National Council of Monaco on the list of the political group Priority Monaco (Primo!). He is the President of the Education, Youth and Sports Commission at the National Council of Monaco (Parliament) and one of the youngest national advisers. As the President of the Education, Youth and Sports Commission, Mourou is convinced that distance learning during COVID-19 pandemic can only be complementary and will never replace actual contact with the teacher.

Following the designation by H.S.H. Prince Albert II of Christophe Robino as Minister of Social Affairs and Health, the elected members of the National Council elected Marc Mourou on 25 April 2022 as the new President of Social Interests and Diverse Affairs Committee (CISAD) at the Parliament. Marc Mourou studies all texts related to labor and social law. He is also responsible for all matters related to health and provides his opinion on social issues that directly affect the Monegasque population (pensions, medical conventions, etc.).
