= Marie-Noëlle Gibelli =

Monegasque politician

- Born: June 28, 1957 (age 69); Monaco
- Occupation: Politician

Marie-Noëlle Gibelli (born 28 June 1957), is a Monegasque politician and midwife, member of the National Council since was elected in the 2018 general election.

She was born in Monaco on 28 June 1957 and is from Primo ! Priorité Monaco political party.
