= Michèle Dittlot =

Monegasque politician

Member of the National Council

Personal details
- Born: 4 March 1949 (age 77) Guelma, Algiers

Michèle Dittlot (born 4 March 1949, Guelma, Algiers) is a Monegasque politician. She is a member of National Council of Monaco and vice-president of the Committee for the Culture and Heritage. She is a Knight of the Order of Saint-Charles, Knight of the Order of Cultural Merit, Officer of the Order of Academic Palms and Officer of the Order of La Pléiade.

== Life and career ==
Michèle Dittlot was born on 4 March 1949 in Guelma, Algiers. She has a certificate of aptitude for secondary education teaching in biology and geology and a Master of Physiology. Dittlot taught science at school.

Since 1997 she is a member of UNAM (National Union for the Future of Monaco/Union Nationale pour l'Avenir de Monaco) political group. From 2003 to 2008 and then from 2008 to 2013 Dittlot was a member of National Council of Monaco and the president of the Culture and Heritage Commission at the National Council during both terms of office. Since 2016 Dittlot is a president of the association “Les Amis du Printemps des Arts de Monte-Carlo”.

In 2018, Dittlot was elected to the National Council of Monaco from the political group Primo! (Priority Monaco).

In 2019 Dittlot on the proposal of the National Council became a member of a Heritage Council created to preserve and promote the national heritage of Monaco. As of July 2020 she is a vice-president of the Committee for the Culture and Heritage.

Dittlot is a president of the Monegasque section at the Parliamentary Assembly of the Francophonie (APF). She speaks against the anglicisms and the advertisements in English in Monaco.

== Awards and honors ==
Dittlot is a holder of following orders: Knight of the Order of Saint-Charles, Knight of the Order of Cultural Merit, Officer of the Order of Academic Palms and Officer of the Order of La Pléiade.
