= Christophe Robino =

Monegasque politician

Member of the National Council

Personal details
- Born: 21 October 1966 (age 59) Monaco

Christophe Robino (born 21 October 1966) is a Monegasque politician. He is currently a member of the National Council of Monaco. He is a former member of the party Priorité Monaco but withdrew his political affiliation to take up a position as a Government Minister. He was formerly President of the Commission for Social Affairs and Diverse Opportunities.

Following the passing of approval by the Minister of State and with the proceeding Sovereign Ordinance, Christophe Robino was made Minister for Social Affairs and Health. He serves under Minister of State Pierre Dartout.

He is a Doctor of Medicine, specialist in nephrology and medical resuscitation, Head of service at Princess Grace Hospital Center (CHPG) and vice-president of the Monaco order of Physicians.

== Life ==
Christophe Robino was born on 21 October 1966 in Hyères. He obtained Diploma of Complementary Specialized Studies in Medical Resuscitation and Diploma of Specialized Studies in Nephrology. Previously Robino worked as a President of the Establishment Medical Commission and member of the Board of Directors of Princess Grace Hospital Center and Deputy Head of Nephrology and Medical Resuscitation at the Princess Grace Hospital of Monaco. He is a Doctor of Medicine, specialist in nephrology and medical resuscitation, Head of service at Princess Grace Hospital Center (CHPG) and vice-president of the Monaco order of Physicians.

Robino is married and has three children.

== Political career ==
In 1998, Robino ran for the National Council elections for the first time. In 2013-2018, he was elected a National Councilor on Horizon Monaco list. From 2016 to 2018, Robino was a President of Education and Youth Commission. Since 2018, he is a member of the National Council of Monaco from the political group Priority Monaco (Primo!) and a president of the Commission for Social Interests and Miscellaneous Affairs (CISAD).

== Honors ==
- Officer of the Order of Saint-Charles
- Grand Officier de l'Ordre de l'Etoile d'Italie
- Commander of the Equestrian Order of the Holy Sepulcher of Jerusalem
- Bronze medal of National Defense (France)
- Medal of International Merit of Blood
