= Pierre Van Klaveren =

Monegasque politician

Member of the National Council

Personal details
- Born: 15 August 1985 (age 41) Monaco

Pierre Van Klaveren (born 15 August 1985) is a Monegasque politician. Since 2018, he is a member of the National Council of Monaco and the President of the Special Olympic Monaco Association. He is a co-founder of vk*p (Van Klaveren & Pazzaglia) advisory firm in Monaco.

== Life ==
Pierre Van Klaveren was born on 15 August 1985. He holds a master's degree in Communication from Sunshine Coast University, Australia and a master's degree in International Relations from IE Business School, Madrid. Since 2000, Van Klaveren was involved in community life alongside Special Olympic Monaco Association, becoming advisor to the President and member of the Board of Directors.

Since 2018, he is the President of the Special Olympic Monaco Association. In 2019, Klaveren together with Aymeric Pazzaglia co-founded an advisory firm vk*p (Van Klaveren & Pazzaglia) in Monaco.

== Political career ==
In 2011-2019 Klaveren was a civil servant in the Monegasque Government, Principal Administrator at the Welcome Office, Directorate of Economic Expansion, Department of Finance and Economy. In 2018, he was elected as a National Councilor on the Primo! (Priority Monaco) list.

Klaveren is a holder of physical education and sports silver medal. He is fluent in French, English and Spanish, and has basic knowledge of Portuguese.

== Personal life ==
Klaveren is married and has one child.
