= Jean-Louis Grinda =

Monegasque politician

Vice President of the National Council
- Incumbent
- Assumed office 16 February 2023
- Monarch: Albert II
- President: Brigitte Boccone-Pagès; Thomas Brezzo
- Preceded by: Balthazar Seydoux

Member of the National Council
- Incumbent
- Assumed office 10 February 2013
- Monarch: Albert II

Personal details
- Born: 25 January 1960 (age 66) Monaco
- Party: Monegasque National Union
- Children: 4
- Education: Paris-Panthéon-Assas University (BEc)

Jean-Louis Grinda (born 25 January 1960) is a Monegasque opera manager and politician. He has been the director of the Opéra de Monte-Carlo since 2007, and he serves as a member of the National Council. Grinda currently serves as the President of the Commission for the Monitoring of the Constitutional Reserve Fund and the Modernisation of Public Accounts. Grinda is from the political party Union Monégasque, which currently retain one seat in the National Council.
