= José Badia =

Monegasque politician

Member of the National Council

Personal details
- Born: 2 January 1945 (age 81) Monaco

José Badia (born 2 January 1945, Monaco) is a Monegasque politician. Since 2018, he is a member of the National Council of Monaco from Priority Monaco (Primo!) political group and the president of the External Relations Commission.

== Life ==
José Badia was born on 2 January 1945 in Monaco. He obtained a degree in Civil Engineering from the Marseille School of Engineering. From 1985 until 2000, Badia was a president of the Amateurs of Monaco Filmmakers and Photographers CINEAM.

Badia is married and has three children.

== Career ==
In 1990-1995, he served as a Director General of the Department of the Interior, Director General of the Department of Public Works and Social Affairs and became Government Councilor, Minister for Public Works and Social Affairs.

Between 1995 and 2000 Badia was a founding president of the Association of Pilots and Aircraft Owners of Monaco (AOPA). In the same years, from 1995 to 2000, he was a Commissioner General in charge of the Monaco Pavilion at the Lisbon 98 and Hanover 2000 World Fairs, and from 1995 to 1998, he was President of the Monaco Scientific Centre.

In 1997-1998 Badia was a Secretary General of World Association of Children’s Friends (AMADE), and in 1998-2000 served as a vice-president of the Association of Audiovisual Archives of Monaco.

From 2000 to 2005, Badia served as Government Councilor, Minister of Public Works and Social Affairs.

In 2005-2007 Badia was an Ambassador Extraordinary and Plenipotentiary of His Serene Highness the Sovereign Prince of Monaco to His Majesty the King of Spain, and in 2007-2010 – an Ambassador Extraordinary and Plenipotentiary of His Serene Highness the Sovereign Prince of Monaco to His Majesty the King of the Belgians, Her Majesty the Queen of the Netherlands and His Royal Highness the Grand Duke of Luxembourg, as well as Head of the Mission of Monaco to the European Communities.

On 1 January 2011, Badia took his duties as a Government Councilor, Minister for External Relations. In May 2011, he led a Monegasque delegation at United Nations Conference on Least developed countries (LDCs) in Istanbul.

Badia held the position of Government Counselor for External Relations and International Cooperation of the Principality of Monaco until 2015 when he was appointed a Minister Plenipotentiary of the Principality of Monaco.

In November 2017, Badia lost his title of Minister Plenipotentiary as he chose to join Priority Monaco (Primo!) political group for the national elections. From 2018 Badia is a member of the National Council of Monaco from Priority Monaco (Primo!) political group and the president of the External Relations Commission.

He is a representative of Monaco in the Parliamentary Assembly of the Council of Europe (PACE) since March 2018. Badia is also a Deputy Head of the Delegation of Monaco at Organization for Security and Co-operation in Europe Parliamentary Assembly (OSCEPA).

== Honors ==
- Officer of the Order of Saint-Charles
- Officer of the Legion of Honor of the French Republic
- Grand Cross of the Order pro merito Melitensi (Sovereign Military Order of Malta)
- Commander of the Order of Merit of the Republic of Poland
- Commander of the Sacred Military Constantinian Order of Saint George
