= Marine Grisoul =

Monegasque politician

Member of the National Council

Personal details
- Born: July 28, 1988 (age 38) Alès, France

Marine Grisoul (born 28 July 1988, Alès, France) is a Monegasque politician and the youngest member of the National Council of Monaco.

== Life ==
Marine Grisoul was born on 28 July 1988 in Alès, France. Having received a diploma in therapeutic education and higher technician certificate (BTS) in dietetics and nutrition, Grisoul worked as a director of a dietetics and nutrition firm in Paris. Currently she is a dietitian and nutritionist at Princess Grace Hospital Center (CHPG).

== Political career ==
Grisoul met Stéphane Valeri in June 2017, which led her to co-found and become the Secretary General of the political group Primo! (Priority Monaco). In 2018, Grisoul was elected a member of the National Council of Monaco from Primo! She became the youngest member of the National Council. Grisoul was elected Female Personality of the Year 2018 in the Principality.

In 2020, Grisoul reported about the bill on unconventional care practices approved by the National Council in favor of alternative medicines. In April 2022, she was appointed president of the Commission de l'Éducation, de la Jeunesse et des Sports (CENJS) of Monaco.

== Personal life ==
She has a son. Her married name is Marine Hugonnet-Grisoul.
