= Pierre Bardy (politician) =

Monegasque politician (born 1987)

Member of the National Council

Personal details
- Born: 4 September 1987 (age 38) Monaco

Pierre Bardy (born 4 September 1987) is a Monegasque politician. From 2018 until 2023, he was a member of the National Council of Monaco. He is a Director of Cometh-Somoclim's Maintenance Department.

== Life ==
Pierre Bardy was born on 4 September 1987 in Monaco. He graduated with a master's degree in International Trade from Kedge Business School in Bordeaux, France.

From 2010 until 2018, Bardy worked as market analyst at different branches of ENGIE in Paris, London, Zurich, and Monaco. He is a Director of Cometh-Somoclim's Maintenance Department.

He is married and has one child.

== Political career ==
In 2018, Bardy was elected as a member of the National Council of Monaco on the list of the political group Primo! (Priority Monaco). Bardy is a member of the association “Energy Assistance Monaco”. In 2019, Bardy awarded the Conseil National Award at the Graduation of the International School of Monaco students.
