= Balthazar Seydoux =

Monegasque politician

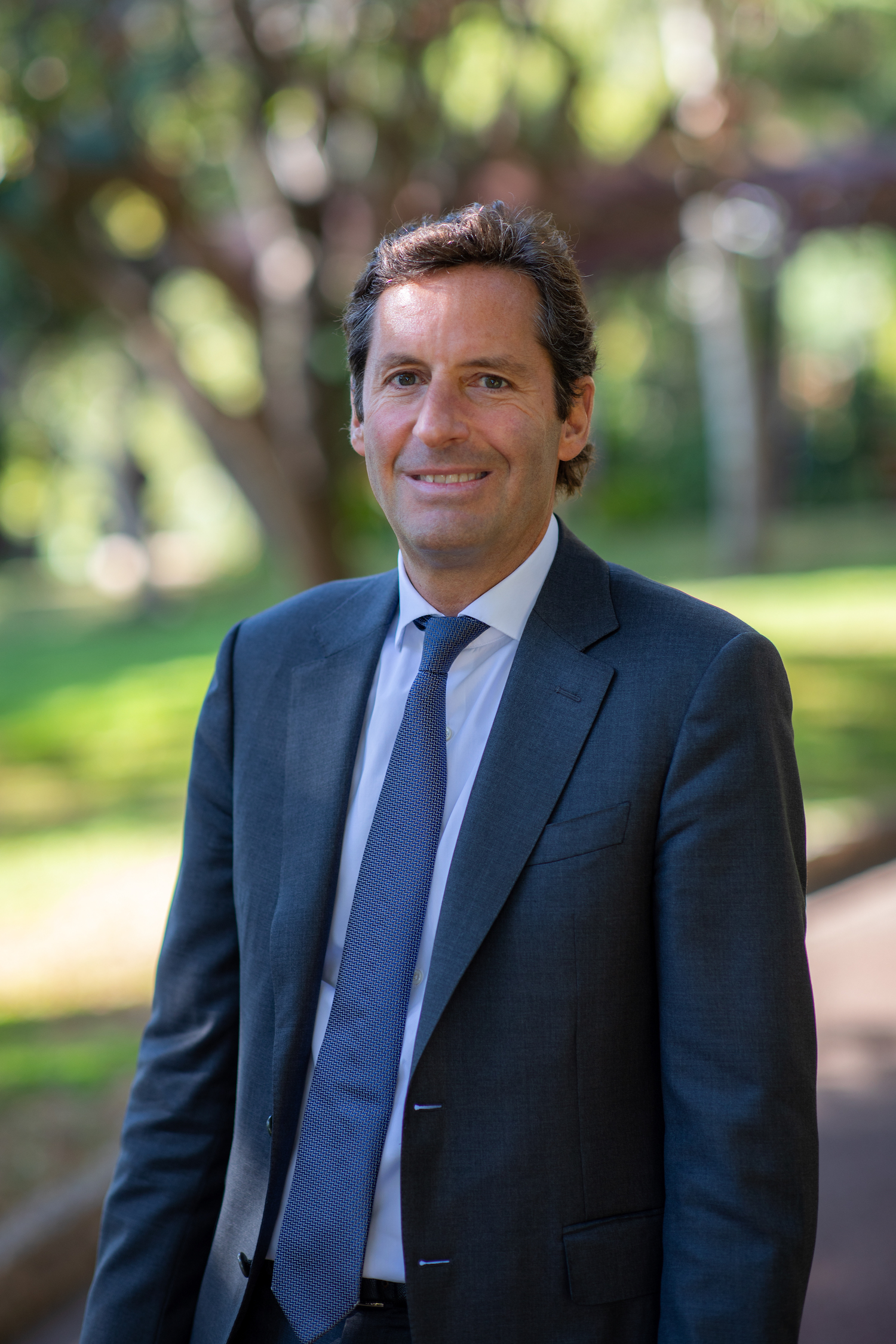

Member of the National Council
- Incumbent
- Assumed office 2018

Personal details
- Born: August 13, 1971 (age 54) Paris, France
- Political party: Primo! Priorité Monaco; Monegasque National Union

Balthazar Seydoux de Clausonne (born 13 August 1971) is a Monegasque politician. Since 2018, he is a member of the National Council of Monaco and a president of the Finance and National Economy Commission. He was named Vice President of the National Council following the 2023 elections.

== Life ==
Balthazar Seydoux was born on 13 August 1971 in Paris. He graduated from Paris Descartes University with a master's degree in Business Law (DESS).

Seydoux started his career at the Pechiney subsidiary as a financial controller in Paris. Later he worked as a financial controller at Disney Partner Group Russell Reynolds Associates for five years. In 2003, Seydoux founded his own recruitment company Human Asset Executive Search.

== Political career ==
In 2018, Seydoux was elected as a member of the National Council of Monaco from the political group Primo! (Priority Monaco). He was appointed as a President of the Finance and National Economy Commission. In December 2020, Seydoux spoke in the National Council on behalf the Primo! majority regarding the review of the budget for 2021.

== Personal life ==
Seydoux is married and has two daughters. His wife Annabelle Jaeger-Seydoux is in charge of the energy transition mission since 2019.
