= Daniel Boéri =

Monegasque politician

Member of the National Council
- In office 21 February 2013 – 16 February 2023

Personal details
- Born: 1 March 1944 (age 82) Monaco
- Party: New Ideas for Monaco
- Other political affiliations: Horizon Monaco (until 2018); Priorité Monaco (2018–2022)
- Education: HEC Paris; University of Paris

Daniel Boéri (born 1 March 1944) is a Monegasque sociologist and politician. He served as a member of the National Council from 2013 to 2023, and is the author of several books.
