= Nathalie Amoratti-Blanc =

Monegasque politician

Member of the National Council

Personal details
- Born: September 17, 1964 (age 61) Sète, France

Nathalie Amoratti-Blanc (born 17 September 1964) is a Monegasque politician. She is a national councilor and the president of the Commission on Women's and Family Rights in the National Council of Monaco.

== Life ==
Nathalie Amoratti-Blanc was born on 17 September 1964 in Sète, France. In 1986, she obtained a diploma in massage and kinesiotherapy and until 2012 worked as a physiotherapist. Since 2013 Amoratti-Blanc is a management attaché for the retirement homes “A Quietudine” and “Cap Fleuri”.

Amoratti-Blanc is married and has 3 children.

== Political career ==
In 1998, Amoratti-Blanc was a candidate for the National Council elections. Since 2013, she is a member of the National Council.

In 2017, Amoratti-Blanc spoke at the opening of a new Monaco based association “She Can He Can” about the importance of the UN recognition of October 11 as the International Day of the Girl, girls' empowerment and their fundamental rights.

In 2018, Amoratti-Blanc was reelected to the National Council as a member of Primo! (Priority Monaco) political group. She is the President of the Commission on Women's and Family Rights.

Amoratti-Blanc is a Head of Monegasque Delegation in Parliamentary Dimension of the Organization for Security and Co-operation in Europe (OSCEPA).

In 2018, Amoratti-Blanc discussed with President of the National Council Stéphane Valeri such topics as the gender pay gap, same-sex unions, abortion and inequalities between the sexes in the Principality. She said that the gender pay gap was made a priority for herself and the National Council by establishing a commission of control and claims for wage inequalities.

In 2019, Amoratti-Blanc presented a bill on the decriminalization of abortion in the Principality of Monaco, addressing the issue of its prevention. At the same time, she proposed to examine the lengthening of paternity leave to improve the situation of women.

In January 2020, Amoratti-Blanc noted that her commission did not receive from the government the required budget.

In March 2020, Amoratti-Blanc spoke on gender equality for International Women's Day and praised the work of the Committee for the Promotion and Protection of Women's Rights.
