= Guillaume Rose =

Monegasque politician

Member of the National Council

Personal details
- Born: 6 January 1969 (age 57) Monaco

Guillaume Rose (born 6 January 1969, Monaco) is a Monegasque politician. Since 2018, he is a member of the National Council of Monaco and the President of the Environment and Quality of Life Commission. Since 2019, he is also an Executive Director General of the Monaco Economic Board.

== Life ==
Guillaume Rose was born on 6 January 1969 in Monaco. He studied screenwriting and graduated from the Sorbonne in Paris with a Master’s degree in film studies. For four years, Rose lived in Paris working in TV and film industry before coming back to Monaco in 1997. He started working in communications for the Société des Bains de Mer (SBM) becoming head of the department responsible for promoting gaming. He obtained a Corporate MBA at International University of Monaco. After that, Rose went to Las Vegas to gain experience in hotel and casino management. Upon returning to Monaco, he was appointed Executive Assistant to the CEO of SBM and then took responsibility for entire Communication Department of the group. Rose left SBM in 2010 and the same year he joined the Principality’s Tourism Department becoming the President of the Monaco Tourism Authority of the Principality of Monaco in 2011. In 2019, Rose was appointed an Executive Director General of the Monaco Economic Board.

Rose is married and has three children.

== Political career ==
In 2008, Rose became a founding member of the political union Monegasque Union and was elected as a National Councilor in 2008-2013. He was a President of the Commission for Social Interests and Miscellaneous Affairs (2010-2013) and the President of the Commission for Culture (2010-2011).

In 2018, Rose was elected a member of the National Council of Monaco from political group Priority Monaco (Primo!) and was appointed the President of the Environment and Quality of Life Commission. Rose is a member of Parliamentary Assembly of the Council of Europe representing the Principality of Monaco.

== Orders ==
- Knight of the Order of Saint-Charles
- Grand Prix de L’Hotellerie Monegasque 2017
