= Monaco Economic Board =

Monegasque economic association

Monaco Economic Board (MEB) is a Monegasque association promoting economic dynamism of the Principality. MEB was established in 1999 with the support of the Prince’s Government. Its mission is to seek new investors by organizing business promotional operations abroad. MEB consists of two departments: Monaco Chamber of Commerce that serves the development of 500 Monaco-based member companies; and Invest Monaco that seeks and supports foreign business organizations and individuals who wish to set up in the Principality. The President of the MEB is Michel Dotta.

== History ==
Monaco Economic Board was established in 1999 with the support of the Prince’s Government. In 2016, Economic Development Chamber was renamed to Monaco Economic Board.

In 2019, Monaco Economic Board celebrated its 20-anniversary and made an exploratory trip to St. Petersburg, Russia with the aim to expand trade and create opportunities for business. In 2020, MEB adopted new working methods such as teleworking and videoconferencing during lockdown. In March 2021, MEB organized a virtual trade mission to Delhi.
