= Franck Julien (politician) =

Monegasque politician

Member of the National Council

Personal details
- Born: July 20, 1964 (age 62) Monaco

Franck Julien (born 20 July 1964) is a Monegasque politician. Since February 2018, he is a member of the National Council of Monaco from a political group Priority Monaco (Primo!). He is currently the president of the Commission for the digital development of the National Council.

== Life ==
Franck Julien was born on 20 July 1964 in Monaco. He obtained diploma of Higher Technical Studies National Conservatory of Arts and Crafts. Julien previously worked as Administrative and Financial Director at Monaco Telematics SAM, Managing Director of the Société Monégasque de Télédistribution and Technical Director at Monaco Telecom. Currently he is an administrative and financial director.

Julien is married and has three children.

== Political career ==
In 2018, Julien became a founding member, a treasurer and a candidate on the list of the political group Priority Monaco (Primo!). He was appointed the president of the Commission for the digital development of the National Council. As the president of the Commission for the digital development, Julien emphasized on the protection of privacy and respect for individual freedoms stating that digital tracing of contacts with persons who contracted coronavirus should be voluntary. He believes that, even if the health situation is exceptional, the Covid-19 epidemic cannot justify everything.

In June 2020 the Commission for the digital development presided by Julien examined the bill relating to token offers which was long awaited in the context of the Principality’s digital transformation.
