= Fabrice Notari =

Monegasque politician (born 1958)

Personal information
- Nationality: Monegasque
- Born: 26 April 1958 (age 68)

Sport
- Sport: Alpine skiing

Fabrice Notari (born 26 April 1958) is a Monegasque politician, architect and former alpine skier; he competed in two events at the 1988 Winter Olympics. He is a member of Priorité Monaco as well as the National Council of Monaco.
