= Béatrice Fresko-Rolfo =

Monegasque politician

Member of the National Council
- Incumbent
- Assumed office 8 March 2013

Chairperson of the PACE Committee on Equality and Non-Discrimination
- Incumbent
- Assumed office 27 January 2026
- Preceded by: Doris Fiala

President of the National Council Committee on Women's Rights, Family and Equality
- Incumbent
- Assumed office 2024
- Preceded by: Christine Pasquier-Ciulla

President of the National Council Committee on Women's Rights and Family
- In office 2013–2016

Representative of Monaco to the Parliamentary Assembly of the Council of Europe
- Incumbent
- Assumed office 8 March 2013

Personal details
- Born: February 12, 1969 (age 57) Monaco
- Party: Monegasque National Union

Béatrice Fresko-Rolfo (born 12 February 1969, Monaco) is a Monegasque politician. Since 2013, Fresko-Rolfo is a member of National Council of Monaco.

== Career ==
In 2008, Fresko-Rolfo was a candidate for the national elections from the party Rally & Issues (Rassemblement et Enjeux). Since 2010, she is a member of the executive board of Rally & Issues. Since 2013, Fresko-Rolfo was elected as a national councilor from the political group Horizon Monaco (HM).

In 2016, Fresko-Rolfo as a President of the Women and Family Commission at the National Council was a member of the Prize Committee for the Monte-Carlo “Woman of the Year” contest.

For the general elections in February 2018, Fresko-Rolfo was a leader of Horizon Monaco. Before the general elections of 2018, she announced her candidacy for the presidency in the National Council.

In November 2018, Fresko-Rolfo visited the Women Leaders Global Forum in Reykjavík, Iceland to share ideas and experiences for women participation in economic and political development of the countries.

Fresko-Rolfo is representative of Monaco in Parliamentary Assembly of the Council of Europe.

== Personal life ==
Fresko-Rolfo is married and has two children.
