= Franck Lobono =

Monegasque politician

Member of the National Council

Personal details
- Born: March 10, 1968 (age 58) Monaco
- Occupation: Politician

Franck Lobono (born 10 March 1968 in Monaco) is a Monegasque politician. Since 2018, he is a member of the National Council of Monaco and a President of the Housing Commission.

== Life ==
Franck Lobono was born on 10 March 1968 in Monaco. From 1978 to 1986, he attended Arbert 1st School in Monaco. Previously Lobono was a Vice-President of the Association of Young Monegasques. Before being elected to the National Council in 2018, Lobono was a President of the Jardins d’Apolline Resident's Association. He is a company manager, deputy chairman of Media and Events, and a President of the "Pontons de Monaco" association.

== Political career ==
In 2018, Lobono was elected to the National Council of Monaco from the political group Priority Monaco (Primo!). The same year he was appointed as a President of the Housing Commission. As a President of the Housing Commission, Lobono declares that by the end of 2022 the problem of housing shortage will be solved in Monaco.
