= Brigitte Boccone-Pagès =

Monegasque politician (born 1959)

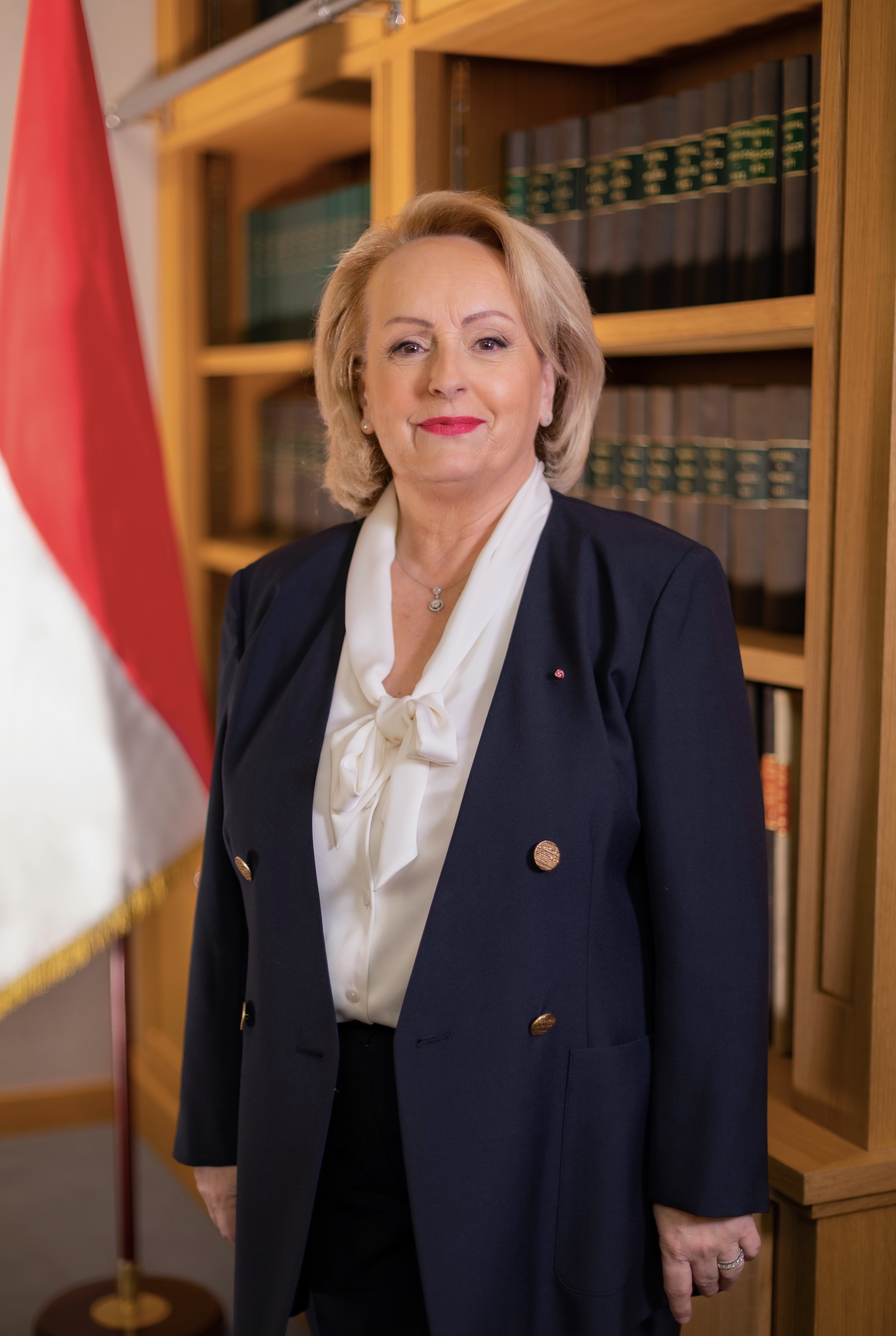
- Official portrait, 2023

President of the National Council
- In office 6 October 2022 – 3 April 2024
- Monarch: Albert II
- Preceded by: Stéphane Valeri
- Succeeded by: Thomas Brezzo

Member of the National Council
- Monarch: Albert II

Personal details
- Born: 8 May 1959 (age 66) Monaco

Brigitte Boccone-Pagès (born 8 May 1959) is a Monégasque politician, who served as the president of the National Council from 6 October 2022 to 3 April 2024 and was the first woman to hold this position. She was elected vice president of the National Council on 22 February 2018. In October 2022, Boccone-Pagès was elected president of the National Council, following the unexpected resignation of Stéphane Valeri, making her the first woman to hold the position. She chose Balthazar Seydoux as her vice president. On 5 February 2023, she topped the poll as her Monegasque National Union won all 24 seats in the 2023 Monegasque general election.

== Honors ==
- Commander of the Monegasque Associative Order in 2008.
- Commander of the Order of Academic Palms on 9 January 2018.
- Commander of the Order of the Star of Italy on 21 June 2021.
- Officer of the Order of Saint-Charles in November 2021
- Knight of the Legion of Honor in December 2021
