= Monegasque National Union =

Electoral list in Monaco

Monegasque National Union Union Nationale Monégasque
- Abbreviation: UNM
- Leader: Brigitte Boccone-Pagès
- Founder: Brigitte Boccone-Pagès
- Founded: 17 October 2022
- Ideology: Conservatism; Euroscepticism; Monarchism
- Political position: Centre to right-wing
- List members: Priorité Monaco; Horizon Monaco; Union Monégasque
- Colours: Red
- National Council: 24 / 24

Website
- www.lunionmc.org

The Monegasque National Union (French: Union Nationale Monégasque, UNM) is a Monegasque electoral list consisting of three parties: Priorité Monaco, Horizon Monaco, and Union Monégasque. It has been led by Brigitte Boccone-Pagès of Priorité Monaco since 2022. It won all the seats in the National Council in the 2023 general election.

== History ==
The UNM was founded on 17 October 2022 and included 23 of the 24 members of the National Council at the time. It consisted of three constituent parties: Priorité Monaco, Horizon Monaco, and Union Monégasque. Brigitte Boccone-Pagès of Priorité Monaco, then the president of the National Council, was selected to lead the list. On 14 November 2022, the list presented its candidates for the 2023 general election, which was held on 5 February 2023. The UNM's main challenger in the election was the newly formed, centre-left New Ideas for Monaco. The UNM won the election with 89.6% of the vote, gaining all 24 seats on the National Council.

== Ideology ==
The French thinktank Geopolitical Studies Group describes the UNM as conservative, Eurosceptic, and right-wing. The newsite Euractiv meanwhile describes it as a coalition of Eurosceptic and monarchist parties. Of the constituent parties, Priorité Monaco has also been described as liberal conservative, Horizon Monaco as national conservative, and Union Monégasque as centrist. During the press conference announcing the UNM's creation, Boccone-Pagès described it as a "balanced list" with the shared goal of creating a united government which could "accomplish, for the next five years, a solid, comprehensive and responsible plan".

== Electoral history ==
National Council election results
| Election | Party leader | Votes | % | Seats | +/− | Position | Ref. |
|---|---|---|---|---|---|---|---|
| 2023 | Brigitte Boccone-Pagès | 72,602 | 89.6 | 24 / 24 | New | 1st | |
