= Thomas Brezzo =

Monegasque lawyer and politician

His Excellency Thomas Brezzo

President of the National Council
- Incumbent
- Assumed office 3 April 2024
- Monarch: Albert II
- Vice President: Jean-Louis Grinda
- Preceded by: Brigitte Boccone-Pagès

Member of the National Council
- Incumbent
- Assumed office February 2018
- Monarch: Albert II

Personal details
- Born: 27 September 1979 (age 46) Monaco
- Citizenship: Monaco
- Party: Priorité Monaco
- Children: 2
- Education: Lycée Albert Premier
- Alma mater: University of Nice Sophia Antipolis; Aix-Marseille University

Thomas Brezzo (born 27 September 1979) is a Monegasque lawyer and politician who has served as President of the National Council since 3 April 2024. He is a member of the National Council of Monaco and President of the Legislation Commission since February 2018.

== Life ==
Thomas Brezzo was born on 27 September 1979. He obtained Master of Private Law and Criminal Sciences at University of Nice Sophia Antipolis in 2004, and Master II Research – Criminal Law at UFR Aix-en-Provence in 2005. In 2010, Brezzo created and headed a legal consultancy firm “Monaco Legal Consulting”, and in 2016, he was admitted to the Monaco Bar.

Brezzo is married and has two children. Involved in sports activities such as kick-boxing, automobiles and underwater exploration, he is a promoter of combat sports and has been dedicated to combat sports related NGOs for over 15 years. Brezzo is a vice-president of the International Academy of Kick-Boxing, Muaythai and Krav-Maga, secretary general of the Monegasque Kick-Boxing and Krav Maga Federation, Member of the Commissaries Corps of the Automobile Club de Monaco, and Member of the club of Monaco Underwater Exploration (CESMM).

== Career ==
In February 2018, he was elected as a member of the National Council of Monaco from the political group Priority Monaco (Primo!). Brezzo was appointed the President of the Legislation Commission. In January 2019, he created a partnership with Thomas Giaccardi and joined his firm. In July 2020, Brezzo drafted a law on judiciary aimed to strengthen its independence guaranteed by the Constitution of 1962. During his presidency in the Legislation Commission, he also was Rapporteur of Law No. 1.462 strengthening the Anti-Money Laundering, Financing on Terrorism and Corruption Mechanism (transcribing the (EU) 4th AML Directive) and of Law No. 1.464 strengthening the protection of persons against defamation and insult.

Brezzo is an Alternate Member of the Monaco Delegation in Organization for Security and Co-operation in Europe Parliamentary Assembly (OSCEPA).
