= Priorité Monaco =

Political party in Monaco

Priority Monaco Priorité Monaco
- Leader: Stéphane Valeri
- Founded: September 2017
- Ideology: Liberalism; Euroscepticism; Monarchism
- Political position: Centre-right
- National affiliation: Monegasque National Union
- National Council: 13 / 24

Priorité Monaco (English: Priority Monaco), styled Primo! (First!), is a Monegasque political party. It was founded by Stéphane Valeri in September 2017. It won the 2018 general election. Priorité Monaco was in the 2023 election part of the political list, the Monegasque National Union, which won all the seats in the National Council.

== Electoral history ==
=== National Council elections ===
Election	Party leader	Votes	%	Seats	+/–	Position
2018	Stéphane Valeri	63,806	57.7	21 / 24	New	1st
2023 (Note: Run as part of the Monegasque National Union coalition, which won 24 seats in total.)	Stéphane Valeri	72,602	89.6	13 / 24	▼8	1st
