= 2018 in Monaco =

- Decades: 1990s; 2000s; 2010s; 2020s
- See also: History of Monaco; List of years in Monaco

Events in the year 2018 in Monaco.

== Incumbents ==
- Monarch: Albert II
- Minister of State (Monaco): Serge Telle

== Events ==
- The 2018 Monaco Grand Prix is held on 27 May 2018 at the Circuit de Monaco, a street circuit that runs through the Principality of Monaco. It was the 6th round of the 2018 FIA Formula One World Championship.
- The New National Museum of Monaco (NMNM) at Villa Paloma hosted an exhibition of works by American pop artist Tom Wesselmann.

== See also ==
- 2018 in Europe
- City states
