= 2026 in Monaco =

- Decades: 2000s; 2010s; 2020s
- See also: History of Monaco; List of years in Monaco

Events in the year 2026 in Monaco.

== Incumbents ==
- Monarch: Albert II
- Minister of State (Monaco): Christophe Mirmand

== Events ==
- 6–22 February – Monaco at the 2026 Winter Olympics
- 28 March – Pope Leo XIV holds a one-day visit to Monaco.
- 29 June – 2026 Monaco bombing – Three people, including Ukrainian businessman Vadym Iermolaiev, are injured in an explosion in a residential building.

== Holidays ==
- 1 January – New Year's Day
- 27 January – Saint Dévote's Day
- 6 April – Easter Monday
- 1 May – Labour Day
- 14 May – Ascension Day
- 25 May – Whit Monday
- 4 June – Corpus Christi
- 15 August – Assumption Day/ National Day
- 1 November – All Saints' Day
- 19 November – National Day
- 8 December – Immaculate Conception
- 25 December – Christmas Day

== Deaths ==
- 20 August – Cédric Sbirrazzuoli, 39, racing driver

== See also ==
- 2026 in Europe
- City states
