= 2008 in Monaco =

- Decades: 1980s; 1990s; 2000s; 2010s; 2020s
- See also: History of Monaco; List of years in Monaco

Events in the year 2008 in Monaco.

== Incumbents ==
- Monarch: Albert II
- State Minister: Jean-Paul Proust

== Events ==
- January 24–27 – 2008 Monte Carlo Rally is held.
- February 3 – 2008 Monegasque general election is held.
- May 10–11 – 2008 Historic Grand Prix of Monaco is held.
- May 25 – Lewis Hamilton won the 2008 Monaco Grand Prix.
- November 9 – 2008 World Music Awards is held and hosted by actor Jesse Metcalfe and singer Michelle Williams.
- December – Monaco scraps plans to expand into the sea through an ambitious land reclamation project, citing the international financial crisis and environmental concerns.

== See also ==
- 2008 in Europe
- City states
