= 2010 in Monaco =

- Decades: 1990s; 2000s; 2010s; 2020s
- See also: History of Monaco; List of years in Monaco

Events in the year 2010 in Monaco.

== Incumbents ==
- Monarch: Albert II
- State Minister: Jean-Paul Proust (1 May 2005 – 29 March 2010) and Michel Roger (29 March 2010 – 16 December 2015)

== Events ==
- 26 March – Jean-Paul Proust resigned as Minister of State of Monaco due to grave illness.
- 1–2 May – 2010 Historic Grand Prix of Monaco is held.
- 16 May – Mark Webber won the 2010 Monaco Grand Prix.

== Deaths ==
- 8 April – Former Minister of State Proust died in a hospital in Marseille. He was succeeded in the post by Michel Roger.

== See also ==
- 2010 in Europe
- City states
