= 2023 in Monaco =

- Decades: 2000s; 2010s; 2020s
- See also: History of Monaco; List of years in Monaco

Events in the year 2023 in Monaco.

== Incumbents ==
- Monarch: Albert II
- Minister of State (Monaco): Pierre Dartout

== Events ==
Ongoing – COVID-19 pandemic in Monaco

- 5 February: 2023 Monegasque general election
  - 28 May - Max Verstappen won the Monaco Grand Prix.

== See also ==
- COVID-19 pandemic in Europe
- City states
