= 2022 in Monaco =

- Decades: 2000s; 2010s; 2020s
- See also: History of Monaco; List of years in Monaco

Events in the year 2022 in Monaco.

== Incumbents ==
- Monarch: Albert II
- Minister of State (Monaco): Pierre Dartout

== Events ==
Ongoing – COVID-19 pandemic in Monaco

- 28 February – Despite having strong connections with Russian oligarchs, the nation announced the adoption of sanctions against Russia in line with current EU sanctions.
  - 29 May - Sergio Pérez won the Monaco Grand Prix.
- 22 July – The first case of Monkeypox was reported in the nation.

== See also ==
- COVID-19 pandemic in Europe
- City states
