= 2020 in Monaco =

- Decades: 2000s; 2010s; 2020s
- See also: History of Monaco; List of years in Monaco

Events in the year 2020 in Monaco.

== Incumbents ==
- Monarch: Albert II
- Minister of State (Monaco): Serge Telle (until 31 August); Pierre Dartout onwards

== Events ==
Ongoing – COVID-19 pandemic in Monaco

- 28 February – Monaco confirms its first case of COVID-19.
- 18 May – The office of Minister of State announces that Serge Telle will leave the Headship of the Monegasque government on 31 August.

== See also ==
- COVID-19 pandemic in Europe
- 2020 in the European Union
- City states
