= 2009 in Monaco =

- Decades: 1980s; 1990s; 2000s; 2010s; 2020s
- See also: History of Monaco; List of years in Monaco

The following lists events that happened in 2009 in Monaco.

== Incumbents ==
- Monarch: Albert II
- State Minister: Jean-Paul Proust

== Events ==
- January - Sebastian Ogier wins the 2009 Monte Carlo Rally, held on January 21st to the 24th, driving for BF Goodrich in a Peugeot 207 S2000.
- January/February - The 12th Historic Monte-Carlo Rally is held on the 30th of January to the 4th of February.
- March - EVER Monaco 2009, a trade show for ecological and renewable vehicles, is held on the 26th through to the 29th.
- March 28 – Chuck Berry performed during the Rose Ball in Monaco.
- May – OECD removes Monaco from blacklist of uncooperative tax havens.
- May 22 - Romain Grosjean wins the GP2 series 2009 Monaco feature race.
- May 23 - Pastor Maldonado wins the GP2 series 2009 Monaco sprint race, future F1 driver Nico Hulkenburg also finishes on the podium in 3rd place.
- May 24 – Jenson Button won the 2009 Monaco Grand Prix racing for Brawn GP. Also on this day Oliver Turvey won the 2009 Monaco Formula Renault 3.5 race.
- June – Monaco signed its twelfth Tax Information Exchange Agreement, meeting the OECD threshold for removal from the blacklist of uncooperative tax havens, and committed to implementing financial transparency reforms.
- July 4 - The 96th Tour De France starts in Monaco.
- July 28 - The Herculis Monaco 2009 was held in Stade Louis II, Fontvielle, with a reported attendance of 15,000.
- July – The Prince of Monaco, Albert II, attended the G8 summit in L’Aquila, Italy, where he spoke about climate change and rising sea levels, continuing his international advocacy for environmental protection.
- August – The Monte-Carlo Philharmonic Orchestra held its annual summer concert series at the Prince's Palace courtyard, drawing international audiences and featuring guest conductor Gianluigi Gelmetti.
- September - The 2009 Monaco Yacht Show was held in Port Hercules from the 23rd to the 26th of September. The show was attended by Prince Albert among others.
- November - The 2009 Monte-Carlo Gastronomy is held from the 27th to the 30th of November and was the 14th edition of the annual event.
- December – AS Monaco FC finished the first half of the 2009–10 Ligue 1 season mid-table, highlighted by victories over Paris Saint-Germain and Marseille, helping stabilise the club after difficult prior seasons.

== Deaths ==
- September 19th - Joseph-Marie Sardou, the former Roman Catholic Archdiocese of Monaco, passes away at age 87.

== See also ==
- City states
