= 2015 in Monaco =

- Decades: 1990s; 2000s; 2010s; 2020s
- See also: History of Monaco; List of years in Monaco

Events in the year 2015 in Monaco.

== Incumbents ==
- Monarch: Albert II
- State Minister: Michel Roger

== Events ==
- January – The twins Princess Gabriella and Prince Jacques were officially presented to the public on 7 January.
  - 24 May - Nico Rosberg won the Monaco Grand Prix.
- 25 July – The civil marriage of Pierre Casiraghi, nephew of the Sovereign Prince, and Beatrice Borromeo took place at the Palais Princier, attended by 700 guests and followed by a celebration in the garden of the palace.
- October – Charlotte Casiraghi, niece of the Sovereign Prince, launched Les Rencontres Philosophiques de Monaco, an intellectual 'think tank', discussion forum, and committee for awarding annual philosophy awards.

== Sports ==
- 2015 Monaco ePrix
- 2015 Monaco Grand Prix
- 2015 Monte-Carlo Rolex Masters
- 2015 Monte Carlo Rally

== Deaths ==
- 14 February – Michele Ferrero, Italian entrepreneur (born 1925)

== See also ==
- 2015 in Europe
- City states
