= Corruption in Monaco =

Corruption in Monaco still exists despite the principality's affluence and image as a haven for the wealthy. Problematic areas include challenges in maintaining transparency and integrity in governance structures.

== Corruption issues ==
According to a report by the Council of Europe's Group of States Against Corruption (GRECO), Monaco's existing anti-corruption frameworks have weaknesses. Particularly, these include the lack of consistency and inadequate requisite guarantees of integrity. The report, for instance, noted that there is a lack of transparency in the actions taken by all of the most senior posts in the executive, including the Sovereign Prince, currently Prince Albert II. This has been underscored because of the significant concentration of power on the executive branch, raising concerns about potential corruption at the highest echelons of Monaco's government. Potential corruption cases include conflict of interest, bribery, and misappropriation of public funds.

There is also the case of Serge Telle’s administration, which saw the emergence of several corruption challenges. One of the most notable was the controversy about the Monaco-based consultancy, Unaoil. The scandal about its corrupt practices came to light the same year Telle assumed office. The company was accused of engaging in bribery in order to secure contracts for multinational oil companies. The scandal implicated several high-profile individuals in Monaco and around the world.

Telle’s administration was criticized for its delayed response to the corruption allegations. His government only acted on it when the United Kingdom’s Serious Fraud Office flagged the case despite years of rumors about Unaoil corruption. When pressed why his administration failed to investigate in the past, Telle declared that “all these things are dormant. That’s the very principle of corruption — everything is very hidden until someone ends up revealing the facts.”

In 2020, months before Telle was replaced Pierre Dartout, GRECO released a report indicating Monaco's significant corruption challenges. These include the inability to prevent corruption among members of the parliament, judges, and prosecutors. Presently, there is no comprehensive code of conduct that governs officials such as members of the judiciary, which leads to potential abuse of power and other forms of graft and corruption.

== Anti-corruption measures ==
Monaco has implemented a number of anti-corruption initiatives and the most significant of these was instituted to comply with international standards and evaluations set by GRECO. Key measures include the establishment of anti-corruption regulations at different governmental levels. To ensure the prevention of corruption and adherence to ethical standards, a compliance officer and ethics committee have been appointed. The ethics committee oversees compliance as well as procedures that prevent conflict of interest that arise in the revolving door phenomenon. This is supplemented by other policies such as the introduction of Sovereign Order no. 9.931, which prescribes ethical conduct required from government members.

There is a challenge in assessing the impact of the Monaguesque anti-corruption since Monaco is not listed in the main corruption monitoring indices such as Transparency International's Corruption Perceptions Index and the World Bank’s Doing Business Rankings. The country, however, had placed 72nd out of 197 territories in RAND Corporation’s Business Bribery Risk Assessment for 2019.
