= 2014 in Monaco =

- Decades: 1990s; 2000s; 2010s; 2020s
- See also: History of Monaco; List of years in Monaco

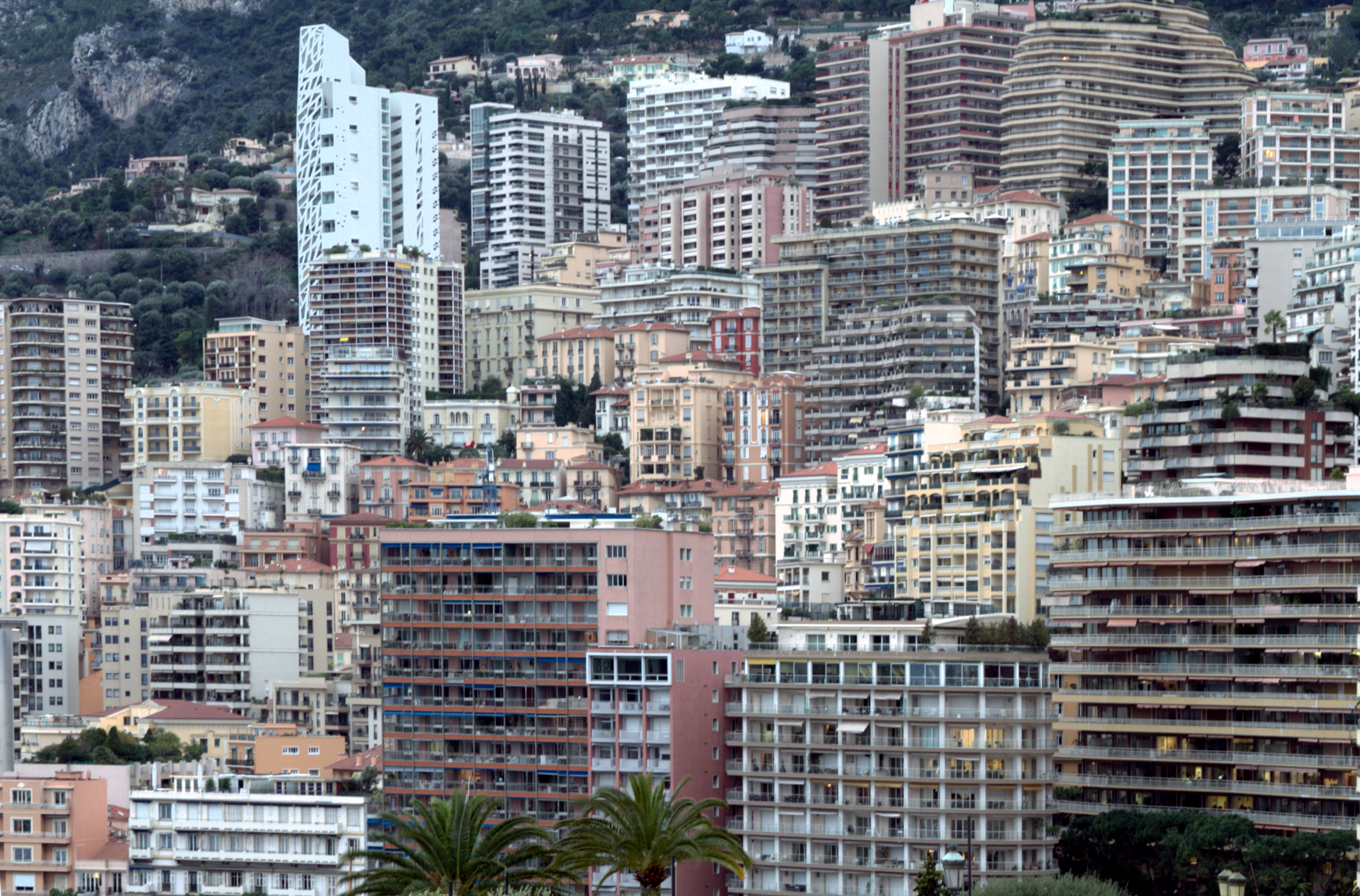
Balconies - Monaco 2014

Events in the year 2014 in Monaco.

== Incumbents ==
- Monarch: Albert II
- State Minister: Michel Roger

== Events ==
- January – AS Monaco FC was victorious in three rounds of the Coupe de France, then defeating RC Lens in the quarter-finals, but ultimately losing to En Avant de Guingamp in the semi-finals.
- 6 May – Hélène Pastor, a Monegasque billionaire real estate businesswoman and the richest woman in the principality, is assassinated in Nice, France. Pastor died of her injuries on May 21.
  - 25 May - Nico Rosberg won the Monaco Grand Prix.
- 10 December – Charlene, Princess of Monaco, wife of Albert II, Prince of Monaco, gives birth to twins Jacques and Gabriella. Jacques will be heir apparent in line with male priority of Monaco's succession laws.

== See also ==
- 2014 in Europe
- City states
