= 2013 in Monaco =

- Decades: 1990s; 2000s; 2010s; 2020s
- See also: History of Monaco; List of years in Monaco

Events in the year 2013 in Monaco.

== Incumbents ==
- Monarch: Albert II
- State Minister: Michel Roger

== Events ==
=== January to June ===
- 20 January – Sébastien Loeb won the Monte Carlo Rally.
- 10 February – Following the general election, Horizon Monaco, a conservative political coalition, won the majority of seats in the National Council.
- 21 April – Novak Djokovic defeated eight-time defending champion Rafael Nadal in the 2013 Monte-Carlo Rolex Masters.
- 25 May – Stefano Coletti won the final race of the 2013 Monaco GP2 Series round.
- 26 May – Nico Rosberg won the 2013 Monaco Grand Prix.
- 9–13 June – The Monte-Carlo Television Festival was held, with awards going to Bryan Cranston, Ty Burrell, Ivan Trojan, Sofie Gråbøl, Julieta Cardinali, Tina Fey, Christine Neubauer, Niall McCormick, etc. See full list: Monte-Carlo TV Festival at IMDb

=== July to December ===
- 31 August – Andrea Casiraghi, nephew of the Sovereign Prince, civilly married Tatiana Santo Domingo.
- September – Prince Albert II visited Cody, Wyoming in a symbolic gesture to mark the centennial of the visit to the same by his great-great-grandfather Prince Albert I.
- 30 October – AS Monaco FC made it to the third round of Coupe de la Ligue, playing against and losing to Stade de Reims, 1–0.

== See also ==
- 2013 in Europe
- City states
