= 2012 in Monaco =

- Decades: 1990s; 2000s; 2010s; 2020s
- See also: History of Monaco; List of years in Monaco

Events in the year 2012 in Monaco.

== Incumbents ==
- Monarch: Albert II
- State Minister: Michel Roger

== Events ==
=== January to June ===
- 29 January – Pauline Ducruet, niece of the Sovereign Prince, launched the 1st edition of the New Generation Circus Festival of Monte Carlo, an offshoot of the International Circus Festival of Monte-Carlo meant for people under the age of 20.
- 27 May – Mark Webber won the 2012 Monaco Grand Prix.

== See also ==
- 2012 in Europe
- City states
