= 2021 in Monaco =

- Decades: 2000s; 2010s; 2020s
- See also: History of Monaco; List of years in Monaco

Events in the year 2021 in Monaco.

== Incumbents ==
- Monarch: Albert II
- Minister of State (Monaco): Pierre Dartout

== Events ==
Ongoing – COVID-19 pandemic in Monaco

- 21–24 January – 2021 Monte Carlo Rally.
- 14 September – Raphaël Domjan became the first pilot of an electric plane flight with a head of state. They took off with a Pipistrel Velis128 operated by Elektropostal from Nice airport in France with Albert II and they flew over Monaco. The plane flew for 30 minutes at a maximum altitude of 900 feet.
  - 23 May - Max Verstappen won the Monaco Grand Prix.

== See also ==
- COVID-19 pandemic in Europe
- 2021 in the European Union
- City states
