= 2024 in Monaco =

- Decades: 2000s; 2010s; 2020s
- See also: History of Monaco; List of years in Monaco

Events in the year 2024 in Monaco.

== Incumbents ==
- Monarch: Albert II
- Minister of State (Monaco): Pierre Dartout (until 2 September); Didier Guillaume (2 September onwards)

== Events ==
- 28 June - The Financial Action Task Force adds Monaco to its "gray list" of countries not fully complying with measures to combat money laundering and terrorism financing.
- 2 September - Didier Guillaume is appointed Minister of State of Monaco.

== Holidays ==
- 1 January - New Year's Day
- 27 January - Saint Dévote's Day
- 1 April - Easter Monday
- 1 May - Labour Day
- 9 May - Ascension Day
- 20 May - Whit Monday
- 30 May - Corpus Christi
- 15 August - Assumption Day/ National Day
- 1 November - All Saints' Day
- 19 November - National Day
- 8 December – Immaculate Conception
- 25 December - Christmas Day

== See also ==
- City states
