= 2011 in Monaco =

- Decades: 1990s; 2000s; 2010s; 2020s
- See also: History of Monaco; List of years in Monaco

Events in the year 2011 in Monaco.

== Incumbents ==
- Sovereign Prince: Albert II
- Minister of State: Michel Roger

== Events ==
- 26-29 May - Circuit de Monaco, Round 6 of the 2011 FIA Formula 1 World Championship was won by Sebastian Vettel, he was driving the Red Bull-Renault RB7 and finished 78 laps in 2:09:38.373
- 26 June - Rumours circulate around a runaway bride in Charlene Wittstock attempting to flee Monaco before her marriage to Albert II.
- 1 July - The Wedding of Albert II, Prince of Monaco, and Charlene Wittstock. The religious ceremony is attended by 40 heads of state, including European royalty.
- 2 July - 7,000 citizens are invited to post-ceremony cocktails, followed by a Jean Michel Jarre concert.
- 21 September - The Monaco Yacht Show 2011 takes place, showcasing industry growth and optimism. Notable names were on display, including Seven Seas, Lady Britt, Galileo G, Fidelis, Cakewalk, Big Fish, Satori, and the 134m Serene at anchor.

== Deaths ==
- 18 March – Princess Antoinette of Monaco died, age 90.
