= 2017 in Monaco =

- Decades: 1990s; 2000s; 2010s; 2020s
- See also: History of Monaco; List of years in Monaco

Events in the year 2017 in Monaco.

== Incumbents ==
- Monarch: Albert II
- Minister of State (Monaco): Serge Telle

== Events ==
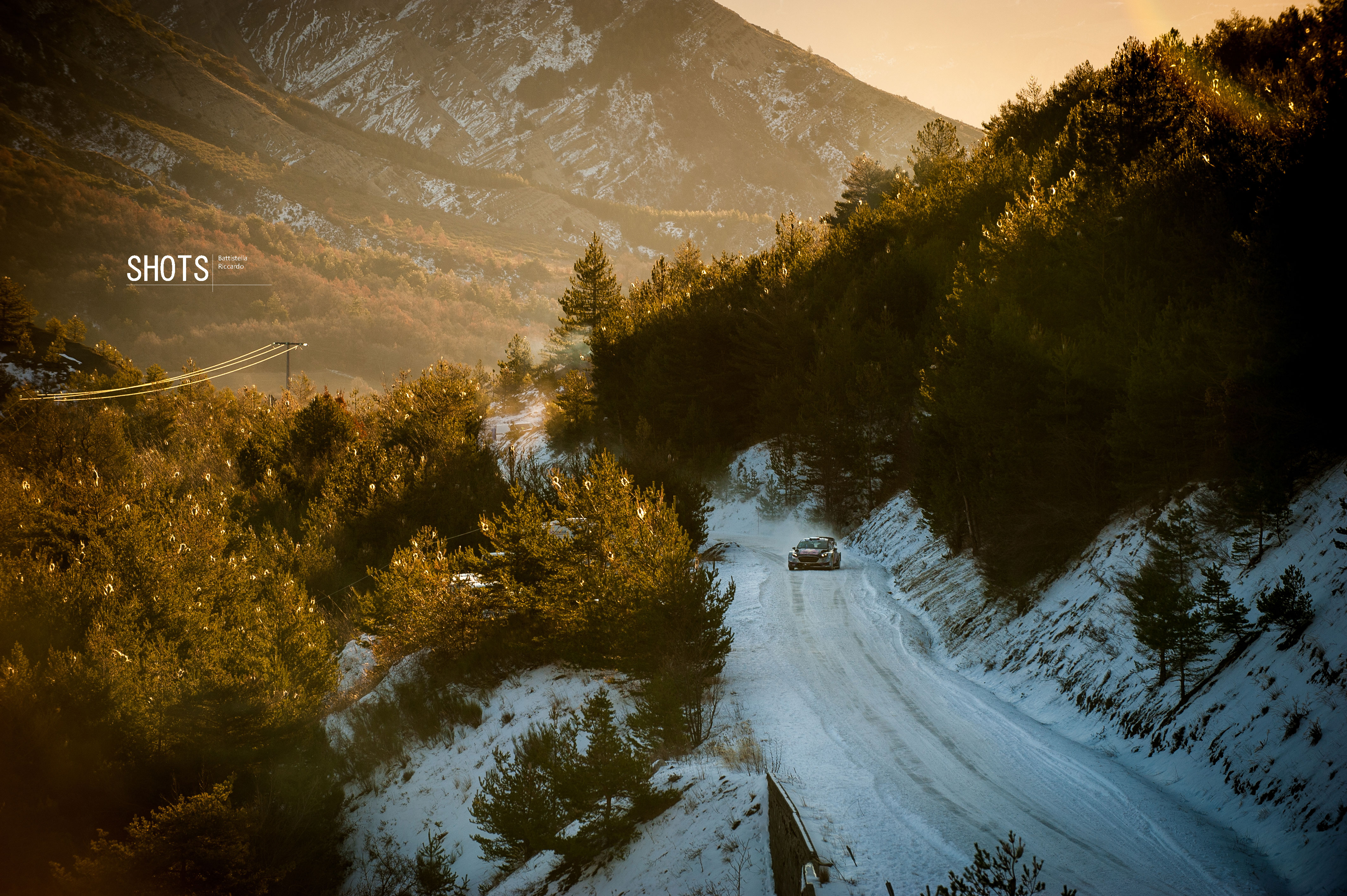
Sébastien Ogier during the 2017 Monte Carlo Rally.

- 19–22 January – The 2017 Monte Carlo Rally was held in Monaco over four days, the first round of the 2017 World Rally Championship. Sébastien Ogier was the overall winner.
  - 28 May - Sebastian Vettel won the Monaco Grand Prix.

== See also ==
- 2017 in Europe
- City states
