= 2016 in Monaco =

- Decades: 1990s; 2000s; 2010s; 2020s
- See also: History of Monaco; List of years in Monaco

Events in the year 2016 in Monaco.

== Incumbents ==
- Monarch: Albert II
- Minister of State: Gilles Tonelli (acting) (until 1 February), Serge Telle (starting 1 February)

== Events ==
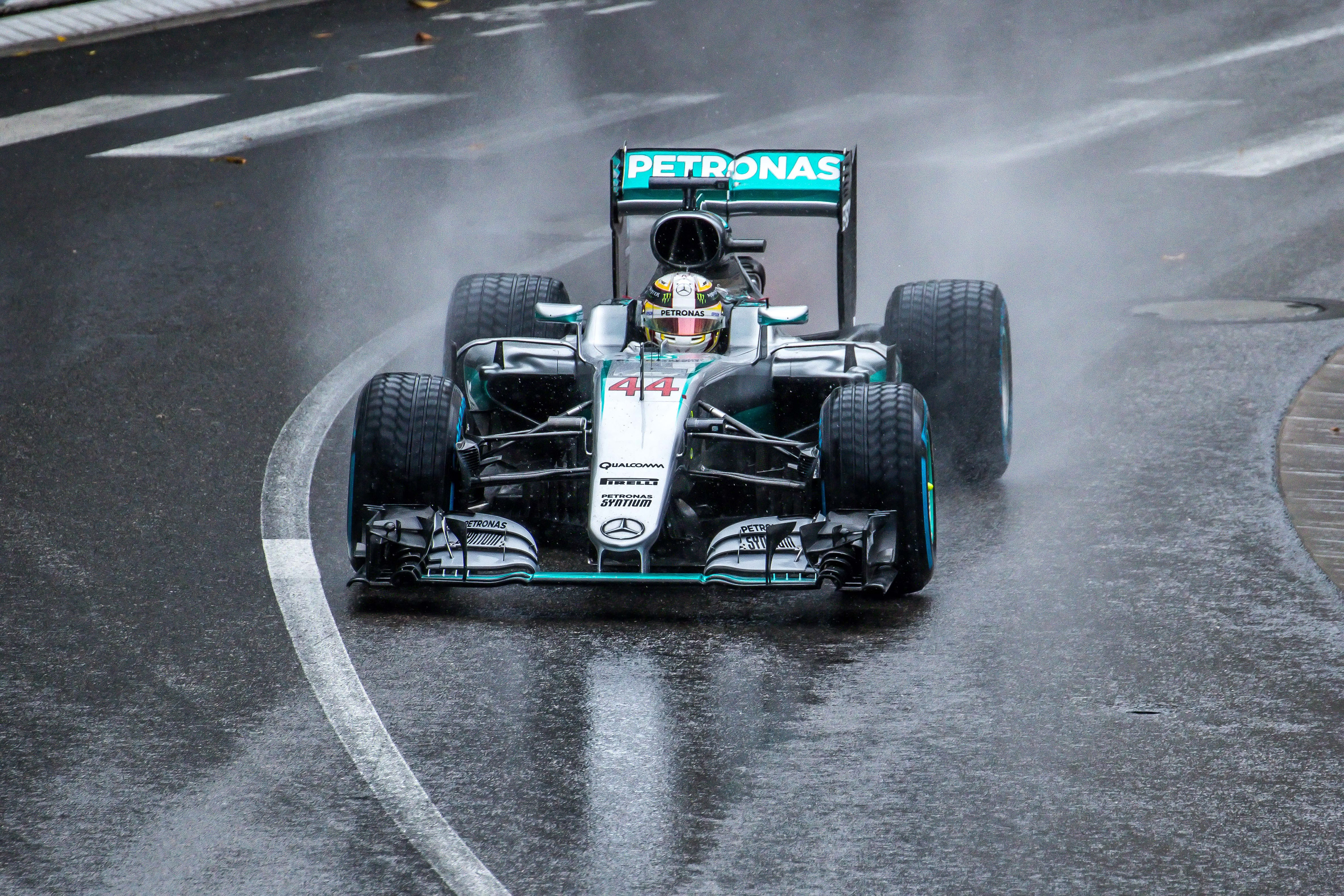
Winner of the 2016 Monaco Grand Prix was Lewis Hamilton for Mercedes

- 21–24 January – the 2016 Monte Carlo Rally, a motor racing event for rally cars, was held in Monaco over four days, the first round of the 2016 World Rally Championship.
- 10–17 April – the 2016 Monte-Carlo Rolex Masters, a tennis tournament for male professional players.
- 29 May – Lewis Hamilton won the 2016 Monaco Grand Prix.
- 1 June – 15,000 2-euro commemorative coins were released into circulation marking the 150th anniversary of the foundation of Monte Carlo by Charles III, Prince of Monaco.
- 18–19 June – The 2016 Men's Rugby Sevens Final Olympic Qualification Tournament was held at Stade Louis II in Fontvieille.
- 5–21 August – Monaco at the 2016 Summer Olympics: 3 competitors in 3 sports (athletics, gymnastics and judo).

== See also ==
- 2016 in Europe
- City states
