= 2025 in Monaco =

- Decades: 2000s; 2010s; 2020s
- See also: History of Monaco; List of years in Monaco

Events in the year 2025 in Monaco.

== Incumbents ==
- Monarch: Albert II
- Minister of State (Monaco): Didier Guillaume (until 17 January); Isabelle Berro-Amadeï (acting, 17 January–21 July), Christophe Mirmand (from 21 July)

== Events ==
- 17 January: Minister of state Didier Guillaume dies following an illness.
- 10 June: The European Union adds Monaco to its list of high risk jurisdictions for money laundering and terrorism financing.
- 22 September: Monaco formally recognizes the State of Palestine.

== Holidays ==
- 1 January – New Year's Day
- 27 January – Saint Dévote's Day
- 21 April – Easter Monday
- 1 May – Labour Day
- 29 May – Ascension Day
- 9 June – Whit Monday
- 19 June – Corpus Christi
- 15 August – Assumption Day/ National Day
- 1 November – All Saints' Day
- 19 November – National Day
- 8 December – Immaculate Conception
- 25 December – Christmas Day

== See also ==
- 2025 in Europe
- City states
