= 2019 in Monaco =

- Decades: 1990s; 2000s; 2010s; 2020s
- See also: History of Monaco; List of years in Monaco

Events in the year 2019 in Monaco.

== Incumbents ==
- Monarch: Albert II
- Minister of State (Monaco): Serge Telle

== Events ==
- 17 March – 2019 Monegasque municipal elections
- 26 May – 2019 Monaco Grand Prix
- 27 September – At the U.N. General Assembly 74th session, North Macedonia established diplomatic relations with a number of countries, including Monaco.

== See also ==
- COVID-19 pandemic in Europe
- 2019 in the European Union
- City states
