= 2009 Monaco Grand Prix =

Coordinates: 43°44′4.74″N 7°25′16.8″E

Race 6 of 17 in the 2009 Formula One World Championship
← Previous race	Next race →
- Circuit de Monaco

Race details
- Date: 24 May 2009
- Official name: Formula 1 Grand Prix de Monaco 2009
- Location: Circuit de Monaco
- Course: Street circuit
- Course length: 3.34 km (2.08 miles)
- Distance: 78 laps, 260.52 km (162.24 miles)
- Weather: Sunny

Pole position
Driver	(United Kingdom) Jenson Button	Brawn-Mercedes
- Time: 1:14.902

Fastest lap
Driver	(Brazil) Felipe Massa	Ferrari
- Time: 1:15.154 on lap 50

Podium
First	(United Kingdom) Jenson Button	Brawn-Mercedes
Second	(Brazil) Rubens Barrichello	Brawn-Mercedes
Third	(Finland) Kimi Räikkönen	Ferrari

The 2009 Monaco Grand Prix (officially the Formula 1 Grand Prix de Monaco 2009) was a Formula One motor race that was held on 24 May 2009 at the Circuit de Monaco, in Monaco. The race, which was contested over 78 laps, was the sixth round of the 2009 Formula One season. It was won by Brawn GP driver Jenson Button, with his teammate Rubens Barrichello second, and Ferrari's Kimi Räikkönen third.

This year a peace and sport initiative was introduced on this Grand Prix under the High Patronage of Albert II, Prince of Monaco. Sébastien Bourdais scored his last world championship points at this race.

== Report ==
=== Background ===
The first five races of the championship ended with Brawn driver Jenson Button leading the Drivers Championship by 14 points from teammate Rubens Barrichello, having claimed 41 points out of a possible 45. Their Brawn GP team was leading the Constructors Championship with 68 points; second-placed Red Bull had 38.5, with their driver Sebastian Vettel third place in the drivers championship. Reigning World Champion Lewis Hamilton of McLaren was only in seventh place, having accumulated nine points.

Red Bull had a new two-tier diffuser ready for their RB5 car in Monaco, with chief designer Adrian Newey believing it could be a real benefit to the team. The Austrian drinks company team had won the 2009 Chinese Grand Prix . They had finished third and fourth in the previous race at Barcelona. Force India had prepared several important upgrades for the VJM-02, focused upon giving high downforce by modifying the front and rear wings. This was to improve performance to score their first points, having not scored points before in a Formula One race. Most other teams, including Toyota and BMW Sauber, had modified cars to give good downforce and high mechanical grip; important for the Monaco circuit's low speed and twisting, slow corners.

In the run up to the race, Ferrari issued a statement declaring that "Ferrari does not intend to enter its cars in the next Formula One World Championship." if "the introduction of two different sets of regulations based on arbitrary technical rules and economic parameters." were to take place. This was in reference to proposed regulations by the FIA World Motor Sport Council to introduce a Budget Cap for 2010, and allow technical freedom to those teams operating under it. The Renault Formula One team made a similar statement, announcing "If the decisions announced by the World Council on the 29th of April 2009 are not revised, we have no choice but to withdraw from the FIA Formula One World Championship at the end of 2009." These statements were the start of the FIA–FOTA dispute over the 2010 regulations. During the event, scenes for the 2010 film Iron Man 2 were shot, which features a historic Monaco Grand Prix race. Prior to the race the drivers complained about a billboard for Martini featuring model Jessiqa Pace was distracting and in the line of sight of drivers as they exit Loews hairpin.

=== Practice and qualifying ===
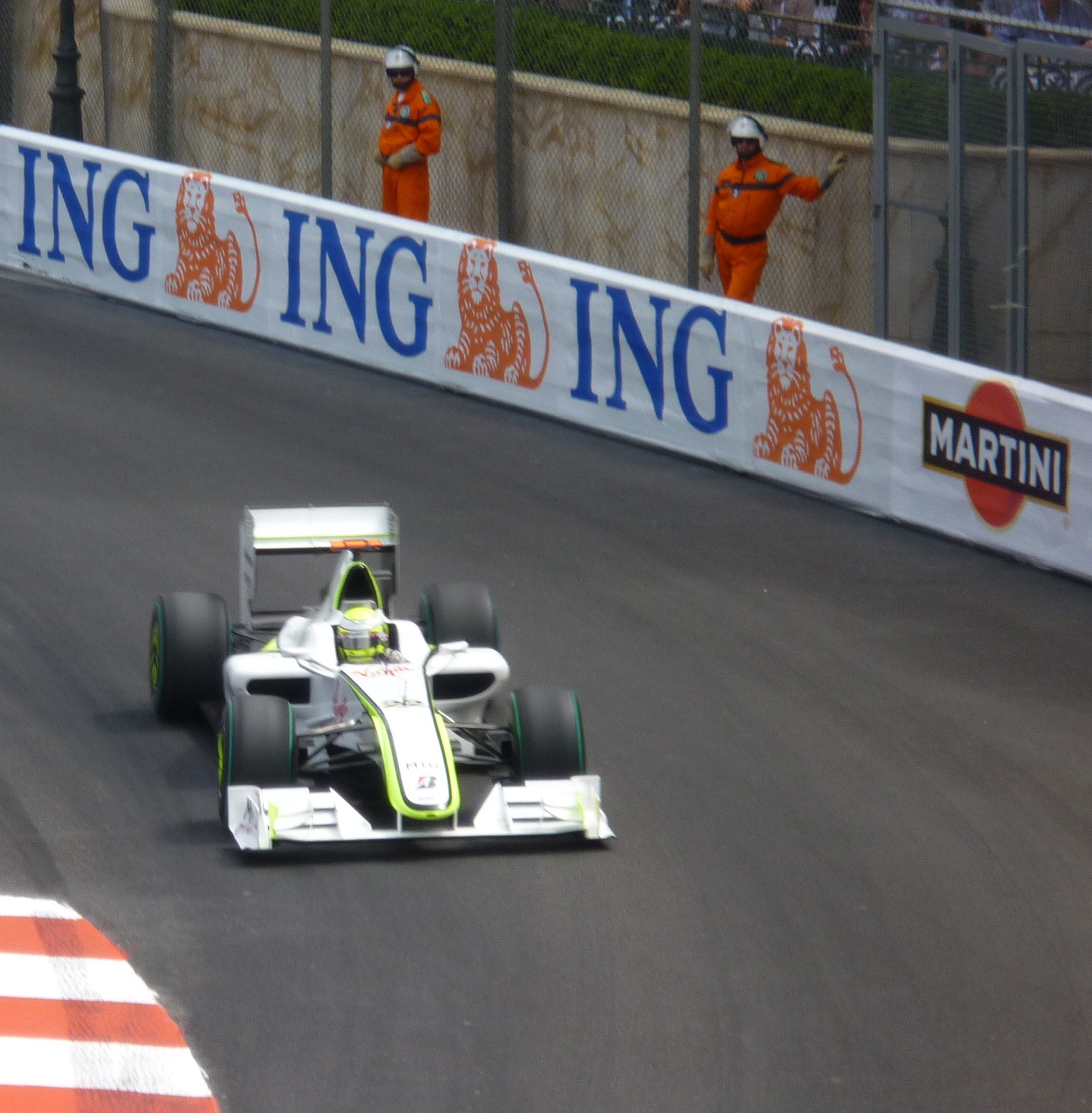
Jenson Button took pole position and won the race, extending his championship lead.

The early practice sessions at Monaco are traditionally run on the Thursday of the week so that the roads can be opened on the Friday for public access. As such, two practice sessions were held on the Thursday, with the third on Saturday morning, followed shortly by qualifying.

The Thursday practice sessions began with Brawn GP establishing its dominance once again; Rubens Barrichello was fastest by three-tenths of a second from countryman Felipe Massa with a time of 1:17.199, and the two McLarens of Lewis Hamilton and Heikki Kovalainen following shortly thereafter. The Brawns continued their form in the second session, placing third and fourth behind Nico Rosberg – who topped practice for the ninth time this season with a 1:15.243 – and Hamilton once again. A similar story held true for the Saturday session, with Jenson Button narrowly being beaten by Fernando Alonso in the Renault.

The first qualifying session was marked by 2008 winner Lewis Hamilton crashing at Mirabeau and damaging his suspension, putting him out of qualifying and gradually knocking him down the order until he would finish sixteenth, ahead of the BMW Saubers of Nick Heidfeld and Robert Kubica and the Toyotas of Jarno Trulli and Timo Glock. The second session saw the departure of the two Force Indias, both Toro Rossos and Nelson Piquet Jr.'s Renault while Finland's Kimi Räikkönen and Heikki Kovalainen topped the timing sheets. Giancarlo Fisichella had two times disallowed for cutting the corners at the Swimming Pool Complex and Nouvelle Chicane. The third and final session was dominated by Rubens Barrichello and Sebastian Vettel until a late lap from Jenson Button saw the championship leader take his fourth pole from six starts this season with Kimi Räikkönen the highest-placed KERS-equipped car in second place.

=== Race ===
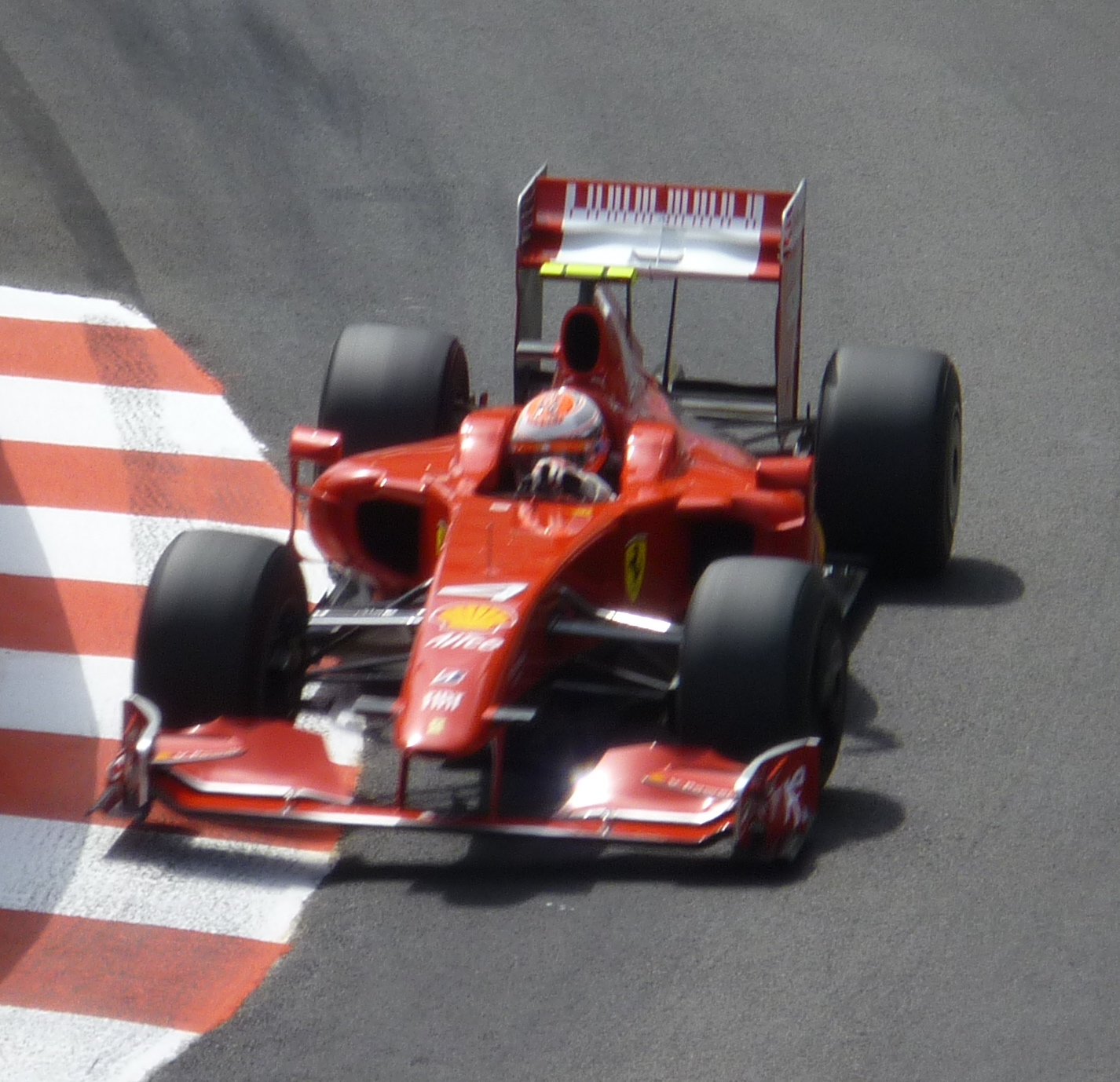
Kimi Räikkönen took Ferrari's first podium finish of 2009.

At the start, Button maintained his lead as Barrichello passed Räikkönen on the approach to the first corner. Both Brawn cars and Sebastian Vettel started the race on the super-soft tyres; the Ferraris and Williams started on the soft compound. This provided an advantage, as the super-soft tyres – which had proven to be the better of the two all weekend – started to lose grip drastically after twelve laps as championship contender Sebastian Vettel proved when he started losing up to four seconds per lap on leader Button, because of the difficulty in overtaking at Monaco, this greatly helped the Brawn GP drivers and Kimi Räikkönen (the only three drivers ahead of Vettel when his tyres started to lose grip), because for several minutes all cars behind him found themselves unable to overtake, opening a huge gap between third and fourth, even for several laps after Vettel had been overtaken.

Sébastien Buemi had an accident running into Nelson Piquet Jr. on lap 10 during a passing attempt at Sainte Devote, while Vettel slid into the barriers under brakes at the same spot several laps later. Button maintained a fifteen-second lead over teammate Barrichello for most of the race, who had a smaller gap over the Ferraris of Kimi Räikkönen and Felipe Massa; Massa raised the ire of the stewards after crossing the chicane at the Swimming Pool Complex twice, though no penalty was awarded as both occasions were due to driver error.

In the late stages of the race, Heikki Kovalainen crashed out at the Swimming Pool, spinning and colliding with the barriers. Kazuki Nakajima also crashed out on the last lap of the race at Mirabeau. Robert Kubica was the only other retirement, his race ending with brake problems. In the final phase of the race, the Ferraris pitted for the super-soft tyres, discovering the same graining problem as everyone else over longer stints. The distance between Button and Barrichello halved over the final few laps, though Button was deliberately slowing to avoid encountering backmarkers who were fighting for position. He won by seven-and-a-half seconds from Barrichello, with the Ferraris of Räikkönen and Massa third and fourth.

After the end of the race, Button mistakenly parked his car in parc fermé in the pit lane as is normal for other Grands Prix, rather than on the main straight with the other two podium finishers as is the norm for Monaco. As a result, he had to run down the start/finish straight to the podium.

With his win, Button scored the third-best start to a season in Formula One history, with five victories and one third place. Only Nigel Mansell in 1992 and Michael Schumacher in 1994 recorded better starts, with each taking five victories and one second place in the first six rounds. Also, his victory in the Brawn-Mercedes marked the first time in modern F1 history that a single engine has won three races in a row – engines in the 1950s lasted most of a season, sometimes more than one season. It was also the first time since 2006 that a driver had won three races in succession. Michael Schumacher was the last to do so, as he won the United States, French and German Grands Prix.

== Classification ==
Cars that used KERS are marked with "‡"

=== Qualifying ===
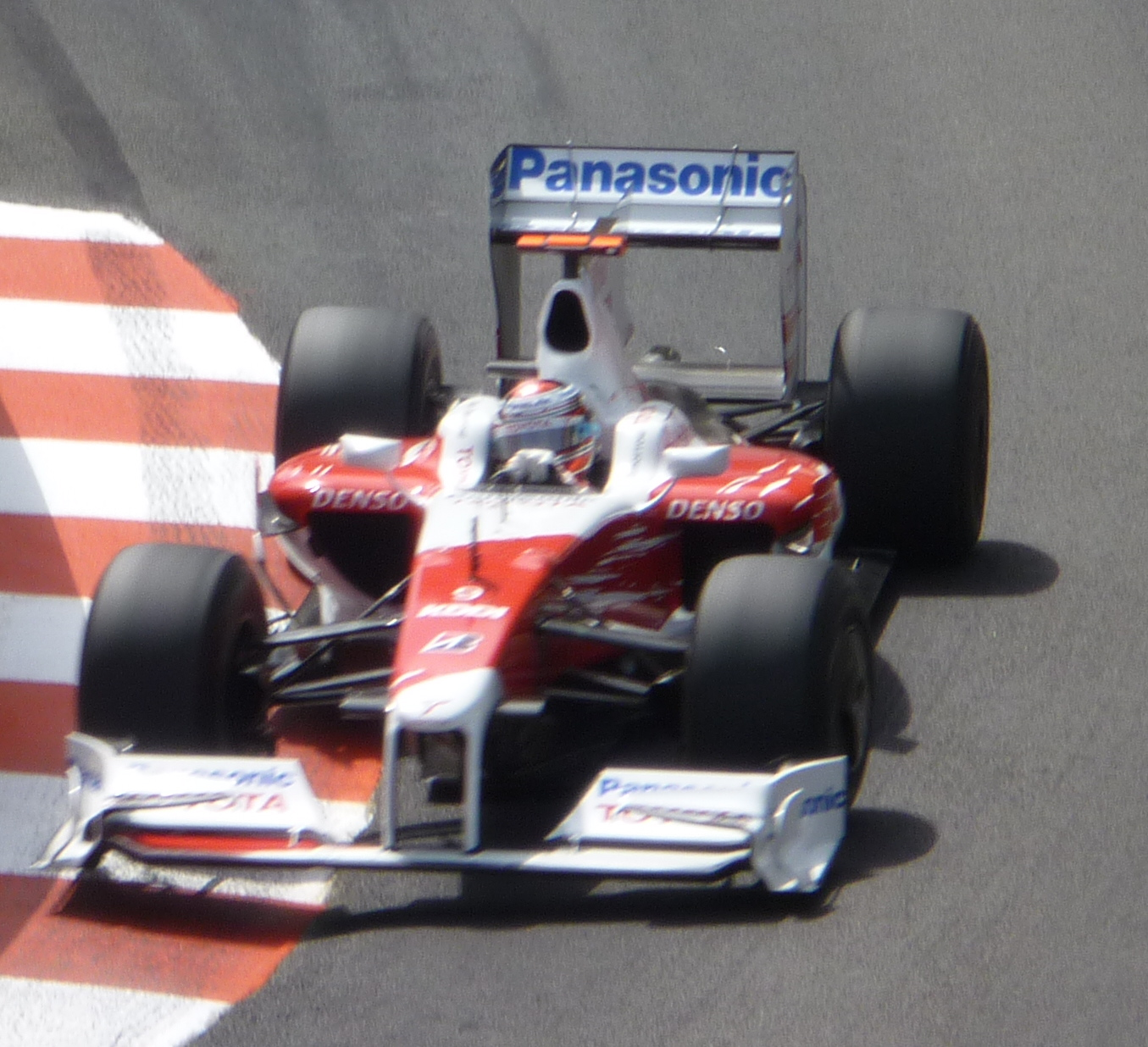
The Toyota team endured one of the worst weekends of its time in Formula One. Jarno Trulli (pictured) and Timo Glock set the two slowest qualifying times.

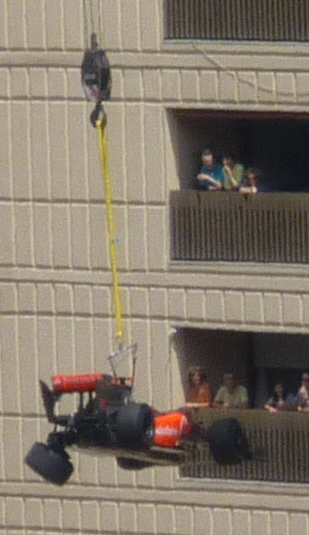
Lewis Hamilton crashed his car in the first part of qualifying, restricting himself to nineteenth position on the grid after a penalty.

Pos	No	Driver	Constructor	Part 1	Part 2	Part 3	Grid
1	22	(United Kingdom) Jenson Button	Brawn-Mercedes	1:15.210	1:15.016	1:14.902	1
2	4‡	(Finland) Kimi Räikkönen	Ferrari	1:15.746	1:14.514	1:14.927	2
3	23	(Brazil) Rubens Barrichello	Brawn-Mercedes	1:15.425	1:14.829	1:15.077	3
4	15	(Germany) Sebastian Vettel	Red Bull-Renault	1:15.915	1:14.879	1:15.271	4
5	3‡	(Brazil) Felipe Massa	Ferrari	1:15.340	1:15.001	1:15.437	5
6	16	(Germany) Nico Rosberg	Williams-Toyota	1:15.094	1:14.846	1:15.455	6
7	2‡	(Finland) Heikki Kovalainen	McLaren-Mercedes	1:15.495	1:14.809	1:15.516	7
8	14	(Australia) Mark Webber	Red Bull-Renault	1:15.260	1:14.825	1:15.653	8
9	7	(Spain) Fernando Alonso	Renault	1:15.898	1:15.200	1:16.009	9
10	17	(Japan) Kazuki Nakajima	Williams-Toyota	1:15.930	1:15.579	1:17.344	10
11	12	(Switzerland) Sébastien Buemi	Toro Rosso-Ferrari	1:15.834	1:15.833		11
12	8	(Brazil) Nelson Piquet Jr.	Renault	1:16.013	1:15.837		12
13	21	(Italy) Giancarlo Fisichella	Force India-Mercedes	1:16.063	1:16.146		13
14	11	(France) Sébastien Bourdais	Toro Rosso-Ferrari	1:16.120	1:16.281		14
15	20	(Germany) Adrian Sutil	Force India-Mercedes	1:16.248	1:16.545		15
16	1‡	(United Kingdom) Lewis Hamilton	McLaren-Mercedes	1:16.264			19
17	6	(Germany) Nick Heidfeld	BMW Sauber	1:16.264			16
18	5	(Poland) Robert Kubica	BMW Sauber	1:16.405			17
19	9	(Italy) Jarno Trulli	Toyota	1:16.584			18
20	10	(Germany) Timo Glock	Toyota	1:16.788			20

- ^1 Lewis Hamilton was given a five place grid penalty for an unscheduled gearbox change following the qualifying session, as per the sporting regulations.
- ^2 Timo Glock had to start from the pit lane following modifications in the car between the qualifying and the race.

=== Race ===
Pos	No	Driver	Constructor	Laps	Time/Retired	Grid	Points
1	22	(United Kingdom) Jenson Button	Brawn-Mercedes	78	1:40:44.282	1	10
2	23	(Brazil) Rubens Barrichello	Brawn-Mercedes	78	+7.666	3	8
3	4	(Finland) Kimi Räikkönen	Ferrari	78	+13.442	2	6
4	3	(Brazil) Felipe Massa	Ferrari	78	+15.110	5	5
5	14	(Australia) Mark Webber	Red Bull-Renault	78	+15.730	8	4
6	16	(Germany) Nico Rosberg	Williams-Toyota	78	+33.586	6	3
7	7	(Spain) Fernando Alonso	Renault	78	+37.839	9	2
8	11	(France) Sébastien Bourdais	Toro Rosso-Ferrari	78	+1:03.142	14	1
9	21	(Italy) Giancarlo Fisichella	Force India-Mercedes	78	+1:05.040	13	
10	10	(Germany) Timo Glock	Toyota	77	+1 lap	20	
11	6	(Germany) Nick Heidfeld	BMW Sauber	77	+1 lap	16	
12	1	(United Kingdom) Lewis Hamilton	McLaren-Mercedes	77	+1 lap	19	
13	9	(Italy) Jarno Trulli	Toyota	77	+1 lap	18	
14	20	(Germany) Adrian Sutil	Force India-Mercedes	77	+1 lap	15	
15	17	(Japan) Kazuki Nakajima	Williams-Toyota	76	Accident	10	
Ret	2	(Finland) Heikki Kovalainen	McLaren-Mercedes	51	Accident	7	
Ret	5	(Poland) Robert Kubica	BMW Sauber	28	Brakes	17	
Ret	15	(Germany) Sebastian Vettel	Red Bull-Renault	15	Accident	4	
Ret	8	(Brazil) Nelson Piquet Jr.	Renault	10	Collision	12	
Ret	12	(Switzerland) Sébastien Buemi	Toro Rosso-Ferrari	10	Collision	11	

== Championship standings after the race ==
Drivers' Championship standings

Pos.	Driver	Points
1	(United Kingdom) Jenson Button	51
2	(Brazil) Rubens Barrichello	35
3	(Germany) Sebastian Vettel	23
4	(Australia) Mark Webber	19.5
5	(Italy) Jarno Trulli	14.5

Constructors' Championship standings

	Pos.	Constructor	Points
	1	(United Kingdom) Brawn-Mercedes	86
	2	(Austria) Red Bull-Renault	42.5
	3	(Japan) Toyota	26.5
3	4	(Italy) Ferrari	17
1	5	(United Kingdom) McLaren-Mercedes	13

- Note: Only the top five positions are included for both sets of standings.

== See also ==
- 2009 Monaco GP2 Series round

Previous race: 2009 Spanish Grand Prix	FIA Formula One World Championship; 2009 season	Next race: 2009 Turkish Grand Prix
Previous race: 2008 Monaco Grand Prix	Monaco Grand Prix	Next race: 2010 Monaco Grand Prix
