= 2008 in Europe =

The following is a list of events of the year 2008 in Europe.

== Events ==
=== Albania ===
(Albania)

=== Andorra ===
(Andorra)

=== Azerbaijan ===
(Azerbaijan)

=== Belarus ===
(Belarus)

=== Belgium ===
(Belgium)

=== Bosnia and Herzegovina ===
(Bosnia and Herzegovina)

=== Bulgaria ===
(Bulgaria)

=== Croatia ===
(Croatia)

=== Czech Republic ===
(Czech Republic)

=== Cyprus ===
(Cyprus)

=== Denmark ===
(Denmark)

=== Estonia ===
(Estonia)

=== European Union ===
- President of the European Commission: José Manuel Barroso
- President of the Parliament: Hans-Gert Pöttering
- President of the European Council:
  - Janez Janša (January–June)
  - Nicolas Sarkozy (July–December)
- Presidency of the Council of the EU:
  - Slovenia (January–July)
  - France (July–December)

=== Finland ===
(Finland)

=== France ===
(France)

=== Germany ===
(Germany)

=== Georgia ===
(Georgia (country))

=== Greece ===
(Greece)

=== Hungary ===
(Hungary)

=== Iceland ===
(Iceland)

=== Ireland ===
(Republic of Ireland)

=== Italy ===
(Italy)

=== Latvia ===
(Latvia)

=== Liechtenstein ===
(Liechtenstein)

=== Lithuania ===
(Lithuania)

=== Luxembourg ===
(Luxembourg)

=== Malta ===
(Malta)

=== Moldova ===
(Moldova)

=== Monaco ===
(Monaco)

=== Montenegro ===
(Montenegro)

=== Netherlands ===
(Netherlands)

=== North Macedonia ===
(North Macedonia)

=== Norway ===
(Norway)

=== Poland ===
(Poland)

=== Portugal ===
(Portugal)

=== Romania ===
(Romania)

=== Russia ===
(Russia)

=== San Marino ===
(San Marino)

=== Serbia ===
(Serbia)

=== Slovakia ===
(Slovakia)

=== Slovenia ===
(Slovenia)

=== Spain ===
(Spain)

=== Sweden ===
(Sweden)

=== Switzerland ===
(Switzerland)

=== Turkey ===
(Turkey)

=== Ukraine ===
(Ukraine)

=== United Kingdom ===
(United Kingdom)

=== Vatican City ===
(Vatican City)

== Events ==
- January 1: Cyprus and Malta becomes a eurozone member, adopting the euro for the first time.
- May 21: The first all-English European Cup final saw Manchester United beat Chelsea on penalties after a 1–1 draw in Moscow's Luzhniki Stadium.
- August 7–16: Russo-Georgian War
- August 28: The Russian group Voina staged the Fuck for the heir Puppy Bear! performance at the Timiryazev State Biological Museum in Moscow to protest at the election of Dmitry Medvedev in the 2008 Russian presidential election.
- December 6: A police officer assassinated 15-year-old student Alexis Grigoropoulos. Large riots took place the following days in Greece.

== Deaths ==
=== January ===
- January 2
  - George MacDonald Fraser, British author
  - Günter Schubert, German actor
- January 3
  - Jimmy Stewart, British racing driver
  - Werner Dollinger, German politician
- January 7 – Detlef Kraus, German pianist
- January 9 – John Harvey-Jones, British businessman
- January 19 – Morris Maddocks, British bishop
- January 30 – Jeremy Beadle, British television presenter, writer and producer

=== February ===
- 28 February – Mike Smith, British singer

=== March ===
- 8 March – Carol Barnes, British newsreader
- 18 March – Anthony Minghella, British film director
- 19 March
  - Arthur C. Clarke, British science fiction author and inventor
  - Paul Scofield, British actor
- 20 March – Brian Wilde, British actor
- 23 March – Neil Aspinall, British record producer and business executive
- 28 March – Michael Podro, British art historian

=== April ===
- 1 April – Jim Finney, British football referee
- 7 April – Mark Speight, British television presenter
- 25 April – Humphrey Lyttelton, British jazz musician and broadcaster

=== May ===
- 16 May – David Mitton, British producer and director
- 24 May – Rob Knox, British actor
- 28 May – Beryl Cook, British artist

=== July ===
- 2 July – Elizabeth Spriggs, British actress
- 3 July – Clive Hornby, British actor
- 4 July – Charles Wheeler, British journalist
- 14 July – Hugh Lloyd, British actor

=== August ===
- 11 August – Bill Cotton, British producer
- 29 August – Geoffrey Perkins, British comedy producer, writer and performer
- 31 August – Ken Campbell, British actor and raconteur

=== September ===
- 15 September – Richard Wright, British musician
- 24 September - Ruslan Yamadayev, Russian politician

=== November ===
- 3 November – Brooks Mileson, British businessman,
- 4 November – Syd Lucas, British World War I veteran
- 12 November – Mitch Mitchell, British drummer
- 16 November – Reg Varney, British actor

=== December ===
- 8 December – Oliver Postgate, British animator, puppeteer and writer
- 14 December – Kathy Staff, British actress
- 24 December – Harold Pinter, British playwright

== See also ==
- 2008 in the European Union
- List of state leaders in 2008 § Europe
