= Death toll =

Death toll is the number of dead as a result of a war, disaster, or other event.

It may also refer to:

- Death Toll, 2008 action film
- High-Ballin', 1978 action comedy film also released as Death Toll

== See also ==
- List of lists organized by death toll
