= COVID-19 pandemic in Monaco =

Aspect of viral disease pandemic

- Disease: COVID-19
- Pathogen: SARS-CoV-2
- Location: Monaco
- First outbreak: Wuhan, Hubei, China
- Arrival date: 29 February 2020 (6 years, 5 months and 4 weeks)
- Confirmed cases: 17,181
- Recovered: 2,460
- Deaths: 67
- Fatality rate: 0.39%
- Vaccinations: 28,875 (total vaccinated); 25,667 (fully vaccinated); 71,929 (doses administered)

Government website
- https://covid19.mc/ https://www.gouv.mc/Action-Gouvernementale/Coronavirus-Covid-19/Actualites

The COVID-19 pandemic in Monaco was a part of the ongoing worldwide pandemic of coronavirus disease 2019 (COVID-19) caused by severe acute respiratory syndrome coronavirus 2 (SARS-CoV-2). The virus was confirmed to have reached Monaco on 29 February 2020. As of 8 February 2021, the infection rate was 1 case per 19 inhabitants and the death rate was 1 in 1,613. As of February 2022, a total of 9,053 people were affected by COVID-19 since the beginning of the pandemic. As of 4 December 2022, a total of 71,027 vaccine doses had been administered.

== Background ==
On 12 January 2020, the World Health Organization (WHO) confirmed that a novel coronavirus was the cause of a respiratory illness in a cluster of people in Wuhan, Hubei, China, which was reported to the WHO on 31 December 2019.

The case fatality ratio for COVID-19 has been much lower than SARS of 2003, but the transmission has been significantly greater, with a significant total death toll.

== Timeline ==
=== February 2020 ===
On 29 February, Monaco announced its first case, a man who was admitted to the Princess Grace Hospital Centre then transferred to Nice University Hospital in France.

=== March 2020 ===
On 14 March, the government ordered the closing of nurseries, gyms, parks, monuments and schools. The Saint Patrick's concert was suspended.

On 16 March, Head of the Monegasque Government Serge Telle became the first head of government to test positive for COVID-19.

On 17 March, for the first time in his reign, Albert II addressed the nation in a serious speech reporting on the strengthening of quarantine measures. Two days later Albert became the first head of state to test positive for coronavirus. He later denied suggestions that he had infected Charles, Prince of Wales at an event the two had attended in London on 10 March.

The Monaco Grand Prix was cancelled on 19 March after organizers were unable to rearrange a date for the race beyond the scheduled date of 24 May, marking the first time the event had not run since 1954.

On 25 March, the Government announced that the number of people affected by the coronavirus had reached 31.

== Statistics ==
=== New cases per day ===
View source data.

=== Deaths per day ===
View source data.

== See also ==
- COVID-19 pandemic in Europe
- COVID-19 pandemic by country and territory
