= 2007 in Monaco =

== Incumbents ==
- Monarch: Albert II
- State Minister: Jean-Paul Proust

== Events ==
=== May ===
- 27 May - Fernando Alonso won the Monaco Grand Prix.

=== August ===
- Prince Albert II was a guest of Russian President Vladimir Putin at a czarist residence outside Saint Petersburg. Putin thanked the prince, a member of the International Olympic Committee, for his support of Sochi's successful bid to host the 2014 Winter Olympics.
- Prince Albert also took part in a four-day, 100 km dogsled expedition to the North Pole from a Russian base.

== See also ==
- 2007 in Europe
- City states
