= National Day of Monaco =

Public holiday in Monaco

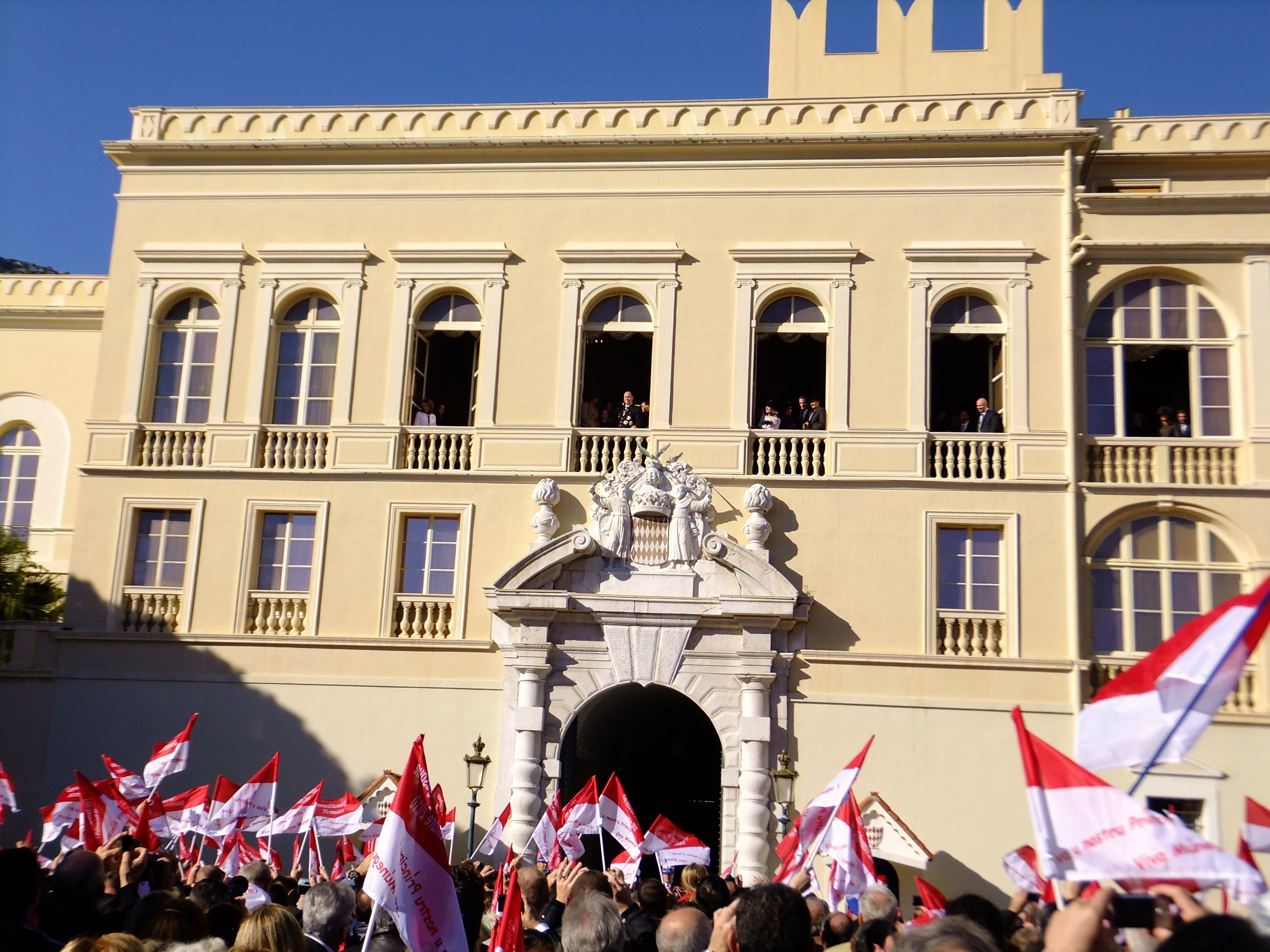
National Day in Monaco

The National Day of Monaco (French: La Fête du Prince, literally Prince's holiday) also known as The Sovereign Prince's Day is currently annually celebrated on 19 November.

== Date ==
The date of the National Day is traditionally determined by the reigning Prince. The previous Princes often chose the day of the saint they were named after. For instance the late Prince Rainier III chose 19 November, the day that celebrates Saint Rainier. When Prince Albert II ascended the throne he ended this tradition by choosing the same day as his father, instead of the day of St. Albert, 15 November. 19 November is also the day of Albert II's official ascension to the throne.

== Celebrations ==
National Day is typically celebrated with fireworks over the harbour the evening before and a mass in the St. Nicholas Cathedral the next morning.

The people of Monaco may celebrate by displaying the Monegasque flag.

It is an opportunity to see the pomp and circumstance of the Principality. Knights of Malta, distinguished ambassadors, consuls and state officials wear medal-laden uniforms as they congregate in the Saint Nicholas Cathedral after the mass. The Princely Family of Monaco is expected to show up on national day. The birth of Albert II's children has been celebrated in a similar fashion as a national day and 7 January 2015 was declared a public holiday (one-time only).

== See also ==
- Public holidays in Monaco
