= Jean-Paul Proust =

Minister of State of Monaco from 2005 to 2010

His Excellency Jean-Paul Proust
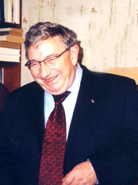

21st Minister of State of Monaco
- In office 1 May 2005 – 29 March 2010
- Monarch: Albert II
- Preceded by: Patrick Leclercq
- Succeeded by: Michel Roger

Personal details
- Born: 3 March 1940 Vaas, Sarthe, France
- Died: 8 April 2010 (aged 70) Marseille, France
- Party: Independent
- Education: École Nationale d'Administration

Jean-Paul Proust (3 March 1940 – 8 April 2010) was a French and Monegasque civil servant. He served as the Minister of State of Monaco.

== Early life ==
Jean-Paul Proust was born on 3 March 1940 in Vaas, Sarthe, France. He graduated from the École Nationale d'Administration.

== Career ==
He was a long-time member of the French civil service. He served as Prefect of Guadeloupe from November 1989 to July 1991 and as the chief of police of Paris from 2001 to 6 December 2004.

Likewise, he then served as the Monégasque Minister of State, a post equivalent to Prime Minister. As such, he had the honor of administering Prince Albert II his oath of office as Sovereign Prince of Monaco. He held that position from 1 June 2005 to 29 March 2010, having been appointed three months earlier by the prince and the French government.

He was made a Grand Officer of the Order of Saint-Charles (25 March 2010). He was the head of government of Monaco until 2010.

== Death ==
He died on 8 April 2010 at the age of 70.

Political offices
Preceded by Patrick Leclercq	Minister of State of Monaco; 2005–2010	Succeeded by Michel Roger
