= Pierre Dartout =

Minister of State of Monaco from 2020 to 2024

His Excellency Pierre Dartout
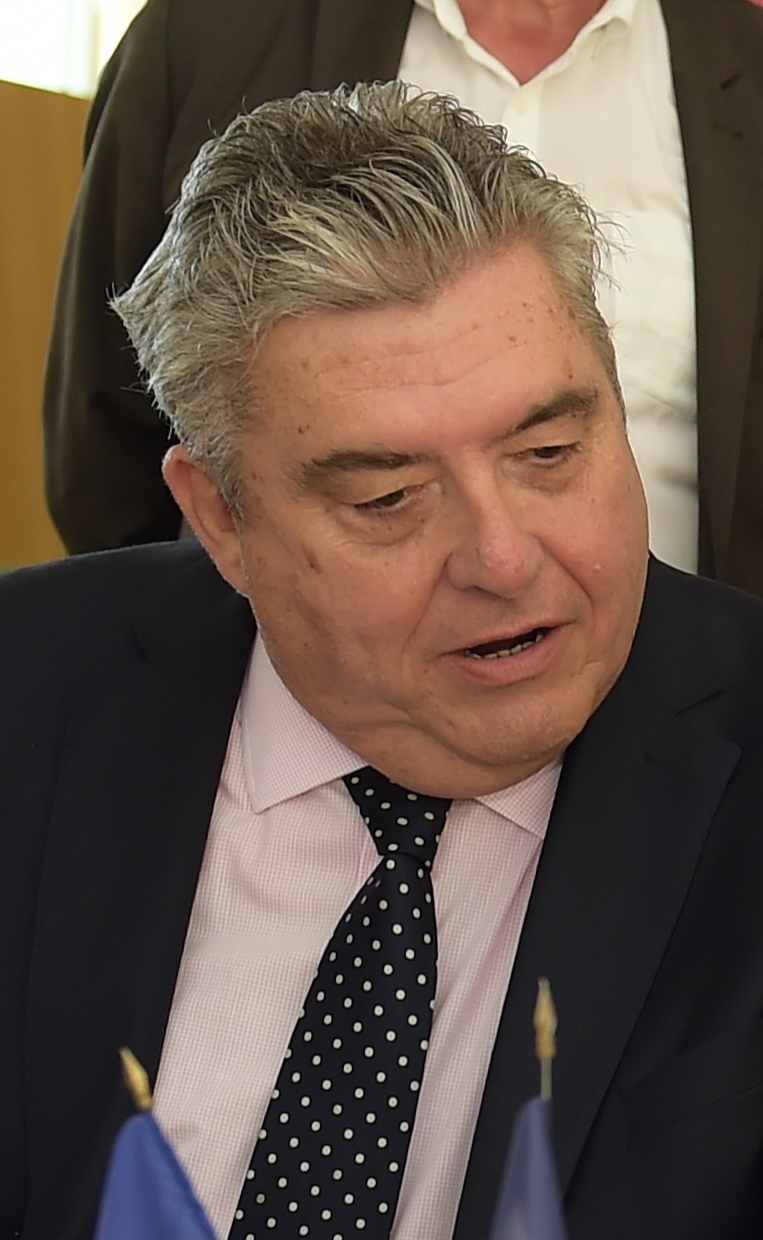
- Dartout in 2017

24th Minister of State of Monaco
- In office 1 September 2020 – 2 September 2024
- Monarch: Albert II
- Preceded by: Serge Telle
- Succeeded by: Didier Guillaume

Personal details
- Born: 9 April 1954 (age 72) Limoges, France
- Party: Independent
- Education: École nationale d'administration; Sciences Po

Pierre Dartout (French pronunciation: [pjɛʁ daʁtu]; born 9 April 1954) is a French civil servant who was the Minister of State of Monaco from 2020 to 2024 under Prince Albert II. He previously served as a prefect in France from 1997 to 2020. His first posting was in French Guiana. Upon the announcement of his appointment in Monaco, he was in office in Bouches-du-Rhône. Dartout held key positions in the prefecture corps from 1980.

== Career ==
=== Education ===
Dartout pursued his degree in law at Sciences Po (Paris Institute of Political Studies). He completed his military service in 1977. He enrolled at the École nationale d'administration from 1978 to 1980. After graduating from the ENA (École nationale d'administration) he pursued his career in public administration in 1980.

=== Career in France ===
Dartout served as a prefect of French Guiana from 1995 to 1997. He then served as the prefect of Pyrénées-Orientales from 1998 to 2000. After resigning from Pyrénées-Orientales, he served as the prefect of Drôme from 2000 to 2002. He also had a brief stint as the prefect of Pyrénées-Atlantiques from 2002 to 2004.

He served as the prefect of Provence-Alpes-Côte d'Azur and Bouches du Rhone from 2017 to 2020. On 24 August 2020, he resigned from the position of prefect of Bouches du Rhone after being officially announced as the next prime minister.

=== Career in Monaco ===
On 15 May 2020, Dartout was chosen by Albert II, as the Prime Minister. He took the oath and assumed his duties as the 25th Prime Minister of Monaco on 1 September 2020, succeeding Serge Telle. The swearing in ceremony was held before the presence of Prince Albert II at the Prince's Palace.

== See also ==
- Politics of Monaco
- Constitution of Monaco
- Crown Council of Monaco
- Foreign relations of Monaco

Political offices
Preceded by Serge Telle	Prime Minister of Monaco; 2020–2024	Succeeded by Didier Guillaume
