= Michel Roger =

Minister of State of Monaco from 2010 to 2015

His Excellency Michel Roger
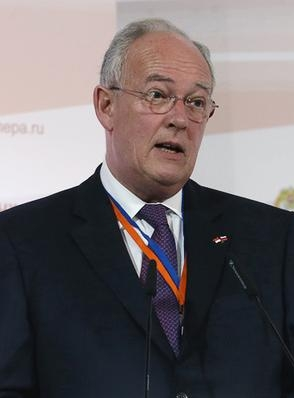

22nd Minister of State of Monaco
- In office 29 March 2010 – 16 December 2015
- Monarch: Albert II
- Preceded by: Jean-Paul Proust
- Succeeded by: Gilles Tonelli (Acting); Serge Telle

Personal details
- Born: 9 March 1949 (age 77) Poitiers, France
- Education: University of Poitiers

Michel Roger (French pronunciation: [miʃɛl ʁɔʒe]; born 9 March 1949) is a French and Monégasque politician who served as Minister of State of Monaco from 2010 to 2015. Prior to his tenure as Minister of State, he served on the Supreme Court of Monaco and as a municipal councilor in Poitiers.

== Early life ==
Michel Roger was born in Poitiers, France, on 9 March 1949, and is a citizen of France. He studied law at the University of Poitiers (UP).

== Career ==
Roger started working as a lawyer in France in 1970. He was a lecturer at the Faculty of Law of UP until 1986. He was the Director of the Institute of Judicial Studies at UP and the Centre-West School of Lawyers from 1984 to 1986.

Starting in the 1970s Roger worked in the Ministry of Justice under Jean Lecanuet, the Ministry of National Education under René Monory from 1987 to 1988, and the Minister for Territorial Planning and Management. He worked as Monory's chief of staff when Monory was both Minister of National Education and president of the Senate. He was an advisor on higher education and research to Prime Minister Jean-Pierre Raffarin from 2002 to 2005.

In Poitiers, Roger was a municipal councilor from 1983 to 2001. In 2007, Roger was appointed to the Supreme Court of Monaco.

Albert II, Prince of Monaco appointed Roger Minister of State on 3 March 2010, and he assumed office on 29 March. Serge Telle replaced him as Minister of State on 1 February 2016.

== Personal life ==
Roger is married and is the father of one child. He suffered a stroke on 14 December 2015, and was released from a Poitiers hospital in 2016.

== Honours ==
- Order pro Merito Melitensi
- Order of St. Gregory the Great
- Grand officer in the Order of the Holy Sepulchre
- 2016: Grand officer in the Order of Saint-Charles.
- 2016: Order of Friendship, following the year of Russia in Monaco.

== Works cited ==
=== Books ===
- Lansford, Tom, ed. (2017). Political Handbook of The World 2016–2017. CQ Press. ISBN 9781506327143.

=== News ===
- "Michel Roger, pilote en chef de Monaco". La Nouvelle République du Centre-Ouest. 19 December 2015. Archived from the original on 25 June 2025.
- "Michel Roger victime d'un AVC". La Nouvelle République du Centre-Ouest. 19 December 2015. Archived from the original on 25 June 2025.
- Tanti, Cassandra (11 December 2016). "Exhibition dedicated to Monaco's former Minister of State". Monaco Life. Archived from the original on 25 June 2025.

=== Web ===
- "Administrative Organization". Monaco. Archived from the original on 22 September 2013.
- "Le Ministre d'Etat". Monaco. Archived from the original on 8 December 2011.
- "Nomination of a new Minister of State of the Principality of Monaco". Monaco Embassy in the United States. Archived from the original on 25 June 2025.

Political offices
Preceded by Jean-Paul Proust	Minister of State of Monaco; 2010–2015	Succeeded by Gilles Tonelli; Acting
