= Serge Telle =

French diplomat (born 1955)

His Excellency Serge Telle
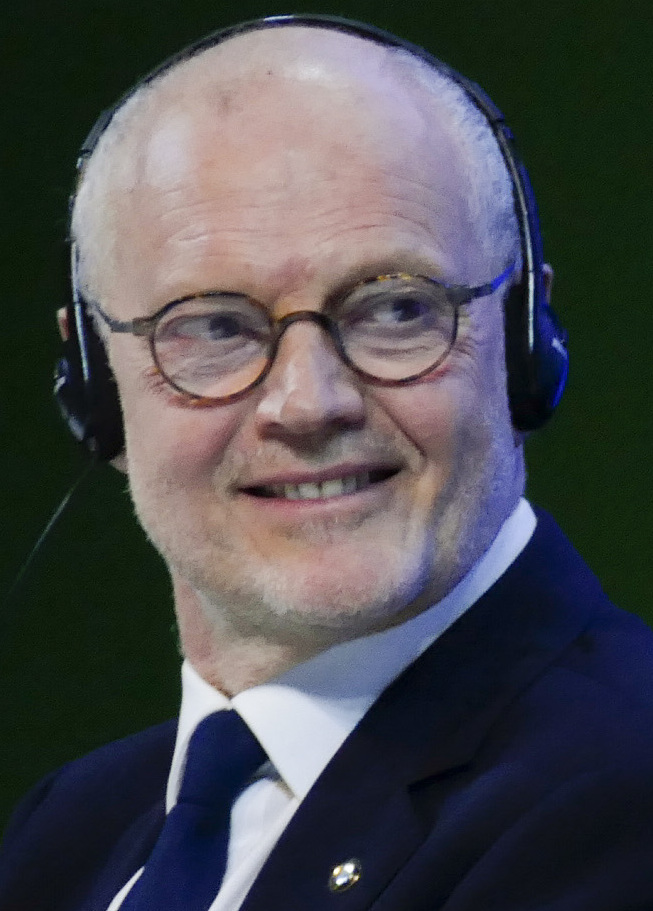

23rd Minister of State of Monaco
- In office 1 February 2016 – 31 August 2020
- Monarch: Albert II
- Preceded by: Gilles Tonelli (Acting)
- Succeeded by: Pierre Dartout

Personal details
- Born: Serge Raymond Roger Telle; 5 May 1955 (age 71) Nantes, France
- Party: Independent
- Education: Sciences Po; National Institute for Oriental; Languages and Civilizations

Serge Raymond Roger Telle (French pronunciation: [sɛʁʒ tɛl]; born 5 May 1955) is a French diplomat. He served as Minister of State of Monaco from 2016 to 2020.

== Early life ==
Serge Telle was born on 5 May 1955 in Nantes, France. His father was an engineer.

Telle graduated from Sciences Po. He also earned a degree in Swahili from the National Institute for Oriental Languages and Civilizations, and another degree in Community Law.

== Career ==
Telle joined the French Foreign Ministry in 1982, when he first worked as Second Secretary at the Embassy of France, Tanzania in Dar es Salaam, Tanzania until 1984. He was the First Secretary at the Permanent Mission of France to the United Nations in New York City from 1984 to 1988. He was a diplomatic advisor to Secretary of State Humanitarian Action Bernard Kouchner from 1988 to 1992. He worked in the Foreign and Commonwealth Office from 1992 to 1993, and at the United Nations Office at Geneva from 1993 to 1997. He was an advisor to Prime Minister Lionel Jospin from 1997 to 2002, with a focus on Middle Eastern and African affairs.

Telle served as Consul General (later Ambassador) of France to Monaco from 2002 to 2007. He was an advisor to Foreign Minister Bernard Kouchner from 2007 to 2008. He was the French ambassador to the Union for the Mediterranean from 2008 to 2012, and the interministerial delegate for the Mediterranean from 2013 to 2015. He was also the president of the Agency for Cities and Territories of the Mediterranean from 2011 to 2016. Telle was appointed Minister of State of Monaco on 1 February 2016, succeeding Michel Roger.

On 16 March 2020 Telle tested positive for COVID-19.

== Honours ==
=== French honours ===
- Knight of the National Order of Legion of Honour
- Knight of the National Order of Merit

=== Monégasque honours ===
- Commander of the Order of Saint-Charles

== Personal life ==
From his first marriage with Karène Telle, he has 3 children named Anne-Claire, Jean-Baptiste and Antoine. After getting divorced, he met and married Guilaine Chenu, a television presenter. They have a son, Alexis.

Political offices
Preceded by Gilles Tonelli; Acting	Minister of State of Monaco; 2016–2020	Succeeded by Pierre Dartout
