= History of Monaco =

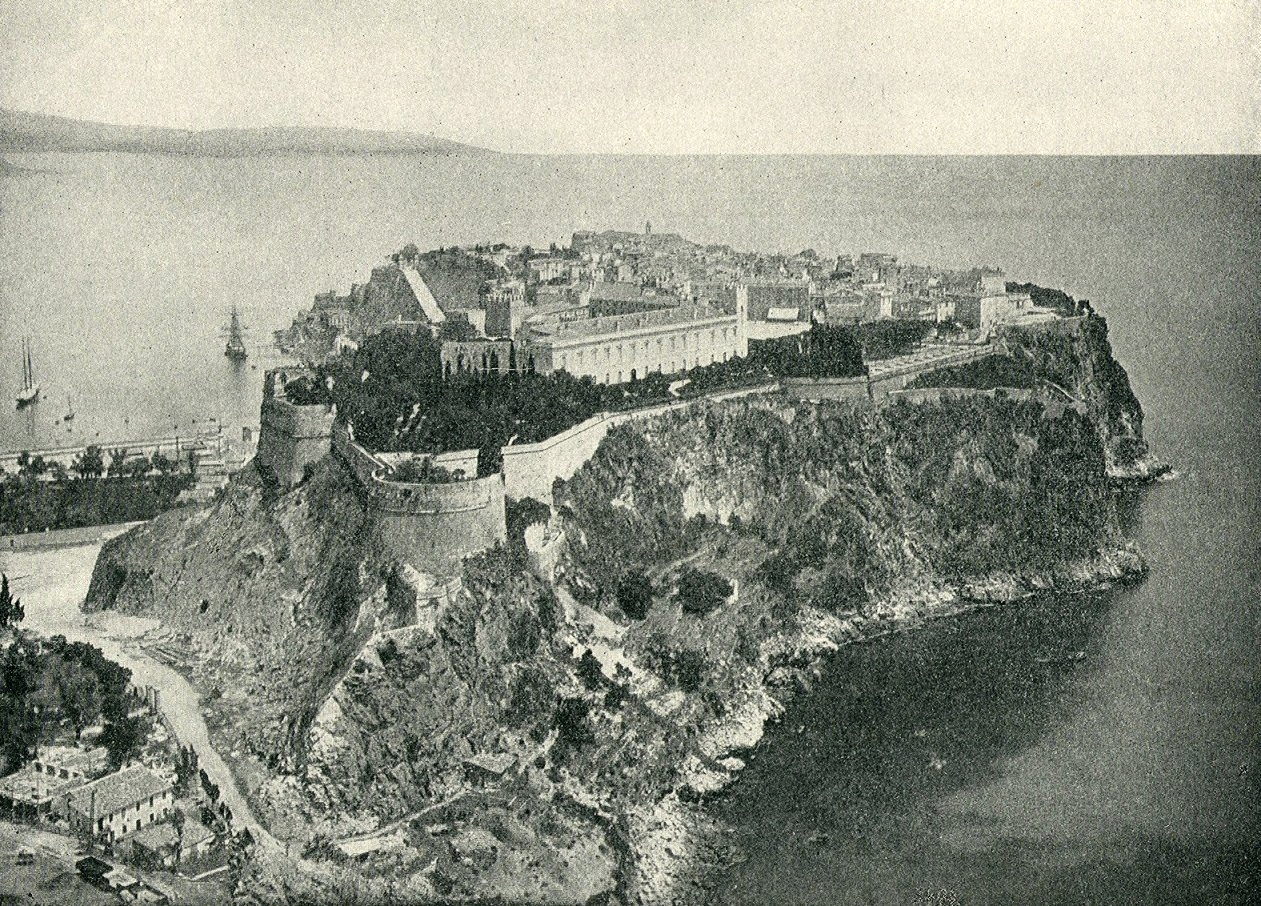
The Rock in 1890

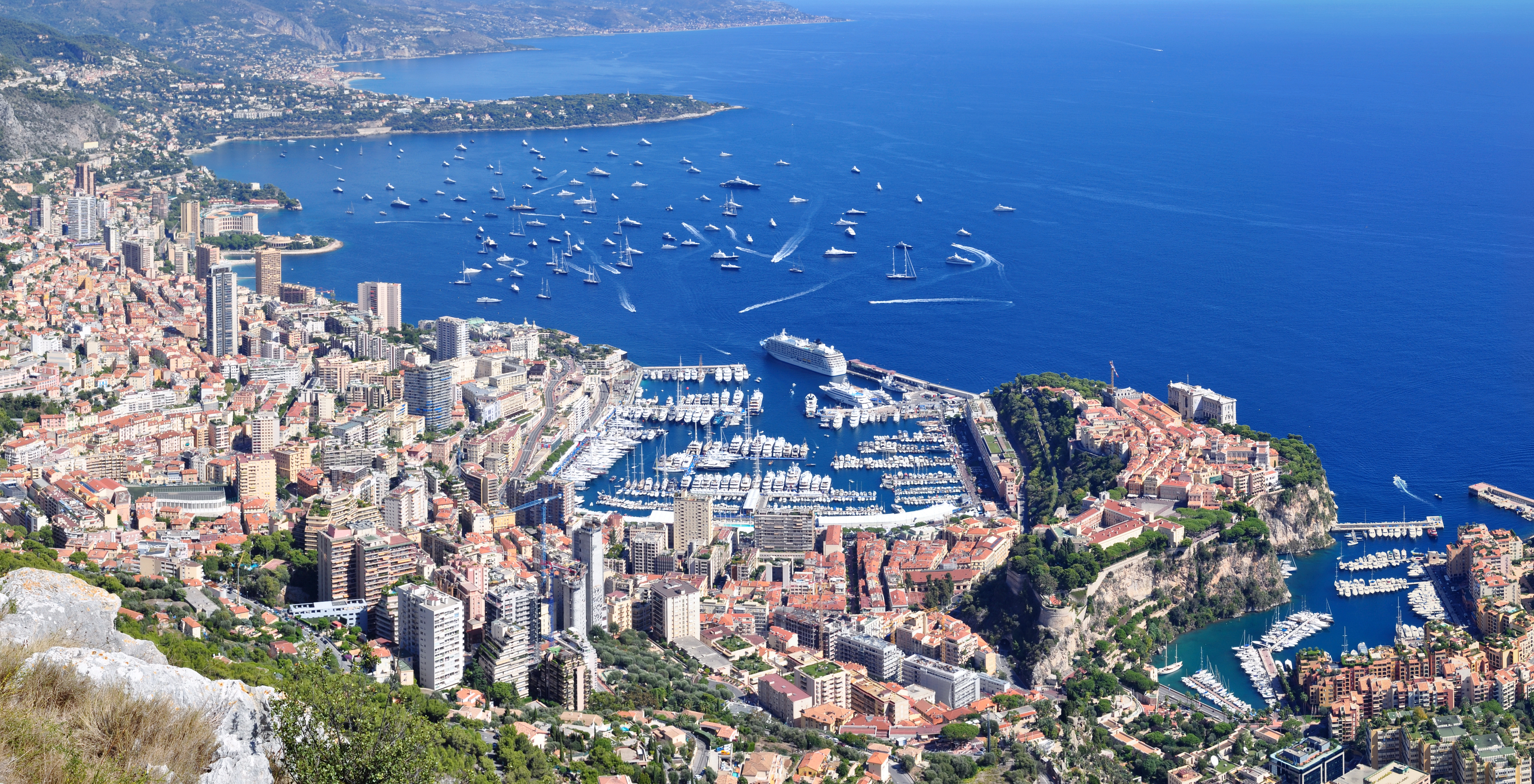
Monaco in 2011

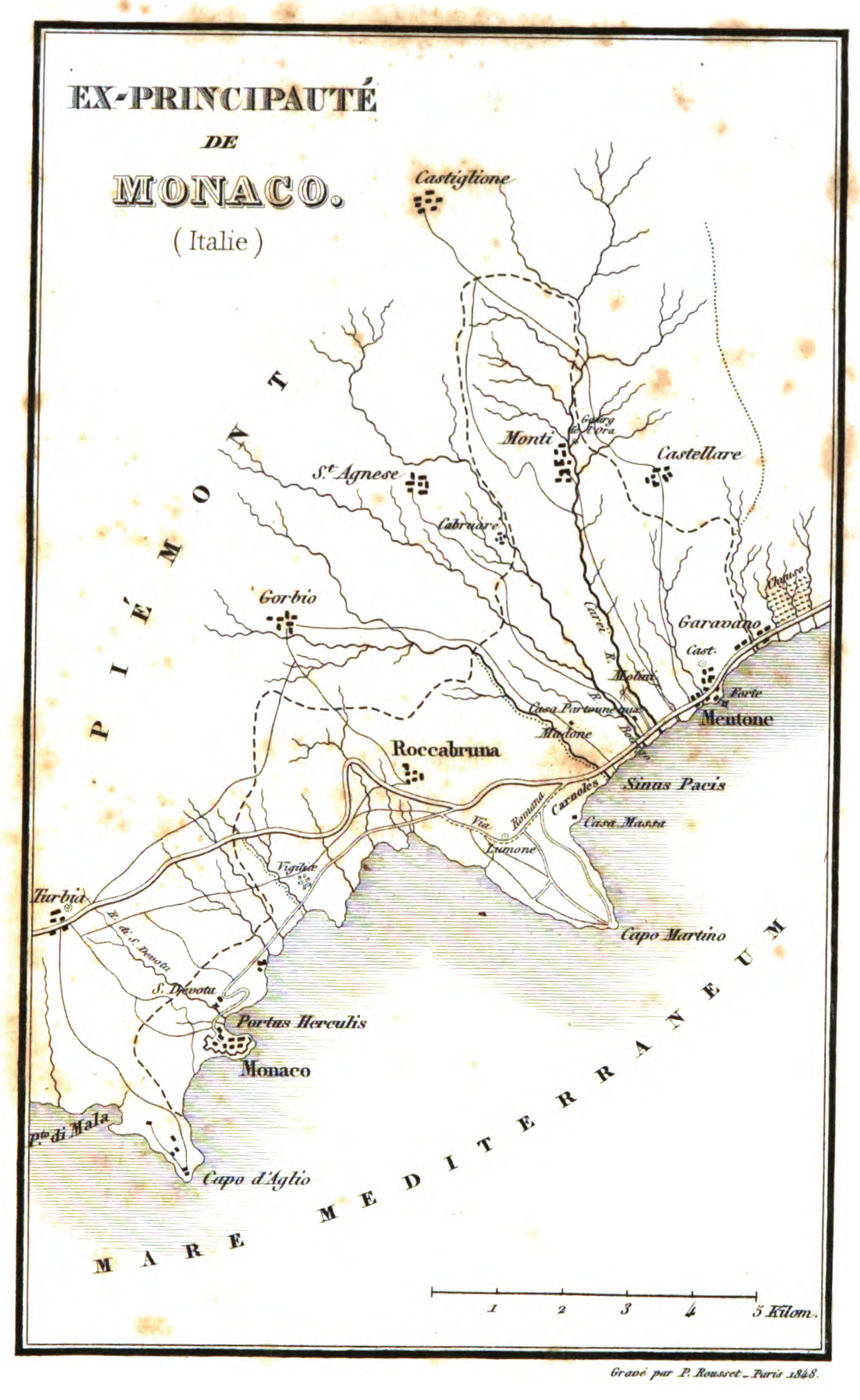
Monaco in 1848, before it gave up areas to France

The early history of Monaco is primarily concerned with the protective and strategic value of the Rock of Monaco, the area's chief geological landmark, which served first as a shelter for ancient peoples and later as a fortress. Part of Liguria's history since the fall of the Roman Empire, from the 14th to the early 15th century the area was contested for primarily political reasons. Since that point, excepting a brief period of French occupation, it has remained steadily under the control of the House of Grimaldi.

The early history of Monaco as a state has its origins in the Republic of Genoa. The Holy Roman Empire granted Monaco to the Genoese. Later, the Genoese family of Grimaldi held it throughout the 13th century and later purchased it to rule as a principality. Over its history, it has enjoyed differing levels of autonomy from a parent state, which at times included the Republic of Genoa, the Crown of Aragon, Spain, and France. It was incorporated into France after the French Revolution, but later regained some autonomy as a protectorate of the Kingdom of Sardinia in the 19th Century. In 1848, the two cities of Menton and Roquebrune (Mentone and Roccabruna) seceded and were later lost to France, but Monaco remained independent. France bought Mentone and Roccabruna, and agreed to respect Monaco's sovereignty. Despite the loss of the two towns, from the 1860s onward its economy was focused on tourism and the country enjoyed stability until its territory was occupied by the Axis powers during World War II. After liberation, Monaco worked to secure further independence from France, and was recognized by the UN in 1993. It is not part of the European Union but uses the euro currency.

== Early history and Ligurian settlement ==
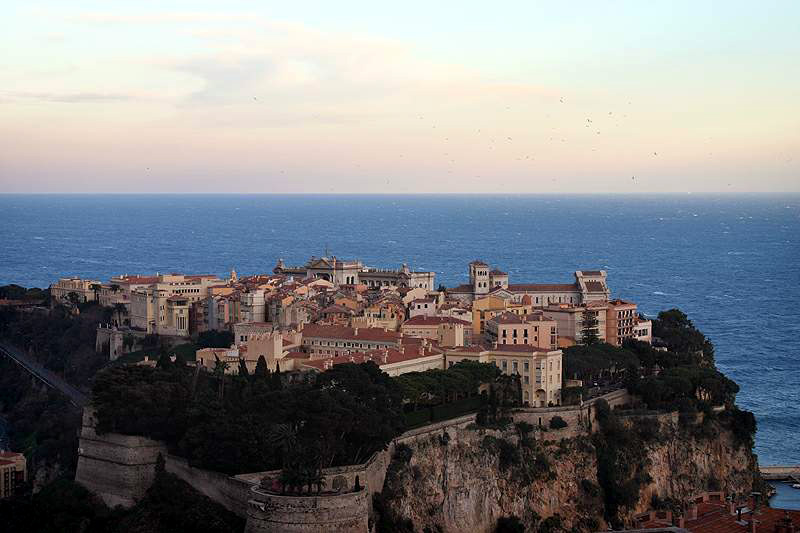
The Rock in modern times

Grimaldi man lived here about 30,000 years ago.

According to the accounts of historian Diodorus Siculus and geographer Strabo, the area's first permanent settlers were the mountain-dwelling Ligures, who emigrated from their native city of Genoa, in what is now northern Italy. However, the ancient Ligurian language is not directly connected to the Gallo-Italic language spoken by the modern inhabitants of Liguria, of which Monegasque is a dialect.

== Phoenician colonization and Melqart ==
According to some authorities, the Eighteenth Dynasty of Egypt (1550 BC to 1292 BC), but according to others, the early Phoenicians were the first commercial navigators, who found refuge in the Port of Monaco from the mistral of the sea. The Port and Rock of Monaco were consecrated by the Phoenicians in the name of their deity Melqart. The colony was called Monoike. After the Phoenicians, the Greeks wrote about the progress and conquests of the journeys and labors of Heracles. The native Ligurian people asserted that Hercules passed through the area.

== Greek colonization and Herculean legend ==
During the 6th-century BC, Phocaeans from Massalia (modern day Marseille) founded the colony of Monoikos. The name of the colony derives from the local veneration of the Greek demigod Heracles, also later adopted by the Romans, who was said to have constructed the ancient path that passed through the region from Spain to Italy. The Roman emperor Julian also wrote of Hercules's construction of Monaco's port and a coastal road. The road was dotted with altars to Heracles, and a temple dedicated to him was established on the Rock of Monaco. The name Port Hercules was subsequently used for the ancient port. Monoeci meaning "Single One" or Monoikos meaning "Single House" could be a reference to Hercules or his temple, or the isolated community inhabiting the area around the rock.

According to the "travels of Heracles" theme, also documented by Diodorus Siculus and Strabo, both Greeks and native Ligurian people asserted that Heracles passed through the area.

== Roman rule ==
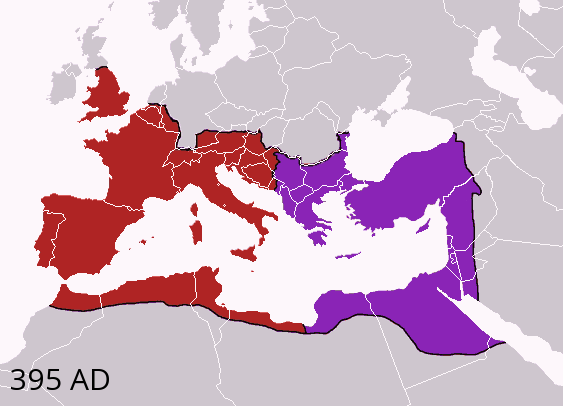
The division of the Empire after the death of Theodosius I, c. 395 AD, superimposed on modern borders: Western Roman Empire Eastern Roman Empire (Byzantine Empire)

After the Gallic Wars, Monoecus, which served as a stopping-point for Julius Caesar on his way to campaign in Greece, fell under Roman control as part of the Maritime Alps province (Gallia Transalpina).

The Roman poet Virgil called it "that castled cliff, Monoecus by the sea". The commentator Servius's use of the passage asserts, under the entry portus, that the epithet was derived:

either because Hercules drove off everyone else and lived there alone, or because in his temple no other of the gods is worshipped at the same time.

No temple to Hercules has been found at Monaco.

The port is mentioned in Pliny the Elder's Natural History and in Tacitus's Histories, when Fabius Valens was forced to put into the port.

== Dark ages to the Genoese ==
The Holy Roman Empire granted Monaco to Genoa.

Monaco remained under Roman control until the collapse of the Western Roman Empire in 476. The city was then under the domain of Odoacer until his fall at the hands of the Ostrogoths in the late 5th century. Monaco was recaptured by the Romans during the reign of Justinian in the mid-6th century and was held until its capture by the Lombards in the 7th century. Monaco then passed hands between the Lombards and Franks. After having been damaged by the Saracens in the 8th century, it was rebuilt by the monks of Saint-Pons in Nice, who held it territorially starting from 1075. The city was further damaged and nearly abandoned as Saracen raids continued after they had put under their control a part of Provence with a base at Fraxinetum. Monaco is again mentioned in the 11th century, when the church of St. Mary was built and a borough rose around it.

In 1191, Holy Roman Emperor Henry VI granted suzerainty over the area to the city of Genoa. On 10 June 1215, a detachment of Genoese Ghibellines led by Fulco del Cassello began the construction of a fortress atop the Rock of Monaco. This date is often cited as the beginning of Monaco's modern history.

As the Ghibellines intended their fortress to be a strategic military stronghold and center of control for the area, they set about creating a settlement around the base of the Rock to support the garrison; in an attempt to lure residents from Genoa and the surrounding cities, they offered land grants and tax exemption to new settlers.

== Middle Ages: Rise of the Grimaldis ==
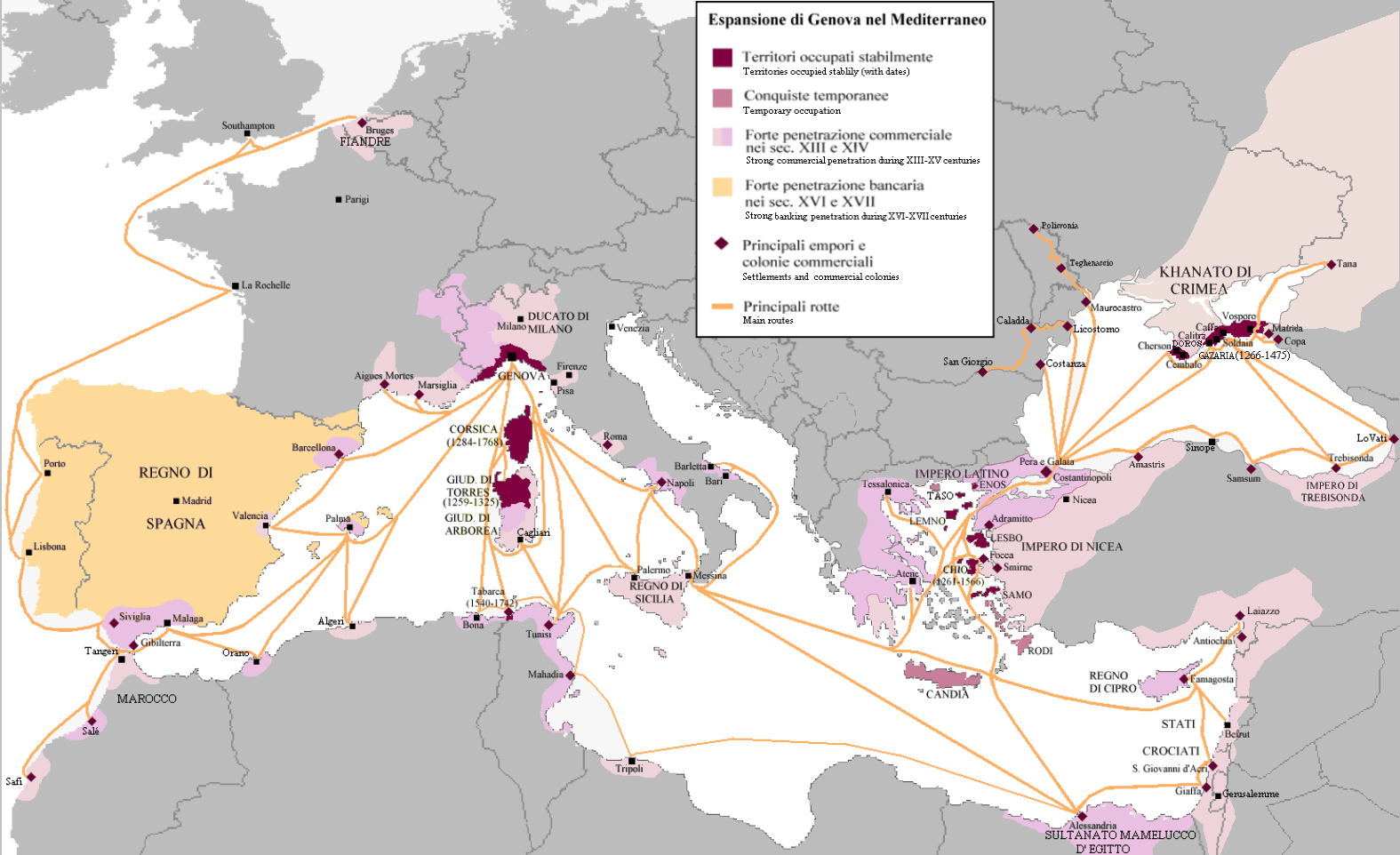
Overview of the Genovese trading empire

Overview of Crown of Aragon

The Grimaldis, descended from Otto Canella and taking their name from his son Grimaldo, were an ancient and prominent Guelphic Genoese family. Members of this family, in the course of the civil strife in Genoa between the Guelphs and Ghibellines, took refuge in Monaco, accompanied by various other Guelphic families, most notably the Fieschis.

Francesco Grimaldi seized the Rock of Monaco in 1297, starting the Grimaldi dynasty, under the sovereignty of the Republic of Genoa. The Grimaldis acquired Menton in 1346 and Roquebrune in 1355, enlarging their possessions. In 1338 Monegasque ships under the command of Carlo Grimaldi participated, along with those of France and Genoa, in the English Channel naval campaign. Plunder from the sack of Southampton was brought back to Monaco, contributing to the principality's prosperity.

The Treaty of Burgos in 1524 (or the treaty of Tordesilla of 1524), saw Monaco under the authority of Spain as an autonomous state for about a century, and there was a Spanish garrison at the fortress.

Honoré II, Prince of Monaco secured recognition of his independent sovereignty from Spain in 1633, and then from Louis XIII of France by the Treaty of Péronne (1641). Since then the area has remained under the control of the Grimaldi family to the present day, except when under French control during the French Revolution from 1793 to May 17, 1814, as part of the département of Alpes-Maritimes.

It was a protectorate of the Kingdom of Sardinia from 1815 to 1860. However, the towns of Mentone and Roccabruna ceded in 1848, and these were annexed by France in 1861. Monaco managed to avoid incorporation into France or Italy, but at the cost of most its territory at that time.

== Fall and rise, 1789–1815 ==
From 1793 to 1814 Monaco was taken over by France.

In 1789, the French seized all the Princely financial assets. The French Revolution progressed, and in 1793 Monaco was seized by the French. The Princely family was put in prison (later freed), the art collections and assets were seized and sold off, and the palace was used as hospital and poor house. In 1814 Napoleon abdicated, and Honore IV was restored to power. However, in the Final Act of the Congress of Vienna in 1815, Monaco was made a protectorate of the Kingdom of Sardinia.

== Protectorate of the Kingdom of Sardinia ==
Kingdom of Sardinia in 1815. Monaco was annexed as protectorate this year.

The principality was re-established in 1814, only to be designated a protectorate of the Kingdom of Sardinia by the Congress of Vienna in 1815 and the Treaty of Stupinigi in 1817. Monaco remained in this position until 1860, when by the Treaty of Turin, Sardinia ceded to France the surrounding county of Nice (as well as Savoy).

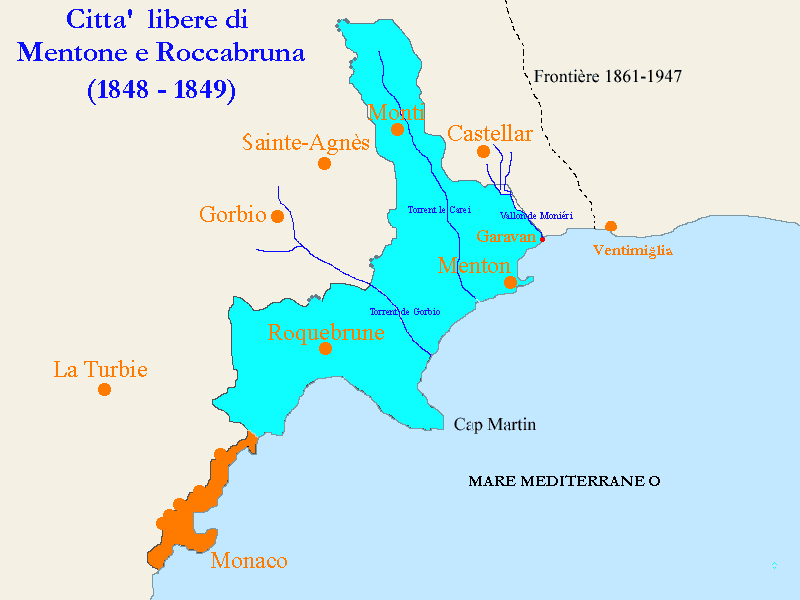
Map of the territory of the "Free cities of Mentone and Roccabruna" (light blue) and the territory of Monaco (orange) in 1848. Those territories were the Principality of Monaco from the Renaissance until that year.

In 1848 the towns of Mentone and Roccabruna ceded from Monaco, and in 1849 became a separate protectorate of the Kingdom of Sardinia. (see also Free Cities of Menton and Roquebrune)

With the protectorate, that lasted nearly half a century, Italian was the official language of Monaco. The Monégasque dialect is closer to Ligurian than French, but influenced by both.

During this time there was unrest in the towns of Menton and Roquebrune, which declared independence, hoping for annexation by Sardinia and participation in the Italian Risorgimento. The unrest continued until the ruling prince gave up his claim to the two towns (some 95% of the country), and they were ceded to France in return for four million francs. This transfer and Monaco's sovereignty was recognised by the Franco-Monegasque Treaty of 1861.

== After 1860 ==
This graphic illustrates how the Kingdom of Sardina ceded Nice County, the region around Monaco, to France.

Designated as a protectorate of the Kingdom of Sardinia in 1815 by the Congress of Vienna after Napoleon's defeat, Monaco's sovereignty was confirmed by the Franco-Monegasque Treaty of 1861. France accepted the existence of the Principality of Monaco, but annexed 95% of its former territory (the areas of Menton and Roquebrune). Monaco's military defense since then has been the responsibility of France.

In 1848 the towns of Menton and Roquebrune ceded from Monaco and became protectorates of the Kingdom of Sardinia; this was to the Free Cities of Menton and Roquebrune. However, when Nice County was ceded to France, they were annexed from Monaco, which still had ownership.

Monaco became surrounded by France, when the Kingdom of Sardinia ceded the County of Nice to France in the Treaty of Turin (1860). The next year, in 1861, the Kingdom of Sardinia became a part of the Kingdom of Italy. Monaco had been a Protectorate of Sardinia, and managed to survive these changes, avoiding integration with France or Italy. By the early 1860s it had secured its independence but was now surrounded by France and without Menton or Roquebrune. To make ends meet Monaco would focus on tourism, and built the now famous Monte Carlo casino.

The Casino of Monte Carlo opened in 1863, organized by the Société des bains de mer de Monaco, which also ran the Hotel de Paris. Taxes paid by the S.B.M. have been plowed into Monaco's infrastructure. Economic development was spurred in the late 19th century with a railway link to France.

== 20th century ==
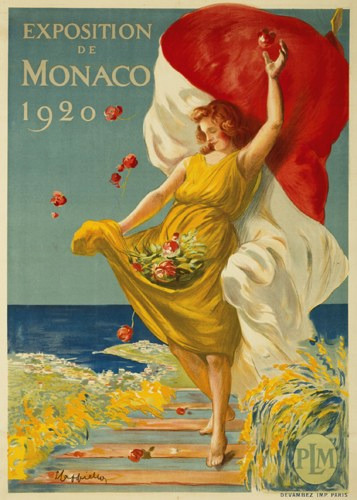
Poster for 1920 exposition

The Prince of Monaco was an absolute ruler until the Monegasque Revolution of 1910 forced him to proclaim a constitution in 1911.

In July 1918, a treaty was signed providing for limited French protection over Monaco. The treaty, written into the Treaty of Versailles, established that Monegasque policy would be aligned with French political, military, and economic interests. One of the motivations for the treaty was the upcoming Monaco Succession Crisis of 1918.

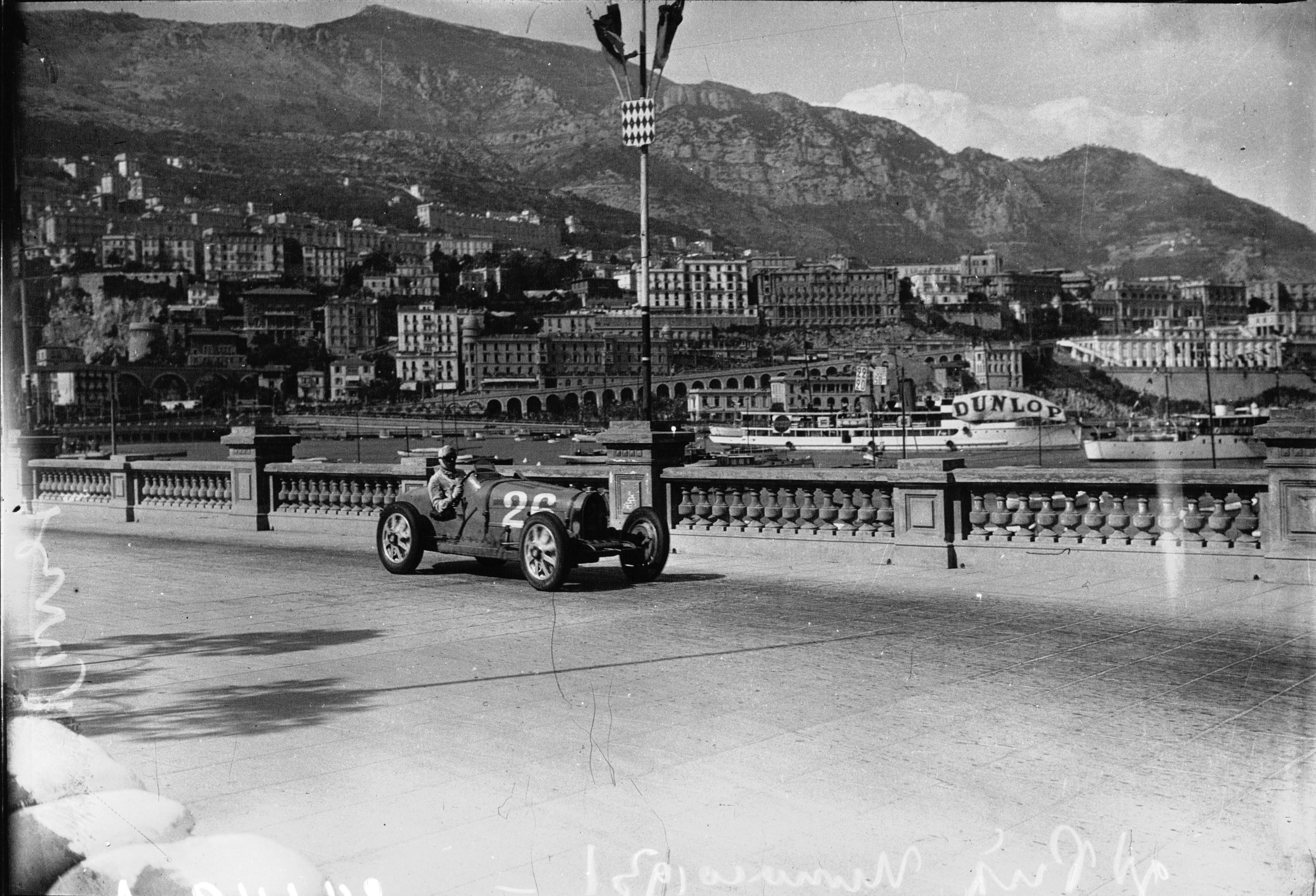
A scene from the 1931 Grand Prix. In the 20th century, racing would become a popular event.

While Prince Louis II's sympathies were strongly pro-French, he tried to keep Monaco neutral during World War II but supported the Vichy French government of his old army colleague, Marshal Philippe Pétain.

Nonetheless, his tiny principality was tormented by domestic conflict partly as a result of Louis's indecisiveness, and also because the majority of the population was of Italian descent; many of them supported the fascist regime of Italy's Benito Mussolini.

On 11 November 1942, the Italian Army invaded and occupied Monaco. Soon after in September 1943, following Mussolini's fall in Italy, the German Army occupied Monaco and began the deportation of the Jewish population.

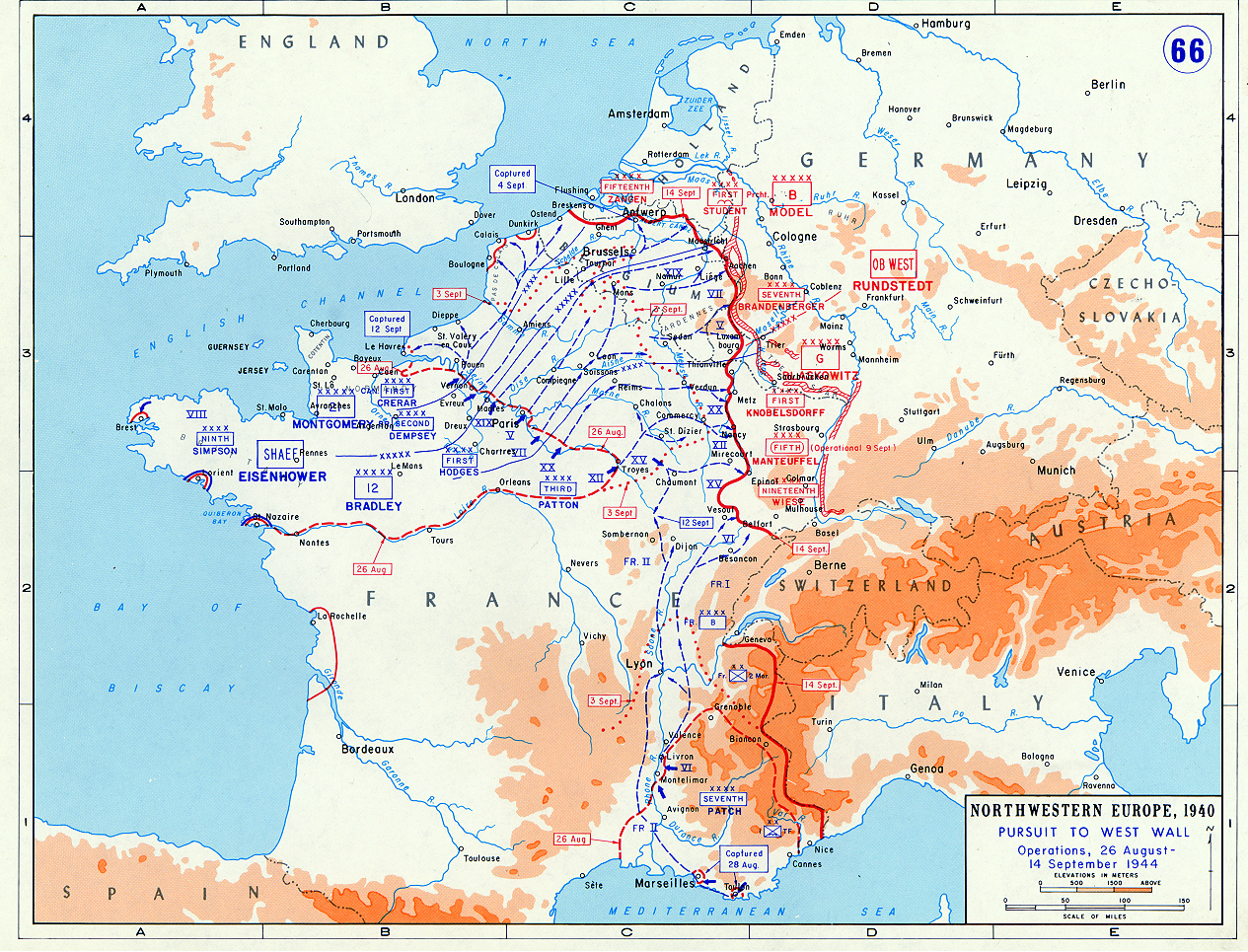
Western Front in 1944

In August 1944, the Germans executed René Borghini, Joseph-Henri Lajoux and Esther Poggio, who were Resistance leaders. The country was liberated on 3 September 1944 by Allied forces.

Prince Rainier III ascended to the throne following the death of his grandfather, Prince Louis II, in 1949.

The revised Constitution of Monaco, proclaimed in 1962, abolished capital punishment, provided for female suffrage, established a Supreme Court to guarantee fundamental liberties and made it difficult for a French national to transfer his or her residence there.

In 1993, Monaco became a member of the United Nations with full voting rights.

== 21st century ==
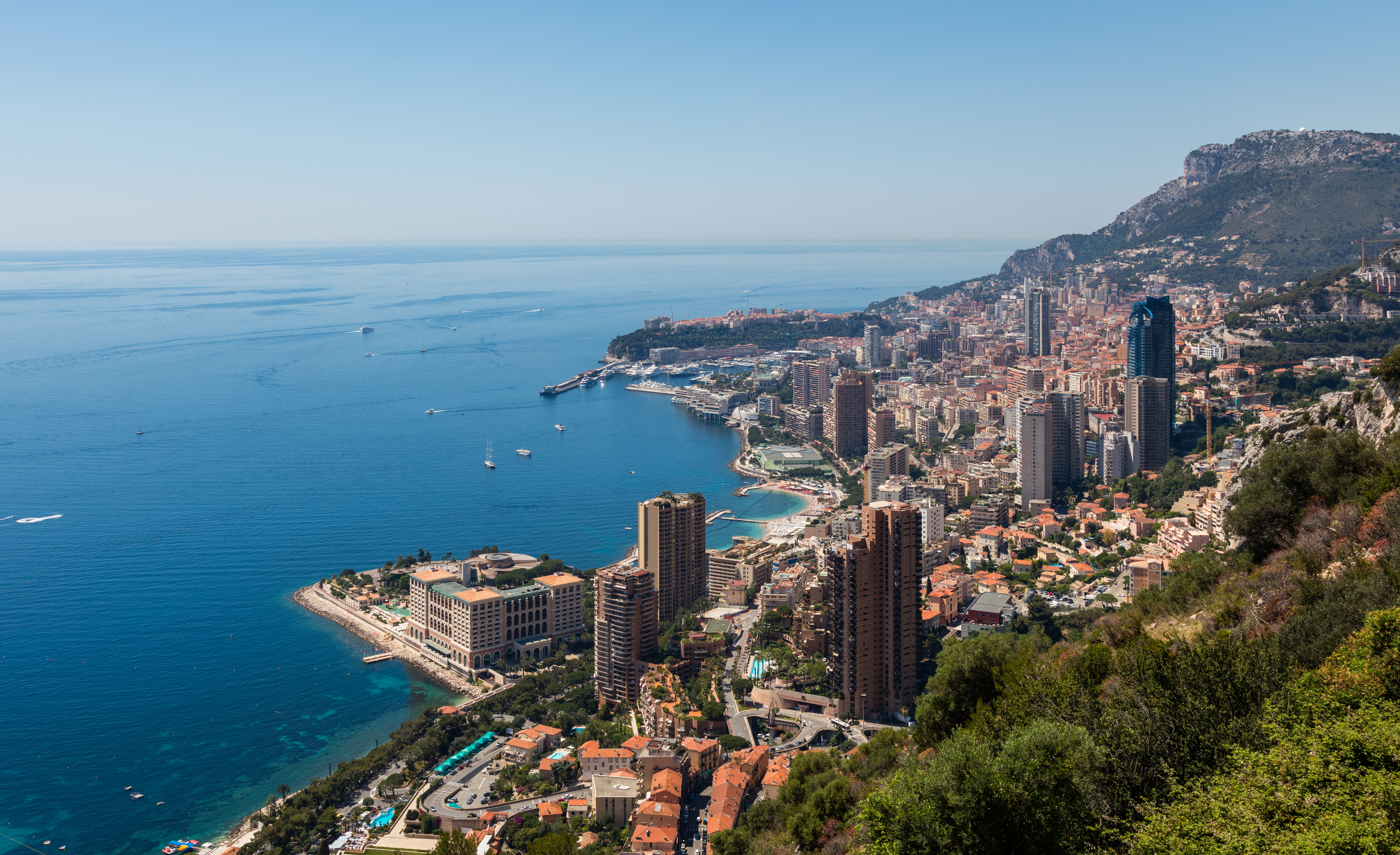
View of Monaco in 2016

In 2002, a new treaty between France and Monaco clarified that if there are no heirs to carry on the dynasty, the Principality will remain an independent nation, rather than be annexed by France. Monaco's military defence, however, is still the responsibility of France.

Prince Albert II succeeded his father Prince Rainier III in 2005.

Monaco's mild climate with historical sites and modern gambling casinos, make Monaco a popular tourism and recreation centre in the 21st century, with 4.1 tourists per resident as of 2020.

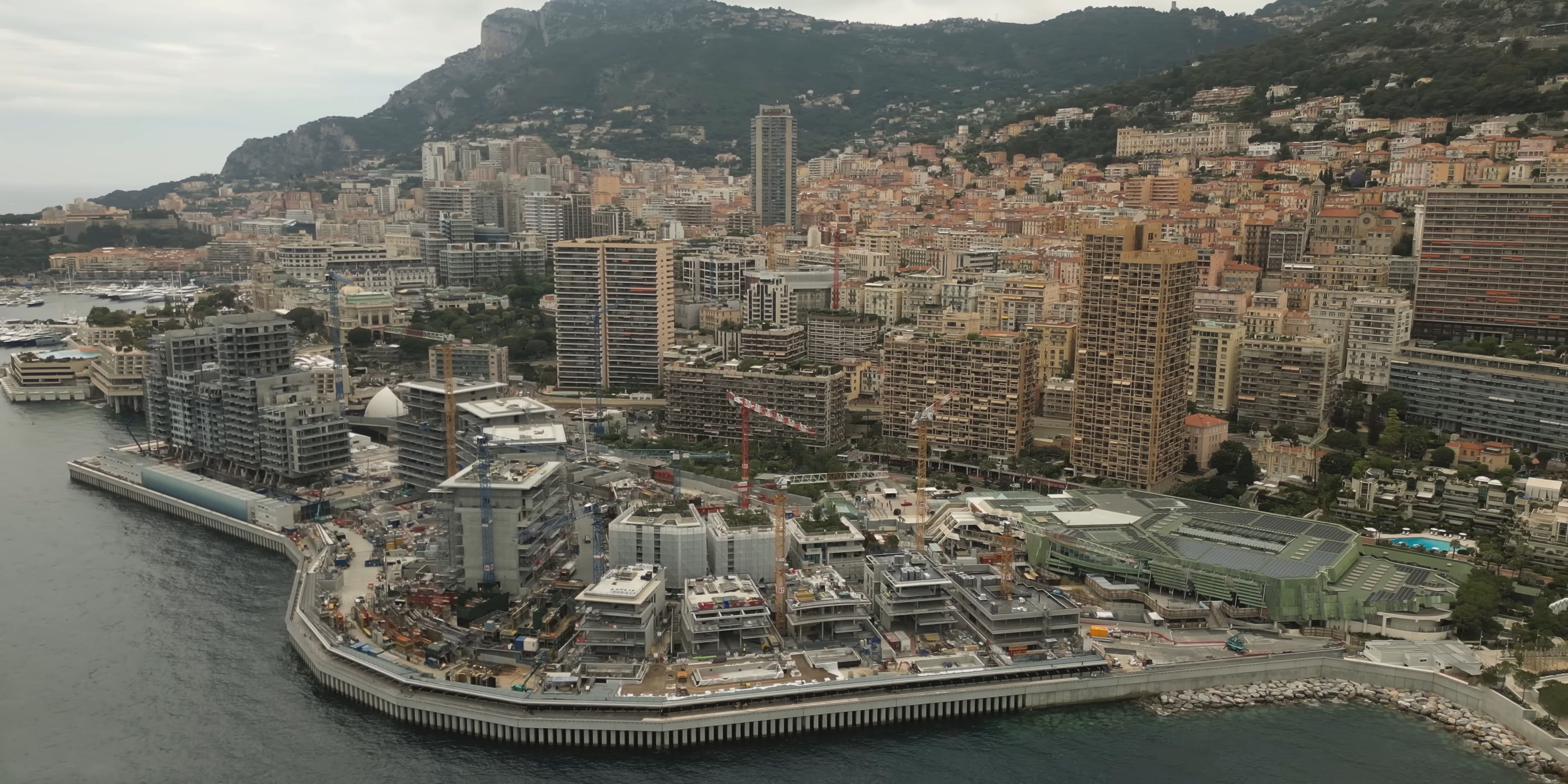
In the 2020s completion was nearing on a small apartment building and a few houses on the coast.

On 29 February 2020, Monaco announced its first case of COVID-19, a man who was admitted to the Princess Grace Hospital Centre then transferred to Nice University Hospital in France. The virus was confirmed to have reached Monaco on 29 February 2020.

In the early 2020s there was international news about concerns over government financial accountability in Monaco.

On 28 March 2026, Pope Leo XIV visited Monaco. The visit was part of the ongoing, centuries-old ties that bind the Grimaldi dynasty, which has reigned over Monaco since 1297, to the Successors of Peter. It also aimed to strengthen the “long-standing and trusting” diplomatic relations, according to the press office of the Prince’s Palace, between the two smallest states in the world.

== See also ==
- History of Europe
- History of France
- History of Italy
- List of rulers of Monaco
- Politics of Monaco
- Monaco at the Olympics

== Sources ==
- "Principality and Diocese of Monaco". The Catholic Encyclopedia.
- "History of Monaco". Gale Force of Monaco. Archived from the original on April 18, 2005.
- Velde, François. "Monaco". Heraldica.
