= Education in Białystok =

This is a sub-article to Białystok

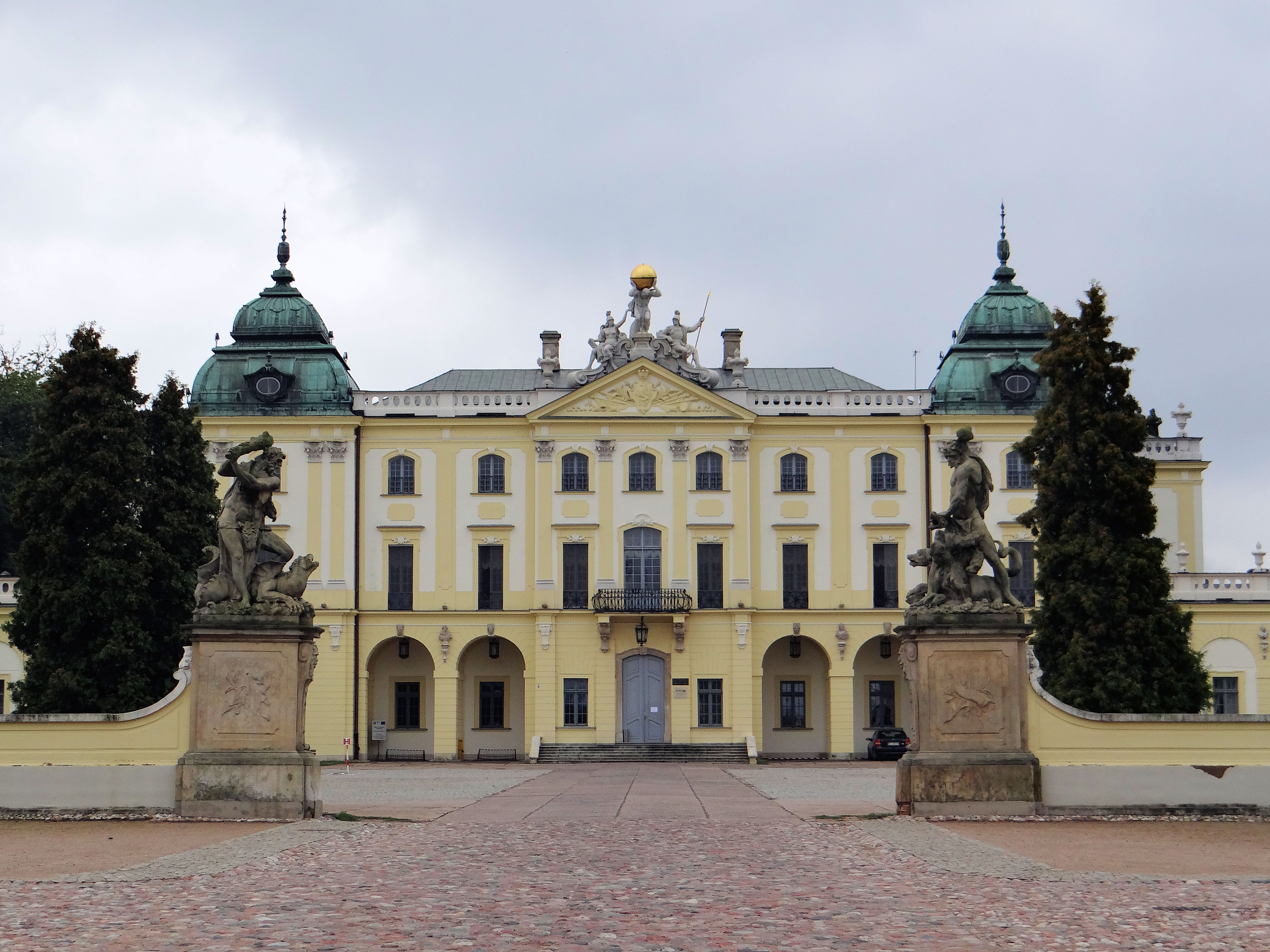
Branicki Palace, seat of the Medical University of Białystok

Białystok, Poland, is home to one principal public university (University of Białystok) and two other public specialist universities (Białystok Technical University and Medical University of Białystok). Some institutions, such as Musical Academy in Bialystok, are branches of their parent institutions in other cities, usually in Warsaw. Since the fall of communism many private-funded institutions of higher educations were founded and their number is still increasing.

== History ==
In 1802, as a result of the educational reform in the Russian Empire, the first modern school which was established in 1777, was transformed into the Białystok Gymnasium, which allowed admission to higher education. The Białystok Gymnasium until the Second Partition was a three-grade academic sub-departmental school of the Grodno Department of the Commission of National Education.

In 1808, the gymnasium was moved to a brick building at the intersection of Warszawska and Pałacowa streets. The location changed again in 1858, when the gymnasium moved to the current building of the 6th High School – a classicist palace at 9 Kościelna Street (today 8 Warszawska Street). The building, built in 1831, had previously housed, among others, the headquarters of the Russian administration and a military hospital.

After the annexation of the Belostok Oblast to the Russian Empire, it was a secular district school. In the school year 1834/1835, the Białystok Gymnasium underwent changes to its curriculum. All subjects, except for Catholic religion, began to be taught in Russian. This entailed the need to bring in "government teachers". In 1840, as a result of further Russification, Polish was also abolished as a subject. In addition, in the school year 1834/1835, two new classes were created: the introductory class and the seventh. The introductory class served as another elementary school in the city with 30-40 students. The first three grammar school classes officially formed the district school. In 1843 When the Belostok Oblast was liquidated and incorporated into the Grodno Governorate, the Białystok School Directorate was also liquidated. By 1850, the Białystok schools were incorporated into the Belarusian Academic District.

Following Russia's defeat in the Crimean War a policy of Post-Sevastopol thaw was implemented by Tsar Alexander II of Russia. As a result, among other things, Polish language lessons were reintroduced in the Białystok gymnasium, and free conversations in Polish were permitted at the Institute of Noble Maidens during breaks and during visits from a priest.

Graduates of the Białystok Gymnasium include Ludwik Zamenhof, the creator of the Esperanto language, and Ignacy Hryniewiecki, the assassin of Tsar Alexander II of Russia.

According to the 1897 census, 48% of Białystok's residents could not read. In 1912, the City Council passed a resolution to introduce universal education. At that time, there were 11 two-grade church-parish and public schools, 2 evangelical schools, a railway school and about 20 private schools, including cheders. There were also six grammar schools and two commercial schools. It was possible to acquire knowledge in Polish at secret classes and at various courses.

The possibility of establishing Polish schools appeared in Białystok only in 1915, after the Germans took over the city. In December of that year, the Society for the Aid of Polish Schools was established, led by Stanisław Halko. He managed to establish, together with the contribution of Michał Motoszko, the first primary school in the city (since 1831) with Polish as the language of instruction. It was located in a rented private building at 13 Kraszewskiego Street. At the time of liberation in February 1919, there were 5 public primary schools in Białystok, in 1922 their number increased to 14 and in 1935 to 16. Due to difficult housing conditions and a large number of children at risk of tuberculosis, the education authorities decided to open an open-air school, the first of its kind in the country. In 1925-1939, the city government managed to build only four modern schools at Gdańska, Palacowa, Wiatrakowa and Grunwaldzka Streets. There were three state grammar schools in Białystok. The two oldest were established in 1919: at 9 Kościelna Street (today's 8 Warszawska) and 1 Mickiewicza Street. According to 1939 statistics, there were still seven private secondary schools and high schools in Białystok, four of which had full rights of state schools.

Kindergarten active during the Second Polish Republic:

| Kindergarten | Location | Additional information |
|---|---|---|
| Przedszkole Anny Halpern | Jurowiecka 17 | |
| Przedszkole B. Benkowiczówny | 4 Sienkiewicza | |
| Przedszkole D. Wołobrzyńskiej | 6 Nowy Świat | |
| Przedszkole im. Jaldut | 41c Piłsudskiego | Jewish, Tarbut organization |
| Przedszkole Józefy Głuszkowskiej | 13 Kilińskiego | |
| Przedszkole im. "Mendele" | 6 Kościelna | Jewish, Zjednoczonych Szkół Żydowskich organization |
| Przedszkole Koła Białostockiej "Rodziny Wojskowej" | 41c Piłsudskiego | |
| Przedszkole Michaliny Wolfke | 10 Modlińska | |
| Przedszkole przy Ochronie Miejskiej | 10 Dąbrowskiego | Municipal |
| Przedszkole Sory Kaleckiej | 34a Sienkiewicza | Jewish |
| Przedszkole Społeczne im. Młodziezy P.C.K | 6 Żółtkowska | |
| Przedszkole S. Pomeranc | 50 Piłsudskiego | Jewish |
| Przedszkole T. Głasztejnówny | 28 Nowy Świat | Jewish |

Elementary schools active during the Second Polish Republic:

| School name | Location | Additional information |
|---|---|---|
| Szkola nr 1 | 2a Palacowa | |
| Szkola nr 2 | 29 Sw. Rocha | |
| Szkola nr 3 | 29 Gdanska Street | Branch at 25 Nowowarszawska |
| Szkola nr 4 | 61 Sienkiewicza | |
| Szkola nr 5 | 3 Palacowa | |
| Szkola nr 7 | 1 Antoniuk Fabryczny | |
| Szkola nr 8 | 13 Kraszewskiego | |
| Szkola nr 9 | 15b Piłsudskiego | |
| Szkola nr 10 | 46 Pierackiego | |
| Szkola nr 11 | 33 Mazowiecka | |
| Szkola nr 12 | 8 Polna | |
| Szkola nr 15 | 46 Piłsudskiego | |
| Szkola nr 16 | 26 Brukowa | |
| Szkola nr 17 specjalna dla niedorozwinietych | 3 Mazowiecka | |
| Szkola nr 18 | 6 Szosa Zoltkowska | |
| Szkola Lejzera Eksztejna | 49 Kupiecka | Jewish |
| Publiczna Szkola Powszechna im. Juliusza Slowackiego | 2a Zwirki i Wigury | |
| Publiczna Szkola Powszechna im. Marszalka Jozefa Pilsudskiego | 16 Wiatrakowa | |

State Gimnazjum

| Gymnasium name | Location | Additional information |
|---|---|---|
| Gimnazjum Meskie im. Krola Zygmunta Augusta | 9 Kościelna | Nowadays 8 Warszawska |
| Gimnazjum Meskie im. Marszalka Jozefa Pilsudskiego | 63 Pierackiego | |
| Gimnazjum Zenskie im. Ksiezny Anny Jablonkowskiej | 1 Mickiewicza | |

State general liceums:

| Liceum name | Location | Additional information |
|---|---|---|
| Liceum Humanistyczne przy Gimnazjum im. Krola Zygmunta Augusta | 9 Koscielna | Nowadays 8 Warszawska |
| Liceum Humanistyczne przy Gimnazjum im. Ksiezny Anny Jabłonowskiej | 1 Mickiewicza | |
| Liceum Matematyczno-Przyrodnicze przy Gimnazjum Meskie im. Marszalka Jozefa Pilsudskiego | 63 Pierackiego | |

== Public-funded institutes of higher education ==
=== University of Białystok ===
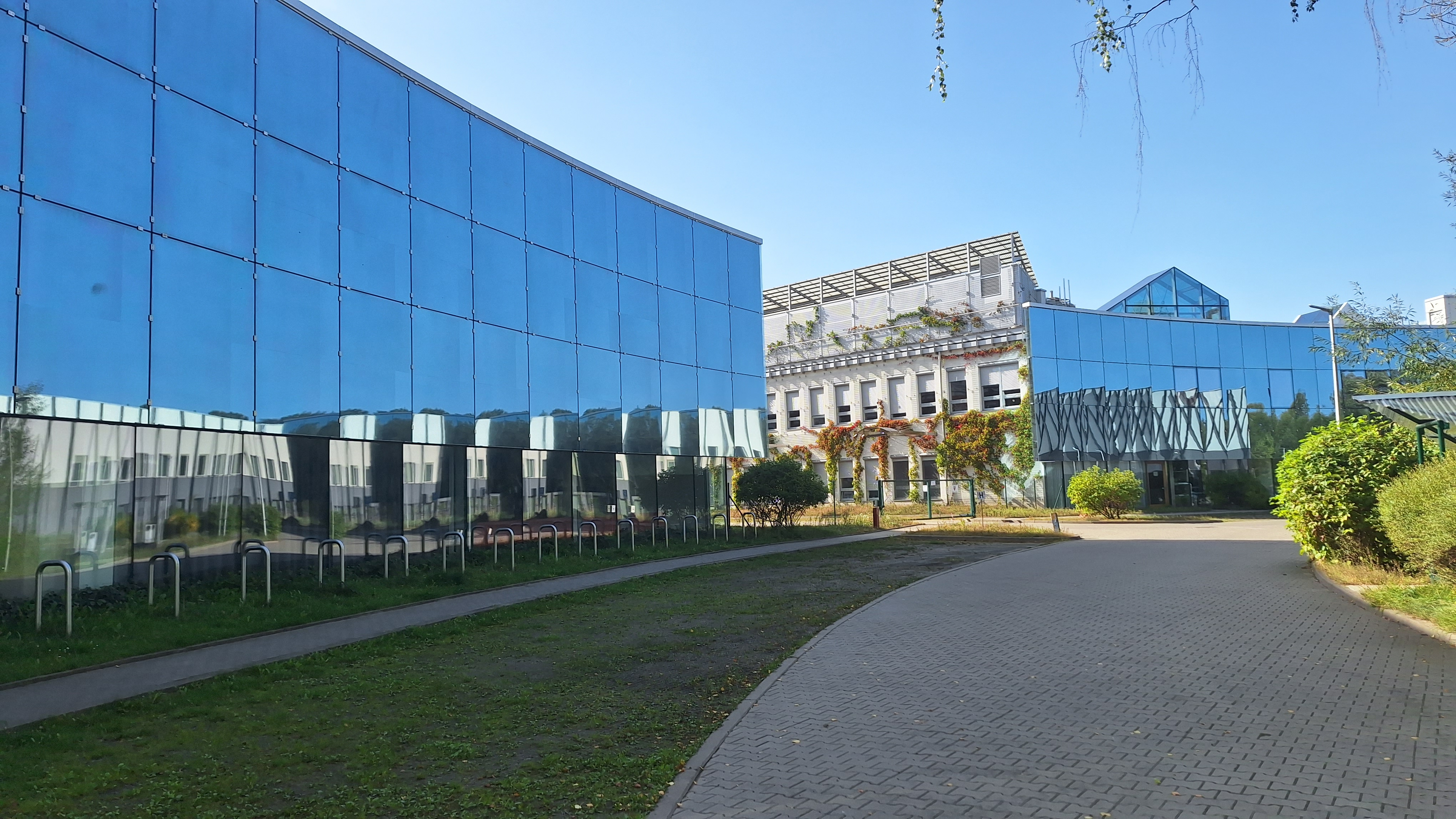
Campus of the University of Białystok

The University of Białystok was created under the Act of Sejm of the Republic of Poland on June 19, 1997 from the Branch of Warsaw University after 29 years of its existence. The academic potential and scope of the new University’s activities have contributed to its present position as one of the biggest and most important academic centers in the Northern Eastern Poland. Though now an independent academic center, The University of Bialystok still maintains scientific and personal connections with Warsaw University.

=== Białystok Technical University ===
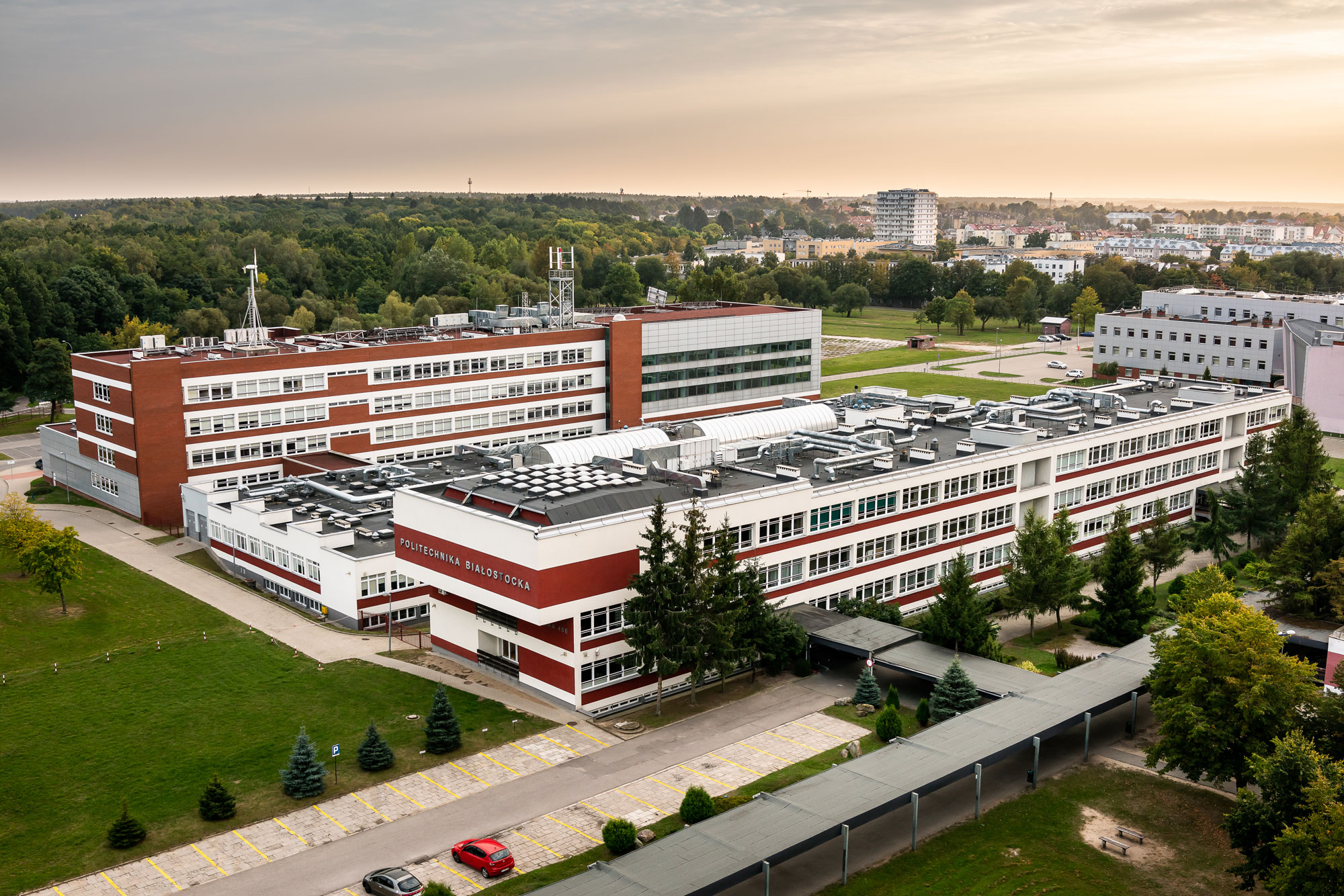
Campus of the Bialystok University of Technology

Białystok Technical University, the first technical college in Białystok, was opened on December 1, 1949 as a Private Evening Engineering College with the departments of Mechanical and Electrical Engineering, and nationalised in 1951, Bialystok University of Technology acquired its university status in 1974. It is the largest university of its kind in Poland’s north-eastern region.

=== Other ===
- Medical University of Białystok
- Musical Academy in Białystok (Akademia Muzyczna w Białymstoku) http://chopin.man.bialystok.pl
- Akademia Teatralna
- Archidiecezjalne wyższe Seminarium Duchowne
- Instytut Nauk Politycznych (Filia w Białymstoku)
- Nauczycielskie Kolegium Rewalidacji i Resocjalizacji
- Papieski Wydział Teologiczny (Studium Teologii)

== Private institutes of higher education ==
- Białystok School of Public Administration (Wyższa Szkoła Administracji Publicznej)
- Białystok Institute of Cosmetology (Wyższa Szkoła Kosmetologii w Białymstoku)
- Academy of Economics in Białystok (Wyższa Szkoła Ekonomiczna w Białymstoku)
- Academy of Finance and Management in Białystok (Wyższa Szkoła Finansów i Zarządzania w Białymstoku)
- Academy of Mathematics and Consumer IT (Wyższa Szkoła Matematyki i Informatyki Użytkowej)
- Niepaństwowa Wyższa Szkoła Pedagogiczna
- Academy of Management in Bialystok (Wyższa Szkoła Menedżerska)
- Niepubliczne Nauczycielskie Kolegium Języków Obcych
- Nauczycielskie Kolegium Języków Obcych "Inter - Lingua"
- Wyższa Szkoła Gospodarowania Nieruchomościami (Bialystok branch)
- Academy of Physical Education and Tourism in Bialystok (Wyższa Szkoła Wychowania Fizyczneo i Turystyki w Białymstoku)

== High schools ==
- VI High School - King Sigismund Augustus
- Zinaida Khvolesova Jewish Girls' High School
