= 2005 in Europe =

This is a list of 2005 events that occurred in Europe.

== Incumbents ==
- Albania
  - President – Alfred Moisiu, President of Albania (2002–2007)
  - Prime Minister –
    1. Fatos Nano, Prime Minister of Albania (2002–2005)
    2. Sali Berisha, Prime Minister of Albania (2005–2013)
- Andorra
  - Monarchs –
    - French Co-Prince – Jacques Chirac, French Co-prince of Andorra (1995–2007)
      - Co-Prince's Representative – Philippe Massoni (2002–2007)
    - Episcopal Co-Prince – Joan Enric Vives Sicília, Episcopal Co-prince of Andorra (2003–present)
      - Co-Prince's Representative – Nemesi Marqués Oste (1993–2012)
  - Prime Minister –
    1. Marc Forné Molné, Head of Government of Andorra (1994–2005)
    2. Albert Pintat, Head of Government of Andorra (2005–2009)
- Armenia
  - President – Robert Kocharyan, President of Armenia (1998–2008)
  - Prime Minister – Andranik Margaryan, Prime Minister of Armenia (2000–2007)
- Austria
  - President – Heinz Fischer, Federal President of Austria (2004–2016)
  - Chancellor – Wolfgang Schüssel, Federal Chancellor of Austria (2000–2007)
- Azerbaijan
  - President – Ilham Aliyev, President of Azerbaijan (2003–present)
  - Prime Minister – Artur Rasizade, Prime Minister of Azerbaijan (2003–2018)
  - Nagorno-Karabakh (unrecognised, secessionist state)
    - President – Arkadi Ghukasyan, President of Nagorno-Karabakh (1997–2007)
    - Prime Minister – Anushavan Danielyan, Prime Minister of Nagorno-Karabakh (1999–2007)
- Belarus
  - President – Alexander Lukashenko, President of Belarus (1994–present)
  - Prime Minister – Sergei Sidorsky, Prime Minister of Belarus (2003–2010)
- Belgium
  - Monarch – Albert II, King of the Belgians (1993–2013)
  - Prime Minister – Guy Verhofstadt, Prime Minister of Belgium (1999–2008)
- Bosnia and Herzegovina
  - Head of State – Presidency of Bosnia and Herzegovina
    - Serb Member – Borislav Paravac (2003–2006; Chairman of the Presidency of Bosnia and Herzegovina, 2004–2005)
    - Bosniak Member – Sulejman Tihić (2002–2006)
    - Croat Member –
      1. Dragan Čović (2002–2005)
      2. Ivo Miro Jović (2005–2006; Chairman of the Presidency of Bosnia and Herzegovina, 2005–2006)
  - Prime Minister – Adnan Terzić, Chairman of the Council of Ministers of Bosnia and Herzegovina (2002–2007)
  - High Representative – Lord (Paddy) Ashdown, High Representative for Bosnia and Herzegovina (2002–2006)
- Bulgaria
  - President – Georgi Parvanov, President of Bulgaria (2002–2012)
  - Prime Minister –
    1. Simeon Saxe-Coburg-Gotha, Prime Minister of Bulgaria (2001–2005)
    2. Sergei Stanishev, Prime Minister of Bulgaria (2005–2009)
- Croatia
  - President – Stjepan Mesić, President of Croatia (2000–2010)
  - Prime Minister – Ivo Sanader, Prime Minister of Croatia (2003–2009)
- Cyprus
  - President – Tassos Papadopoulos, President of Cyprus (2003–2008)
  - Northern Cyprus (unrecognised, secessionist state)
    - President –
      1. Rauf Denktaş, President of Northern Cyprus (1976–2005)
      2. Mehmet Ali Talat, President of Northern Cyprus (2005–2010)
    - Prime Minister –
      1. Mehmet Ali Talat, Prime Minister of Northern Cyprus (2004–2005)
      2. Ferdi Sabit Soyer, Prime Minister of Northern Cyprus (2005–2009)
- Czech Republic
  - President – Václav Klaus, President of the Czech Republic (2003–2013)
  - Prime Minister –
    1. Stanislav Gross, Prime Minister of the Czech Republic (2004–2005)
    2. Jiří Paroubek, Prime Minister of the Czech Republic (2005–2006)
- Denmark
  - Monarch – Margrethe II, Queen of Denmark (1972–2024)
  - Prime Minister – Anders Fogh Rasmussen, Prime Minister of Denmark (2001–2009)
- Estonia
  - President – Arnold Rüütel, President of Estonia (2001–2006)
  - Prime Minister –
    1. Juhan Parts, Prime Minister of Estonia (2003–2005)
    2. Andrus Ansip, Prime Minister of Estonia (2005–2014)
- European Union
  - President of the European Commission – José Manuel Barroso
  - President of the Parliament – Josep Borrell
  - President of the European Council –
    1. Jean-Claude Juncker (January–June)
    2. Tony Blair (July–December)
  - Presidency of the Council of the EU –
    1. Luxembourg (January–July)
    2. United Kingdom (July–December)
- Finland
  - President – Tarja Halonen, President of Finland (2000–2012)
  - Prime Minister – Matti Vanhanen, Prime Minister of Finland (2003–2010)
- France
  - President – Jacques Chirac, President of France (1995–2007)
  - Prime Minister –
    1. Jean-Pierre Raffarin, Prime Minister of France (2002–2005)
    2. Dominique de Villepin, Prime Minister of France (2005–2007)
- Georgia
  - President – Mikheil Saakashvili, President of Georgia (2004–2007)
  - Prime Minister –
    1. Zurab Zhvania, Prime Minister of Georgia (2004–2005)
    2. Zurab Noghaideli, Prime Minister of Georgia (2005–2007)
  - Abkhazia (unrecognised, secessionist state)
    - President –
      1. Vladislav Ardzinba, President of Abkhazia (1990–2005) (Note: Abkhazia only declared independence in 1992.)
      2. Sergei Bagapsh, President of Abkhazia (2005–2011)
    - Prime Minister –
      1. Nodar Khashba, Prime Minister of Abkhazia (2004–2005)
      2. Alexander Ankvab, Prime Minister of Abkhazia (2005–2010)
  - South Ossetia (unrecognised, secessionist state)
    - President – Eduard Kokoity, President of South Ossetia (2001–2011)
    - Prime Minister –
      1. Igor Sanakoyev, Prime Minister of South Ossetia (2003–2005)
      2. Zurab Kokoyev, Acting Prime Minister of South Ossetia (2005)
      3. Yury Morozov, Prime Minister of South Ossetia (2005–2008)
- Germany
  - President – Horst Köhler, Federal President of Germany (2004–2010)
  - Chancellor –
    1. Gerhard Schröder, Federal Chancellor of Germany (1998–2005)
    2. Angela Merkel, Federal Chancellor of Germany (2005–2021)
- Greece
  - President –
    1. Konstantinos Stephanopoulos, President of Greece (1995–2005)
    2. Karolos Papoulias, President of Greece (2005–2015)
  - Prime Minister – Kostas Karamanlis, Prime Minister of Greece (2004–2009)
- Hungary
  - President –
    1. Ferenc Mádl, President of Hungary (2000–2005)
    2. László Sólyom, President of Hungary (2005–2010)
  - Prime Minister – Ferenc Gyurcsány, Prime Minister of Hungary (2004–2009)
- Iceland
  - President – Ólafur Ragnar Grímsson, President of Iceland (1996–2016)
  - Prime Minister – Halldór Ásgrímsson, Prime Minister of Iceland (2004–2006)
- Ireland
  - President – Mary McAleese, President of Ireland (1997–2011)
  - Prime Minister – Bertie Ahern, Taoiseach of Ireland (1997–2008)
- Italy
  - President – Carlo Azeglio Ciampi, President of Italy (1999–2006)
  - Prime Minister – Silvio Berlusconi, President of the Council of Ministers of Italy (2001–2006)
- Latvia
  - President – Vaira Vīķe-Freiberga, President of Latvia (1999–2007)
  - Prime Minister – Aigars Kalvītis, Prime Minister of Latvia (2004–2007)
- Liechtenstein
  - Monarch – Hans-Adam II, Prince Regnant of Liechtenstein (1989–present)
  - Regent – Hereditary Prince Alois, Regent of Liechtenstein (2004–present)
  - Prime Minister – Otmar Hasler, Head of Government of Liechtenstein (2001–2009)
- Lithuania
  - President – Valdas Adamkus, President of Lithuania (2004–2009)
  - Prime Minister – Algirdas Brazauskas, Prime Minister of Lithuania (2001–2006)
- Luxembourg
  - Monarch – Henri, Grand Duke of Luxembourg (2000–present)
  - Prime Minister – Jean-Claude Juncker, Prime Minister of Luxembourg (1995–2013)
- Macedonia
  - President – Branko Crvenkovski, President of Macedonia (2004–2009)
  - Prime Minister – Vlado Bučkovski, President of the Government of Macedonia (2004–2006)
- Malta
  - President – Eddie Fenech Adami, President of Malta (2004–2009)
  - Prime Minister – Lawrence Gonzi, Prime Minister of Malta (2004–2013)
- Moldova
  - President – Vladimir Voronin, President of Moldova (2001–2009)
  - Prime Minister – Vasile Tarlev, Prime Minister of Moldova (2001–2008)
  - Transnistria (unrecognised, secessionist state)
    - President – Igor Smirnov, President of Transnistria (1990–2011) (Note: Transnistria only declared independence in 1991.)
- Monaco
  - Monarch –
    1. Rainier III, Sovereign Prince of Monaco (1949–2005)
    2. Albert II, Sovereign Prince of Monaco (2005–present)
  - Regent – Hereditary Prince Albert, Regent of Monaco (2005)
  - Prime Minister –
    1. Patrick Leclercq, Minister of State of Monaco (2000–2005)
    2. Jean-Paul Proust, Minister of State of Monaco (2005–2010)
- Kingdom of the Netherlands
  - Monarch – Beatrix, Queen of the Netherlands (1980–2013)
  - Netherlands (constituent country of the Kingdom of the Netherlands)
    - Prime Minister – Jan Peter Balkenende, Prime Minister of the Netherlands (2002–2010)
  - Netherlands Antilles (constituent country of the Kingdom of the Netherlands)
    - see § North America
  - Aruba (constituent country of the Kingdom of the Netherlands)
    - see § North America
- Norway
  - Monarch – Harald V, King of Norway (1991–present)
  - Regent – Crown Prince Haakon, Regent of Norway (2005)
  - Prime Minister –
    1. Kjell Magne Bondevik, Prime Minister of Norway (2001–2005)
    2. Jens Stoltenberg, Prime Minister of Norway (2005–2013)
- Poland
  - President –
    1. Aleksander Kwaśniewski, President of Poland (1995–2005)
    2. Lech Kaczyński, President of Poland (2005–2010)
  - Prime Minister –
    1. Marek Belka, Chairman of the Council of Ministers of Poland (2004–2005)
    2. Kazimierz Marcinkiewicz, Chairman of the Council of Ministers of Poland (2005–2006)
- Portugal
  - President – Jorge Sampaio, President of Portugal (1996–2006)
  - Prime Minister –
    1. Pedro Santana Lopes, Prime Minister of Portugal (2004–2005)
    2. José Sócrates, Prime Minister of Portugal (2005–2011)
- Romania
  - President – Traian Băsescu, President of Romania (2004–2014)
  - Prime Minister – Călin Popescu-Tăriceanu, Prime Minister of Romania (2004–2008)
- Russia
  - President – Vladimir Putin, President of Russia (1999–2008)
  - Prime Minister – Mikhail Fradkov, Chairman of the Government of Russia (2004–2007)
- San Marino
  - Captains-Regent –
    1. Giuseppe Arzilli and Roberto Raschi, Captains Regent of San Marino (2004–2005)
    2. Fausta Morganti and Cesare Gasperoni, Captains Regent of San Marino (2005)
    3. Claudio Muccioli and Antonello Bacciocchi, Captains Regent of San Marino (2005–2006)
- Serbia and Montenegro
  - President – Svetozar Marović, President of Serbia and Montenegro (2003–2006)
  - Prime Minister – Svetozar Marović, Prime Minister of Serbia and Montenegro (2003–2006)
  - Kosovo (Self-Governing Entity under UN administration)
    - President – Ibrahim Rugova, President of Kosovo (2002–2006)
    - Prime Minister –
      1. Ramush Haradinaj, Prime Minister of Kosovo (2004–2005)
      2. Adem Salihaj, Acting Prime Minister of Kosovo (2005–2005)
      3. Bajram Kosumi, Prime Minister of Kosovo (2005–2006)
    - UN Special Representative – Søren Jessen-Petersen, Special Representative of the UN Secretary-General for Kosovo (2004–2006)
- Slovakia
  - President – Ivan Gašparovič, President of Slovakia (2004–2014)
  - Prime Minister – Mikuláš Dzurinda, Prime Minister of Slovakia (1998–2006)
- Slovenia
  - President – Janez Drnovšek, President of Slovenia (2002–2007)
  - Prime Minister – Janez Janša, Prime Minister of Slovenia (2004–2008)
- Spain
  - Monarch – Juan Carlos I, King of Spain (1975–2014)
  - Prime Minister – José Luis Rodríguez Zapatero, President of the Government of Spain (2004–2011)
- Sweden
  - Monarch – Carl XVI Gustaf, King of Sweden (1973–present)
  - Prime Minister – Göran Persson, Prime Minister of Sweden (1996–2006)
- Switzerland
  - Council – Federal Council of Switzerland (Note: The seven-member Swiss Federal Council is head of state and government collectively. As a party to the Council, the president serves solely in a primus inter pares capacity for one year.)
    - Members – Moritz Leuenberger (1995–2010), Pascal Couchepin (1998–2009), Joseph Deiss (1999–2006), Samuel Schmid (2000–2008; President of Switzerland, 2005), Micheline Calmy-Rey (2002–2011), Christoph Blocher (2003–2007), and Hans-Rudolf Merz (2003–2010)
- Turkey
  - President – Ahmet Necdet Sezer, President of Turkey (2000–2007)
  - Prime Minister – Recep Tayyip Erdoğan, Prime Minister of Turkey (2003–2014)
- Ukraine
  - President –
    1. Leonid Kuchma, President of Ukraine (1994–2005)
    2. Viktor Yushchenko, President of Ukraine (2005–2010)
  - Prime Minister –
    1. Viktor Yanukovych, Prime Minister of Ukraine (2002–2005)
    2. Mykola Azarov, Acting Prime Minister of Ukraine (2005)
    3. Yulia Tymoshenko, Prime Minister of Ukraine (2005)
    4. Yuriy Yekhanurov, Prime Minister of Ukraine (2005–2006)
- United Kingdom
  - Monarch – Elizabeth II, Queen of the United Kingdom (1952–present)
  - Prime Minister – Tony Blair, Prime Minister of the United Kingdom (1997–2007)
  - Isle of Man (Crown dependency of the United Kingdom)
    - Lieutenant-Governor –
      1. Ian Macfadyen, Lieutenant Governor of the Isle of Man (2000–2005)
      2. Mike Kerruish, Acting Lieutenant Governor of the Isle of Man (2005)
      3. Sir Paul Haddacks, Lieutenant Governor of the Isle of Man (2005–2011)
    - Chief Minister – Donald Gelling, Chief Minister of the Isle of Man (2004–2006)
  - Guernsey (Crown dependency of the United Kingdom)
    - Lieutenant-Governor –
      1. Sir John Foley, Lieutenant Governor of Guernsey (2000–2005)
      2. Sir Geoffrey Rowland, Acting Lieutenant Governor of Guernsey (2005)
      3. Sir Fabian Malbon, Lieutenant Governor of Guernsey (2005–2011)
    - Chief Minister – Laurie Morgan, Chief Minister of Guernsey (2004–2007)
  - Jersey (Crown dependency of the United Kingdom)
    - Lieutenant-Governor – Sir John Cheshire, Lieutenant Governor of Jersey (2001–2006)
    - Chief Minister – Frank Walker, Chief Minister of Jersey (2005–2008)
  - Gibraltar (Overseas Territory of the United Kingdom)
    - Governor – Sir Francis Richards, Governor of Gibraltar (2003–2006)
    - Chief Minister – Peter Caruana, Chief Minister of Gibraltar (1996–2011)
- Vatican City
  - Monarch –
    1. Pope John Paul II, Sovereign of Vatican City (1978–2005)
    2. Cardinal Eduardo Martínez Somalo and Cardinal Joseph Ratzinger; interim Government during sede vacante (2005)
    3. Pope Benedict XVI, Sovereign of Vatican City (2005–2013)
  - Head of Government – Cardinal Edmund Szoka, President of the Governorate of Vatican City (1997–2006)
  - Holy See (sui generis subject of public international law)
    - Secretary of State – Cardinal Angelo Sodano, Cardinal Secretary of State (1990–2006)

== Events ==
=== April ===
April 24 – Fernando Alonso wins the San Marino Grand Prix against Michael Schumacher, starting the Alonso–Schumacher rivalry

=== October ===
October 3 – Accession negotiations for full membership in the European Union between Croatia and Turkey have officially started.

== See also ==
- 2005 in the European Union
- List of state leaders in Europe in 2005
