= Marek Druzdzel =

Polish-American computer scientist

- Born: Marek Józef Druzdzel
- Education: Delft University of Technology, Carnegie Mellon University
- Known for: Bayesian networks, Probabilistic reasoning, GeNIe & SMILE software
- Awards: Fulbright Scholar (2009–10, 2016–17)
- Scientific career
- Fields: Computer science, Artificial intelligence, Decision support systems
- Workplaces: University of Pittsburgh, Bialystok University of Technology, BayesFusion

Marek Druzdzel is a Polish-American computer scientist known for his contributions to decision support systems, Bayesian networks, and probabilistic reasoning.

== Education ==
Druzdzel obtained two Master of Science degrees from Delft University of Technology in the Netherlands: the first in Technical Mathematics and Informatics in 1985, and the second in Computer Engineering in 1987. He received his Ph.D. in Engineering and Public Policy from Carnegie Mellon University in 1992. In 2009, he was awarded a habilitation (D.Sc.) by the Institute of Computer Science of the Polish Academy of Sciences.

== Career ==
Druzdzel began his academic career at the University of Pittsburgh in 1993, where he held multiple academic roles, including Associate Professor in the School of Information Sciences. During his time there, he collaborated with Clark Glymour on research examining college dropout rates in the United States. Earlier, while completing his Ph.D. at Carnegie Mellon University, Druzdzel worked with Herbert A. Simon, a Nobel Prize-winning economist and cognitive psychologist, and they co-authored a paper on decision theory and causality.

He became a visiting professor at Białystok University of Technology in 2006 and was appointed full professor there in 2009. In 2015, he co-founded BayesFusion, LLC, where he continues to contribute to the development of decision support tools, including the GeNIe and SMILE software platforms used for Bayesian network modeling.

Throughout his academic tenure, Druzdzel has taught a wide range of subjects related to computer science and information systems including Data Analytics, Knowledge Representation, the Semantic Web, and Decision Support Systems, among others.

== Research ==
Druzdzel’s research focuses on decision-making under uncertainty, probabilistic graphical models, and the development of intelligent decision support systems. He is particularly known for his work on Bayesian networks, including both theoretical contributions and practical applications in areas such as medicine, engineering, and public policy. He has co-developed the GeNIe and SMILE platforms, which are widely used tools for modeling and analyzing probabilistic systems.

He has explored qualitative reasoning techniques that allow systems to function effectively in the absence of precise numerical probabilities. He has also addressed the challenge of model elicitation, investigating how to derive accurate probabilistic parameters from expert knowledge and data.

== Selected publications ==
- Valenza, Gaetano; Gentili, Claudio; Lanatà, Antonio; Scilingo, Enzo Pasquale (2013). "Mood recognition in bipolar patients through the PSYCHE platform: Preliminary evaluations and perspectives". Artificial Intelligence in Medicine. 57 (1): 49–58. doi:10.1016/j.artmed.2012.12.001. PMID 23332576.
- Zagorecki, Adam; Druzdzel, Marek J. (2013). "Knowledge Engineering for Bayesian Networks: How Common Are Noisy-MAX Distributions in Practice?". IEEE Transactions on Systems, Man, and Cybernetics: Systems. 43 (1): 186–195. Bibcode:2013ITSMC..43..186Z. doi:10.1109/TSMCA.2012.2189880.
- Yuan, Changhe; Druzdzel, Marek J. (2006). "Importance sampling algorithms for Bayesian networks: Principles and performance". Mathematical and Computer Modelling. 43 (9–10): 1189–1207. doi:10.1016/j.mcm.2005.05.020.
- Cheng, J.; Druzdzel, M. J. (2000). "AIS-BN: An Adaptive Importance Sampling Algorithm for Evidential Reasoning in Large Bayesian Networks". Journal of Artificial Intelligence Research. 13: 155–188. arXiv:1106.0253. doi:10.1613/jair.764.
- Druzdzel, M.J.; Van Der Gaag, L.C. (2000). "Building probabilistic networks: "Where do the numbers come from?" guest editors' introduction". IEEE Transactions on Knowledge and Data Engineering. 12 (4): 481–486. Bibcode:2000ITKDE..12..481D. doi:10.1109/TKDE.2000.868901.
- Babichenko, Dmitriy; Druzdzel, Marek J.; Grieve, Lorin; Patel, Ravi; Velez, Jonathan; Neal, Taylor; McCray, James; Wallace, Rae-Djamaal; Jenkins, Sean (2016). "Designing the model patient: Data-driven virtual patients in medical education". 2016 IEEE International Conference on Serious Games and Applications for Health (SeGAH). pp. 1–8. doi:10.1109/SeGAH.2016.7586253. ISBN 978-1-5090-2210-6.

== Honors and awards ==
Druzdzel has been the recipient of two Fulbright U.S. Scholar grants. During the 2009–2010 and 2016–2017 academic years, he lectured at Białystok University of Technology as part of the Fulbright program, focusing on the application of probabilistic models in decision support systems.
