= 2005 in Monaco =

- Decades: 1980s; 1990s; 2000s; 2010s; 2020s
- See also: History of Monaco; List of years in Monaco

Events in the year 2005 in Monaco.

== Incumbents ==
- Monarch: Rainier III (died 6 April 2005) Albert II (succeeded Rainier III, his father, as Sovereign Prince)
- State Minister: Patrick Leclercq and Jean-Paul Proust

== Events ==
  - 22 May - Kimi Räikkönen won the Monaco Grand Prix.
- 1 June – Patrick Leclercq steps down as Minister of State. Jean-Paul Proust assumes the office.
- June/July – The Sovereign Prince officially acknowledged his paternity of Alexandre Grimaldi-Coste, who was at that time living in Villefranche-sur-Mer with his mother, Nicole Coste.
- 12 July – Albert II, Prince of Monaco attended a solemn Mass and received the keys to the city amid a fantastic celebration, involving fireworks and live music by U2 and Pink Floyd.

== Deaths ==
- 6 April – Rainier III died at the age of 81. Having assumed the throne on May 9, 1949, he was Europe's longest reigning monarch.

== See also ==
- 2005 in Europe
- City states
