= 2006 in Monaco =

- Decades: 1980s; 1990s; 2000s; 2010s; 2020s
- See also: History of Monaco; List of years in Monaco

Events in the year 2006 in Monaco.

== Incumbents ==
- Monarch: Albert II
- State Minister: Jean-Paul Proust

== Events ==
- February – The Sovereign Prince is seen being a spectator at the Opening Ceremony of the 2006 Winter Olympics, with a woman the media quickly identifies as South African, Olympic-class swimmer Charlene Wittstock, his future wife.
- May – Grand Prix Monaco Formula 1 held on 28 May 2006 at Circuit de Monaco. The winner was the Spanish driver Fernando Alonso racing with Renault.
- June – The Sovereign Prince officially acknowledged his paternity of Jazmin Grace Grimaldi, a 14-year-old girl living in California with her mother, Tamara Rotolo. Prince Albert also acknowledged his relationship with Charlene Wittstock; the Palace and media had begun to refer to as his "companion," with some in the press picking up the idea of "official companion."
- September – Monaco Yacht Show was held in Port Hercules from 20 to 23 September; in total 95 boats represented boat builders, shipyards and yacht brokers. It was evident that it was a Superyacht convention as the participant yachts reached up to 88 meters long, with the sailing yacht The Maltese Falcon.
- December - Monaco International Film Festival, with Angel Awards given to these films that do not focus on violence.

Festival dates 7th to 10th December 2006

== See also ==
- 2006 in Europe
- City states
