= 2003 in Monaco =

- Decades: 1980s; 1990s; 2000s; 2010s; 2020s
- See also: History of Monaco; List of years in Monaco

Events in the year 2003 in Monaco.

== Incumbents ==
- Monarch: Rainier III
- State Minister: Patrick Leclercq

== Events ==
- 26 May – Juan Pablo Montoya won the 2003 Monaco Grand Prix.

== See also ==
- 2003 in Europe
- City states
