= 2001 in Monaco =

- Decades: 1980s; 1990s; 2000s; 2010s; 2020s
- See also: History of Monaco; List of years in Monaco

Events in the year 2001 in Monaco.

== Incumbents ==
- Monarch: Rainier III
- State Minister: Patrick Leclercq

== Events ==
=== May ===
- 26 May – Michael Schumacher wins the 2001 Monaco Grand Prix.

=== June ===
- 25 June – Prince Rainier III addresses the National Council, stating that if Monaco did not join the Council of Europe, it would be the only country left outside shared European commitments to human rights.

=== September ===
- 11 September – Prince Rainier III sends a message of condolence to U.S. President George W. Bush following the terrorist attacks in New York and Washington, D.C.
- 20 September – Sovereign Ordinance No. 15.036 authorizes the Consul General of the United Kingdom to carry out consular functions in Monaco.
- 24 September – Monaco hosts the 36th Congress of the International Commission for the Scientific Exploration of the Mediterranean Sea (CIESM).

=== Unknown dates ===
- France threatens legislative action against Monaco over its failure to implement anti–money laundering laws.
- Prince Rainier III publicly defends Monaco's sovereignty and proposes to renegotiate the principality's ties with France.

== See also ==
- 2001 in Europe
- City states
