= 1998 in Monaco =

- Decades: 1970s; 1980s; 1990s; 2000s; 2010s
- See also: History of Monaco; List of years in Monaco

Events in the year 1998 in Monaco.

.

== Incumbents ==
- Monarch: Rainier III
- State Minister: Michel Lévêque

== Events ==
- 15 July – Camille Marie Kelly Gottlieb was born to Princess Stephanie of Monaco at Princess Grace Hospital Centre in La Colle, Monaco. Although she did not identify the father's name on the birth certificate, it was widely suspected, from the start, that Camille's father is Jean Raymond Gottlieb, and, indeed, Camille herself has acknowledged Gottlieb as her father. As her parents never married, Camille is not included in the line of succession to the Monegasque throne.
- 24 May – 1998 Monaco Grand Prix was a 78-lap race that took place at Circuit de Monaco. The winner was Mika Häkkinen. He recorded a Grand chelem, having taken pole position, led every lap of the race, and set fastest lap.

== See also ==
- 1998 in Europe
- City states
