= 2002 in Monaco =

- Decades: 1980s; 1990s; 2000s; 2010s; 2020s
- See also: History of Monaco; List of years in Monaco

Events from the year 2002 in Monaco.

== Incumbents ==
- Monarch: Rainier III
- State Minister: Patrick Leclercq

== Events ==
- 2 April – Section 1.249 of the Constitution of Monaco was revised and passed into law. This section concerns the Line of Succession to the Monegasque Throne.
- 26 May – David Coulthard won the Monaco Grand Prix.

== See also ==
- 2002 in Europe
- City states
