= 2004 in Monaco =

- Decades: 1980s; 1990s; 2000s; 2010s; 2020s
- See also: History of Monaco; List of years in Monaco

Events in the year 2004 in Monaco.

== Incumbents ==
- Monarch: Rainier III
- State Minister: Patrick Leclercq

== Events ==
- May
  - 23 May - Jarno Trulli won the Monaco Grand Prix.
  - Pierre Frolla broke the world record for freediving with his 123-meter plunge into the sea at Monaco.
  - AS Monaco FC was a UEFA Champions League finalist after defeating Rennes 4–1. However, they lost the championship to FC Porto.

== See also ==
- 2004 in Europe
- City states
