= 1999 in Monaco =

- Decades: 1970s; 1980s; 1990s; 2000s; 2010s
- See also: History of Monaco; List of years in Monaco

Events in the year 1999 in Monaco.

== Incumbents ==
- Monarch: Rainier III
- State Minister: Michel Lévêque

== Events ==
- 23 January – Princess Caroline of Monaco married Ernst August, Prince of Hanover in a civil ceremony at the Palace. It was also the 42nd birthday of the princess bride.
- 2 March – AS Monaco made it to the fourth qualifying round of the 1999-2000 UEFA Cup. They lost to RCD Mallorca, 4-1.
- 9 March – AS Monaco played a second match against RCD Mallorca, this time on their home turf at Stade Louis II in Fontvieille, and won, 1-0.
- 16 May – Michael Schumacher won the 1999 Monaco Grand Prix.
- 20 July – A daughter, Alexandra, was born to the Prince and Princess of Hanover. Prince Ernst was photographed by paparazzi urinating outside the hospital in Vöcklabruck.

== See also ==
- 1999 in Europe
- City states
