= 2000 in Monaco =

- Decades: 1980s; 1990s; 2000s; 2010s; 2020s
- See also: History of Monaco; List of years in Monaco

Events in the year 2000 in Monaco.

== Incumbents ==
- Monarch: Rainier III
- State Minister: Patrick Leclercq

== Events ==
- 27–28 May – 2000 Historic Grand Prix of Monaco is held.
- June – Ernst August von Hannover, husband of Princess Caroline of Monaco, caused an international incident, angering the Turkish government, by urinating on the Turkish Pavilion at the Expo 2000.
- 4 June – David Coulthard won the 2000 Monaco Grand Prix.

== See also ==
- 2000 in Europe
- City states
