= Ilaria Bacciocchi =

Sammarinese politician (born 1990)

Ilaria Bacciocchi (born 9 February 1990) is a Sammarinese Party of Socialists and Democrats politician, member of the Council of Twelves since 2024 and the Grand and General Council since 2024.

== Career ==
Bacciocchi was born on 9 February 1990 in Borgo Maggiore, San Marino, daughter of former Captain Regent Antonello Bacciocchi.

She was Party of Socialists and Democrats (PSD) candidate for Borgo Maggiore in the 2024 parliamentary election and got elected member of the Grand and General Council. As a politician, she has focused on social issues such as education for students with special needs, gender parity and the defence of quotas, stating that one-third of women on the Council is not enough.

On 22 July 2024 Bacciocchi was appointed by the Grand and General Council as member of the Council of Twelve. She is member of the PSD's leadership.
