= 2003 in Europe =

This is a list of events in 2003 that occurred in Europe.

== Incumbents ==
=== Albania ===
(Albania)

=== Andorra ===
(Andorra)

=== Armenia ===
(Armenia)

=== Austria ===
(Austria)

=== Azerbaijan ===
(Azerbaijan)

=== Belarus ===
(Belarus)

=== Belgium ===
(Belgium)

=== Bosnia and Herzegovina ===
(Bosnia and Herzegovina)

=== Bulgaria ===
(Bulgaria)

=== Croatia ===
(Croatia)

=== Cyprus ===
(Cyprus)

=== Czech Republic ===
(Czech Republic)

=== Denmark ===
(Denmark)

=== Estonia ===
(Estonia)

=== European Union ===
- President of the European Commission: Romano Prodi
- President of the Parliament: Pat Cox
- President of the European Council:
  - Costas Simitis (January–June)
  - Silvio Berlusconi (July–December)
- Presidency of the Council of the EU:
  - Greece (January–July)
  - Italy (July–December)

=== Finland ===
(Finland)

=== France ===
(France)

=== Georgia ===
(Georgia (country))

=== Germany ===
(Germany)

=== Greece ===
(Greece)

=== Holy See ===
(Holy See)

Pope: John Paul II

Secretary of State: Angelo Cardinal Sodano

Secretary of the Section for Relations With States: Archbishop Giovanni Lajolo

=== Hungary ===
(Hungary)

Prime Minister: Péter Medgyessy

President: Ferenc Mádl

=== Iceland ===
(Iceland)

=== Ireland ===
(Republic of Ireland)

=== Italy ===
(Italy)

=== Latvia ===
(Latvia)

=== Liechtenstein ===
(Liechtenstein)

=== Lithuania ===
(Lithuania)

=== Luxembourg ===
(Luxembourg)

=== Macedonia ===
(North Macedonia)

=== Malta ===
(Malta)

=== Moldova ===
(Moldova)

=== Monaco ===
(Monaco)

=== Netherlands ===
(Netherlands)

=== Norway ===
(Norway)

=== Poland ===
(Poland)

=== Portugal ===
(Portugal)

=== Romania ===
(Romania)

=== Russia ===
(Russia)

=== San Marino ===
(San Marino)

=== Serbia and Montenegro ===
(Serbia and Montenegro)

=== Slovakia ===
(Slovakia)

=== Slovenia ===
(Slovenia)

=== Spain ===
(Spain)

=== Sweden ===
(Sweden)

=== Switzerland ===
(Switzerland)

=== Turkey ===
(Turkey)

=== Ukraine ===
(Ukraine)

=== United Kingdom ===
(United Kingdom)

== Events ==
Date	Event	Location
April 16	The Białystok Institute of Cosmetology was founded.	Poland
June 13	The Czech European Union membership referendum was held.	Czech Republic
July 2	Coburg shooting took place.	Germany
August 11	A heat wave struck most of Europe.	Europe
September 10	Anna Lindh was stabbed.	Sweden
September 19	The Aegon Arena officially opened.	Slovakia
November 30	The Sammarinese local elections were held.	San Marino
December 20	Pasqual Maragall took office in the Maragall Government.	Spain
	The Dønnesfjord Church closed.	Norway

== Deaths ==
Date of Death	Person	Location of Birth
August 25	Hjalmar Pettersson (1906)	Sweden
September 11	Anna Lindh (1957)	Sweden

== See also ==
- 2003 in the European Union
- List of state leaders in 2003 § Europe
