= Decision Support Systems =

- Discipline: Information systems, management information systems
- Language: English
- Edited by: Andrew N. K. Chen, Victoria Y. Yoon

Publication details
- History: 1985–present
- Publisher: Elsevier
- Frequency: Monthly
- Open access: Hybrid
- Impact factor: 6.7 (2023)

Standard abbreviations
- ISO 4: Decis. Support Syst.

Indexing
- ISSN: 0167-9236 (print); 1873-5797 (web)
- LCCN: 00251102
- OCLC no.: 858347461

Links
- Journal homepage; Online archive

Decision Support Systems is a monthly peer-reviewed scientific journal covering research on theoretical and technical advancements in decision support systems, including topics such as foundations, functionality, interfaces, implementation, impacts, and evaluation. It is published by Elsevier and the editors-in-chief are Andrew N. K. Chen (University of Kansas) and Victoria Y. Yoon (Virginia Commonwealth University), while James R. Marsden (University of Connecticut) is an emeritus editor.

== Abstracting and indexing ==
The journal is abstracted and indexed in:

- Current Contents/Engineering, Computing & Technology
- EBSCO databases
- Ei Compendex
- Inspec
- ProQuest databases
- PsycINFO
- Science Citation Index Expanded
- Scopus

== Reception ==
The journal received an A* ranking (the highest) from the Australian Council of Professors and Heads of Information Systems. It is also included in the 2023 "Senior Scholars' List of Premier Journals" by the Association for Information Systems. According to the Journal Citation Reports, the journal has a 2023 impact factor of 6.7.
