= Akademia Podlaska in Białystok =

Coordinates: 53°08′42″N 23°04′37″E

- Akademia Podlaska w Białymstoku
- Type: Private
- Established: 1996
- Rector: dr. Marek Jasiński
- Location: al. Jana Pawła II 91, Białystok, Poland
- Website: apwb.pl Building details
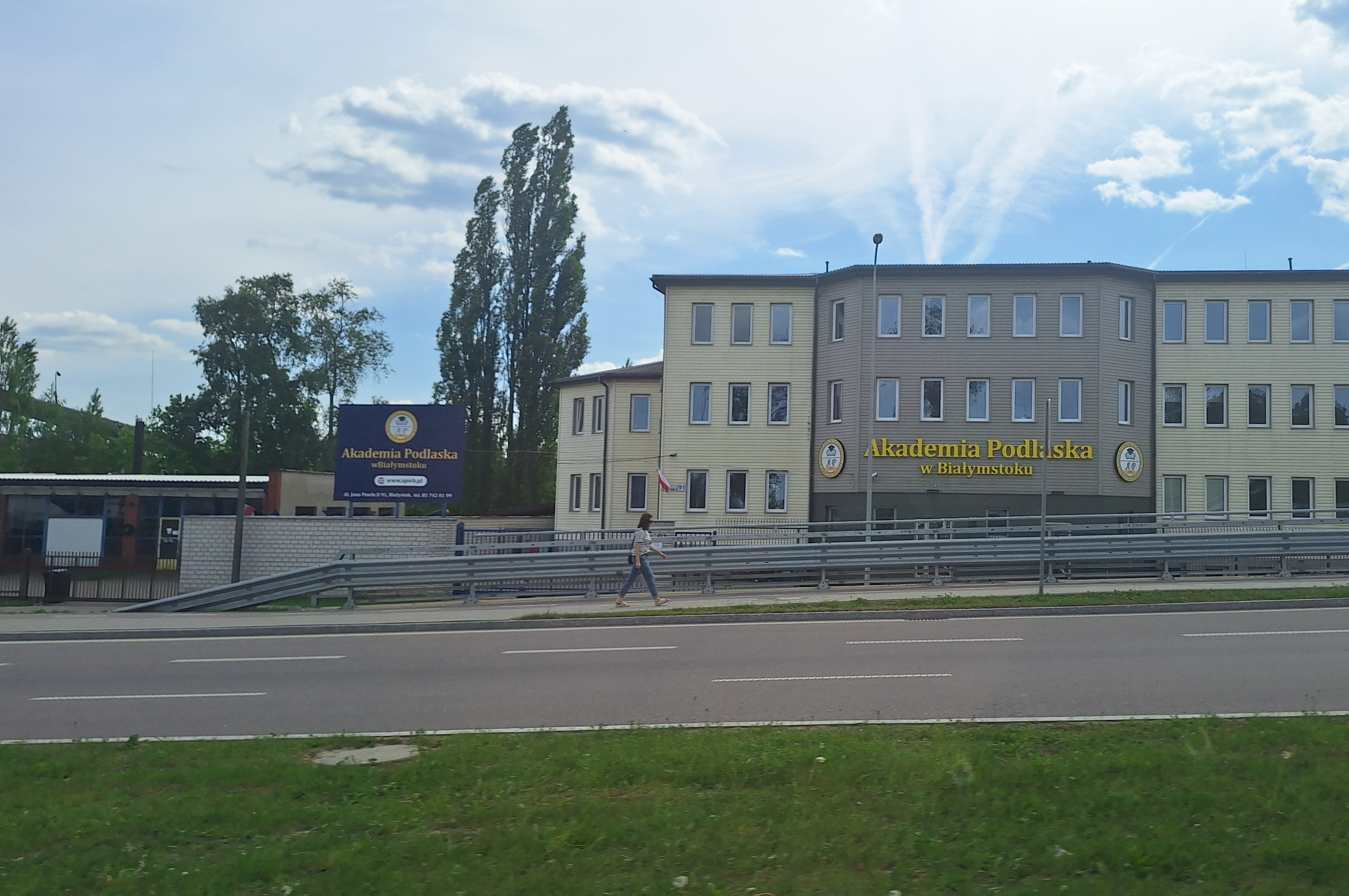

Akademia Podlaska in Białystok (Polish: Akademia Podlaska w Białymstoku - Akademia Nauk Stosowanych) is a private institution of higher education in Białystok, Poland. It was founded in 1996 as the Non-State Higher School of Pedagogy (Polish: Niepaństwowa Wyższa Szkoła Pedagogiczna. It offers courses in pedagogy, psychology and internal security at bachelor and master's degree and also postgraduate studies. On 14 November 2023 it changed to its current name in accordance with the decision of the Minister of Education, Przemysław Czarnek.

== School authorities ==
- Marek Jasiński, PhD, rector
- Dorota Agata Popławska, PhD, dean of the Faculty of Educational Sciences
- Leontyna Jakoniuk, chancellor
- Maria Kwaśniewska
- Olga Kamińska
