= Zinaida Khvolesova Jewish Girls' High School =

Former Jewish school in Białystok, Poland

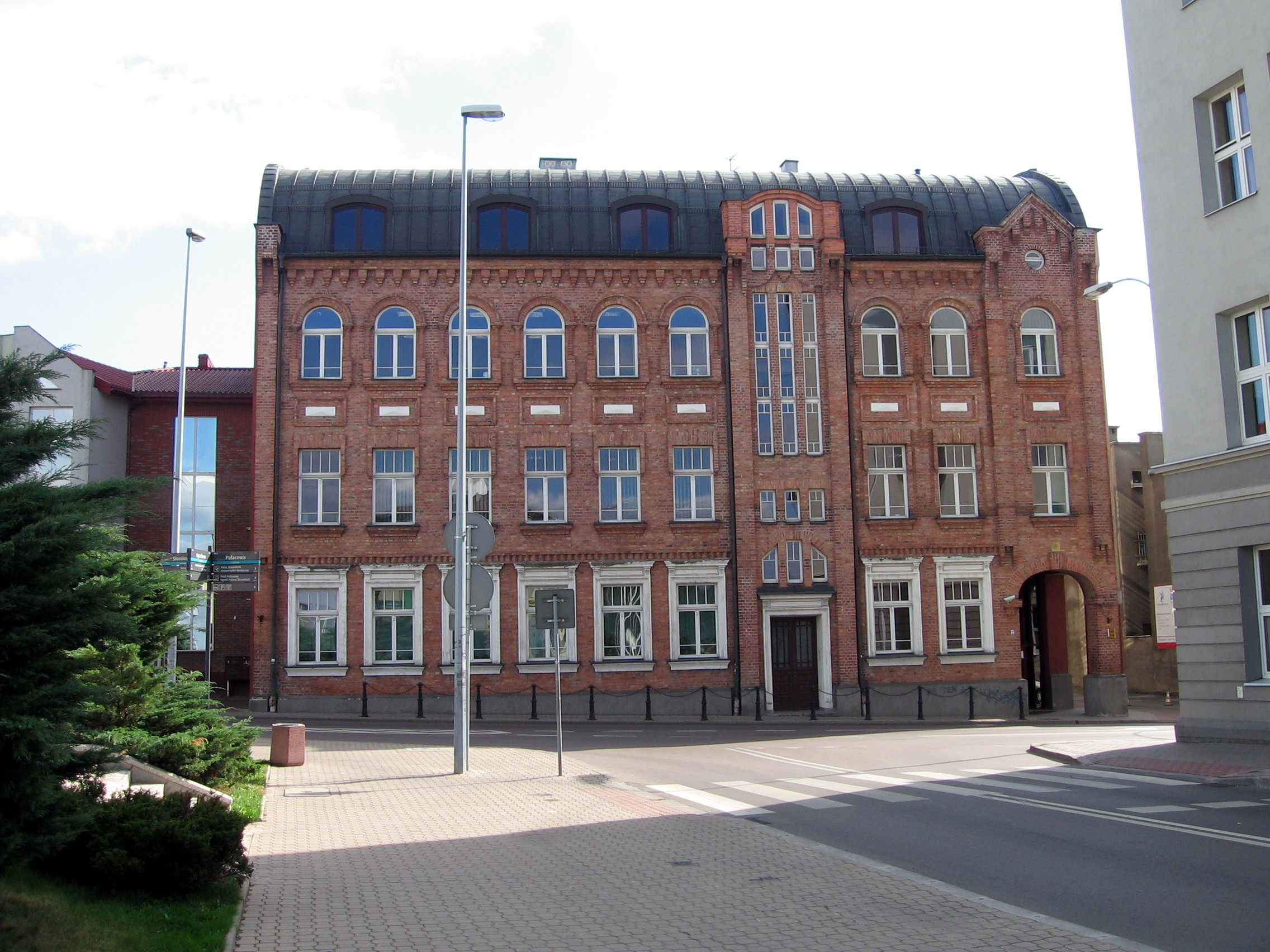
Former school building at Pałacowa 3

Zinaida Khvolesova Jewish Girls' High School is a girls school founded in 1911 in Białystok.

== History ==
Initially, the junior high school operated at Fabryczna Street (in a house belonging to the Trylling family). In 1913, it was moved to the Chwoles building at Pałacowa 3. It was closed after World War I. A school for Polish and Jewish children was opened in the junior high school building. Currently, there is the Podlaskie branch of NFZ.

The building of Zinaida Khvolesova Girls' High School is one of points of opened in June 2008. Jewish Heritage Trail in Białystok, developed by the group of doctoral student and students of UwB – volunteers of Foundation of the university in Białystok.

The object is entered to list of heritage registers at number A-364 of 26th January 1988.
