= Higher Medical School of Białystok =

- Wyższa Szkoła Medyczna w Białymstoku
- Type: Private
- Established: April 16, 2003
- Location: Krakowska 9, Białystok, Poland; 53.132694030°N 23.147450477°E
- Website: wsmed.edu.pl Building details
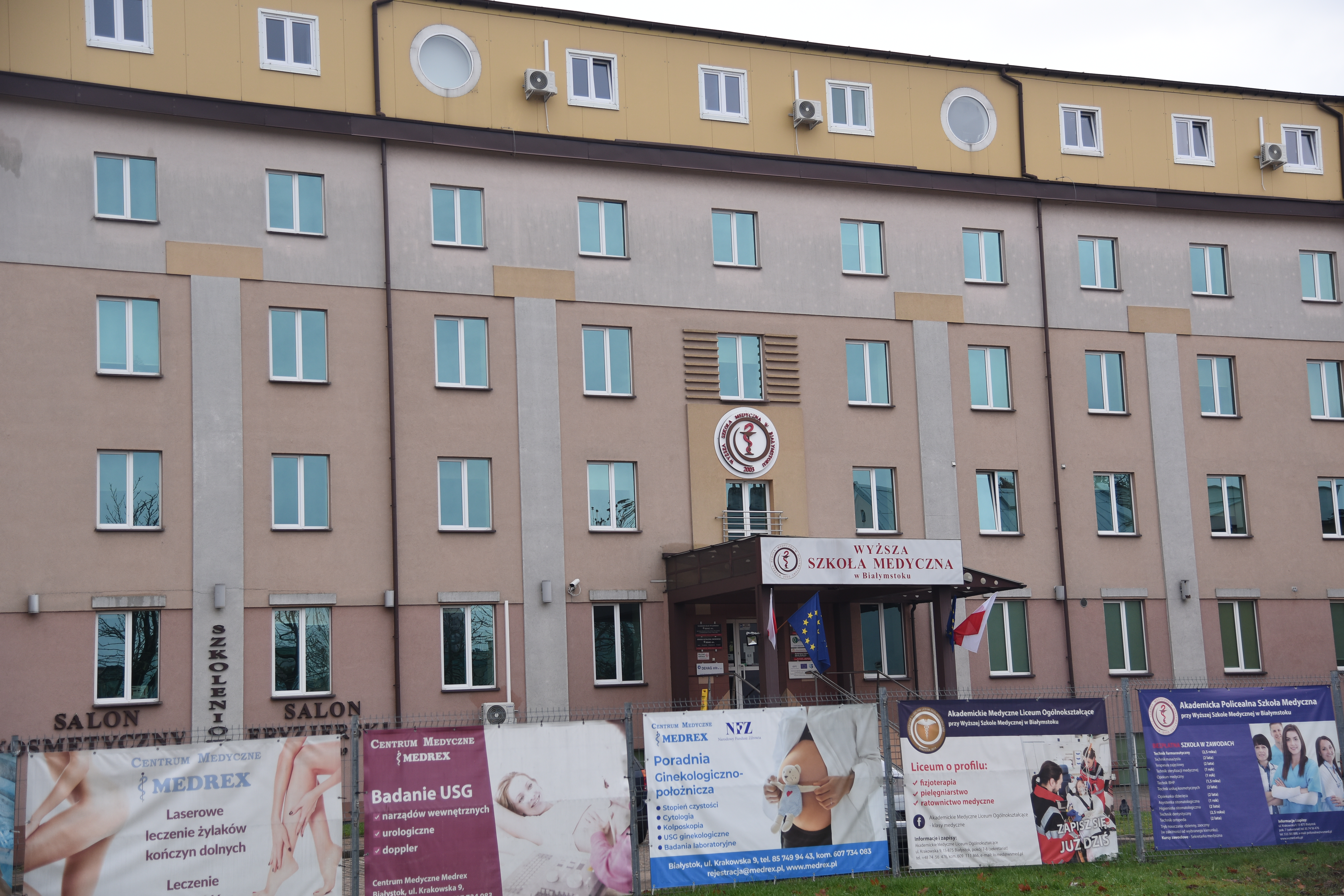

Higher Medical School of Białystok (Polish: Wyższa Szkoła Medyczna w Białymstoku) (until 2012 known as Białystok Institute of Cosmetology and Healthcare (Polish: Wyższa Szkoła Kosmetologii i Ochrony Zdrowia w Białymstoku) is a private trade school in Białystok, Poland. It offers a three-year course of study in the following specialities: cosmetology, nursing, public health (health and beauty promotion; paramedic studies) and physical therapy. Its graduates receive a bachelor certificate (Polish: licencjat). Its faculty includes members of the faculty of Białystok University, Białystok Technical University, and the Medical University of Białystok.

== History ==
Białystok Institute of Cosmetology was opened on April 16, 2003. After its curriculum was widened to include nursing and public health, its name was expanded to Białystok Institute of Cosmetology and Healthcare.

== School Authorities ==
- Rector: prof. dr hab. R. Czerpak
- Pro-Rector: dr inż. W. Puczyński

== Cosmetology curriculum ==
- Basic human anatomy
- Histology
- General chemistry
- Biophysics with physiotherapy
- Dietetics
- Sanitation and sterilization
- Types of cosmetics
- Hairstyling and cosmetic products
- Aesthetics
- Hairstyling and cosmetic techniques
- The outline of the history of cosmetology
- Professional cosmetology
- Basic psychology
- Foreign language (English or German)
- Basic human physiology
- General biochemistry
- General microbiology
- Medicine with elements of pathophysiology
- Dermatology
- Allergology with immunology
- Basic knowledge of medicines
- Cosmetic chemistry
- Chemistry of natural cosmetic ingredients
- Basic pedagogy
- Basic sociology
- Evaluation of cosmetics
- Aromatic substances
- Toxicology
- Electricity and machines
- Basic economy and finances
- Basic marketing and management
- Laws and regulations at work
- Basic commercial law
- Diploma seminar
- Diploma thesis
- IT
- Physical education
- Practical training
