= Academy of Economics in Białystok =

- Wyższa Szkoła Ekonomiczna w Białymstoku (WSE)
- Type: Private
- Established: 5 January 1996
- Students: 3,000
- Address: 15-732 Choroszczańska 31, Białystok, Poland; 53°08′09″N 23°07′47.8″E
- Website: wse.edu.pl Building details
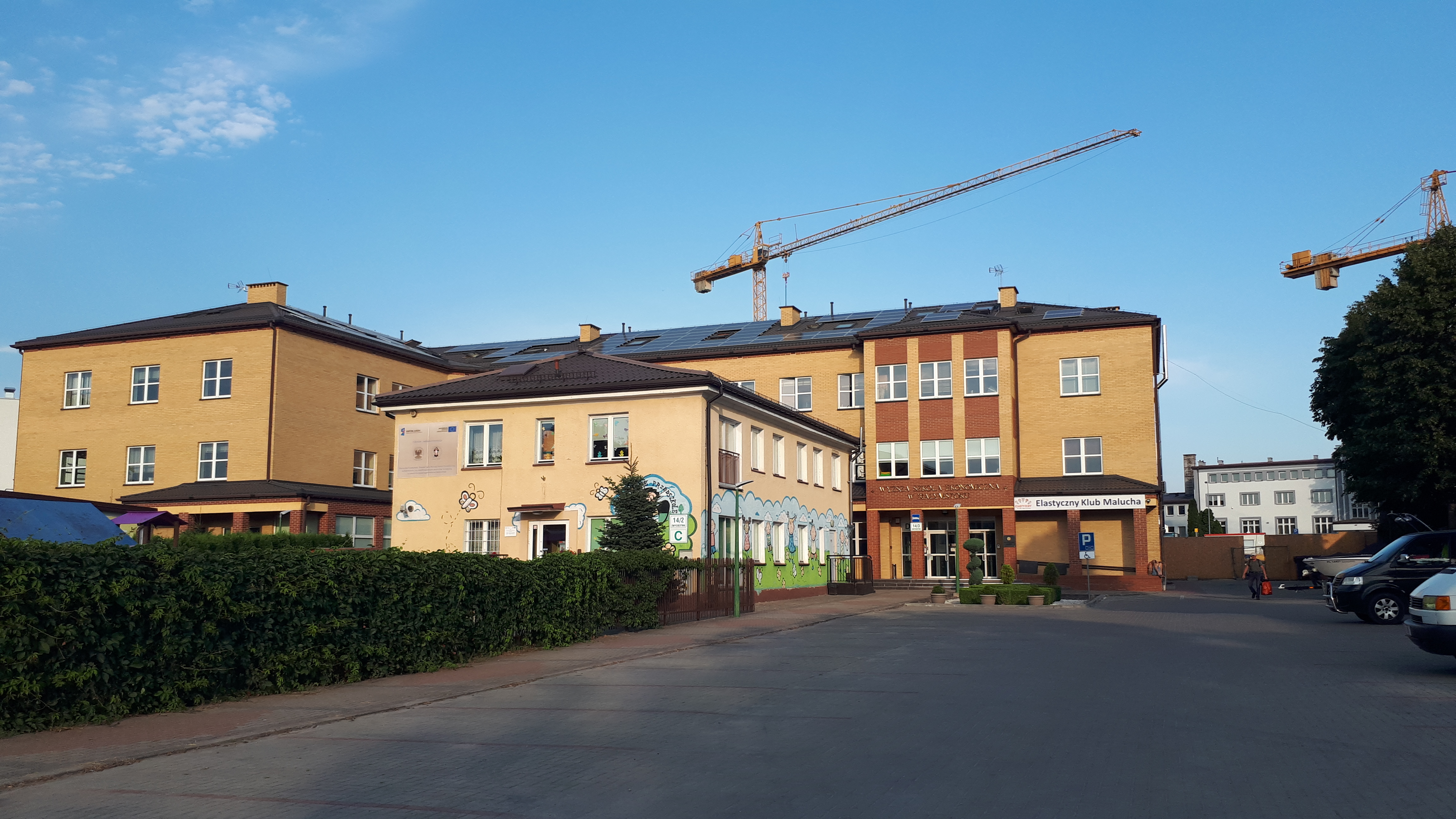

Academy of Economics in Białystok (Polish: Wyższa Szkoła Ekonomiczna w Białymstoku, WSE) was opened on January 5, 1996. It is a non-governmental collegiate-level institution of higher education in the city of Białystok (wyższa uczelnia), one of several such institutions including the largest University of Białystok locally. The academy was ranked in 2008 by the Polish edition of Newsweek as best in the Podlaskie Voivodeship. It offers bachelor's and master's degrees in three general fields of knowledge, as well as one-year postgraduate studies.

== Organizational structure ==
- Bachelor's and master's degree programmes
1. Economy (Ekonomii)
2. Work hygiene and safety (Bezpieczeństwa i Higieny Pracy)
3. International relations (Stosunków Międzynarodowych)
- Postgraduate studies
1. Finances and accounting (Finansów i Rachunkowości)
2. Statistical methods (Metod Ilościowych i Informatyki)
3. Politics of economy (Polityki Ekonomicznej, Społecznej i Regionalnej)
4. Management and marketing (Zarządzania, Marketingu i Prawa)
5. Economic development (Zrównoważonego Rozwoju i Gospodarki Opartej na Wiedzy)
6. Departments o Foreign languages & physical education (Studium Języków Obcych i Studium Wychowania Fizycznego)
