= 1991 Transnistrian independence referendum =

- 1 December 1991

Results
Choice	Votes	%
Yes	363,647	97.75%
No	8,380	2.25%
Valid votes	372,027	100.00%
Invalid or blank votes	0	0.00%
Total votes	372,027	100.00%
Registered voters/turnout		78.00%

A referendum was held in Transnistria on 1 December 1991, in which Transnistria voted to continue its de facto independence and seek international recognition as a separate, sovereign country and member of the international community.

97.7% of those who came to the polls opted for separation from Moldova.

In numbers, 372,027 people took part in the referendum. Of those, 363,647 people voted for independence of the Pridnestrovian Moldavian Republic.

International observers were invited, including representatives of the US State Department. However, only representatives of the St. Petersburg city council accepted the invitation to participate. In the conclusion of the observers, the referendum was an expression of the true will of Transnistria's population. The United States, which did not avail itself of the invitation to watch the referendum, later expressed doubt about its veracity. Transnistria offered to hold it again, and indeed did so with the 2006 Transnistrian referendum. According to an article by the ethnic Russian researcher from Moldova Alla Skvortsova from 2002, "polls and elections in the PMR may to some extent have been rigged".
