= Claudio Muccioli =

Sammarinese politician

Claudio Muccioli (born 8 April 1958) is a former captain-regent of San Marino. His term with Antonello Bacciocchi lasted from 1 October 2005 to 1 April 2006. He is a member of the San Marinese Christian Democratic Party.
