= Antonello Bacciocchi =

Sammarinese politician

Antonello Bacciocchi (born 2 November 1957) was a Sammarinese politician. He was one of the captains-regent of San Marino until his term with Claudio Muccioli expired on 1 April 2006. As is traditional in San Marino, the term started on 1 October 2005; he had previously served as a captain-regent from 1 April 1999 to 1 October 1999. Bacciocchi is a member of the San Marinese Socialist Party and Minister of Labour, Cooperation and Youth Policies.

His daughter is politician Ilaria Bacciocchi.
