= Białystok University of Technology =

Technical university in Poland

- Politechnika Białostocka
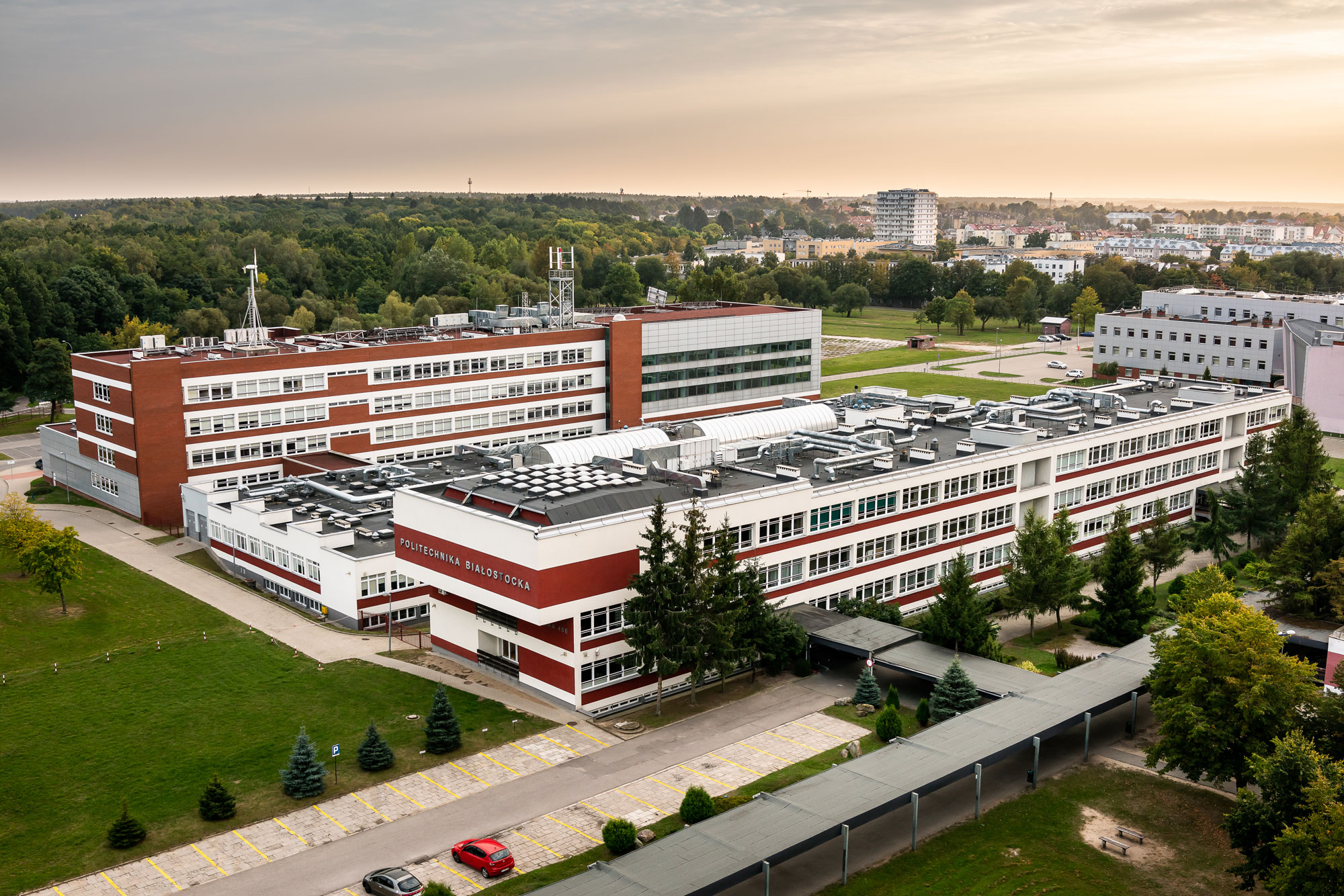
- View of the Białystok University of Technology
- Type: Public
- Established: December 1, 1949
- Affiliations: Magna Charta Universitarium 2020, IROs Forum, EUA, KRASP, KRPUT
- Rector: Prof. Marta Kosior-Kazberuk, PhD, Eng.
- Students: 6,810 (12.2023)
- Location: Białystok, Podlaskie Voivodeship, Poland; 53°07′00″N 23°08′46″E
- Website: pb.edu.pl

Białystok University of Technology (Polish: Politechnika Białostocka) is the largest technical university in northeast Poland.

The beginnings of Białystok University of Technology date back to 1949, when the Private Evening College of Engineering of the Polish Federation of Engineering Associations (FSNT-NOT) was established in Bialystok.

Today Białystok University of Technology employs more than 620 academic educators and provides graduate courses for more than 7,000 students at six faculties.

The study plans at the BUT are consulted with the biggest employers in the region, and the students complete their internships and work placements in partner firms as early as during their studies. A great majority of the BUT's graduates find jobs within the first year after graduation.

Białystok University of Technology cooperates with many academic centres all over the world and has over 500 active bilateral agreements in scientific and educational cooperation with foreign partners (more information IRO BUT).

Białystok University of Technology has continuously been developing its scientific and teaching infrastructure. The last years were an unprecedented investment period for Bialystok University of Technology. The university gained four new facilities: the Centre for Modern Education, the Research and Education Centre of the Faculty of Electrical Engineering, the INNO-EKO-TECH Innovative Research and Education Centre for Alternative Energy Sources, and Energy-efficient Construction and Environmental Protection.

The university campus is located almost at the heart of the town and has easy access to all especially in terms of advance technologies.

== History ==
In 1949, Białystok, far away from its former glory, is rising from its post-war ruins. The once delightful tenement houses have burnt to ashes. The town needs to be rebuilt. The needs are enormous, the deficiencies even greater. Not only has the war deprived Białystok of its buildings but – above all – of its people, including professionals and specialists. The need to educate local engineers to rebuild the town and its former industry gives rise to the Private Evening College of Engineering in Bialystok (Polish: Prywatna Wieczorowa Szkoła Inżynierska NOT w Białymstoku) – the present Bialystok University of Technology.

24 November 1949 - the Polish Ministry of Education issued a decision allowing for the establishment and running of the FSNT-NOT Private Evening College of Engineering in Bialystok by the Polish Federation of Engineering Associations.

1 December 1949 – FSNT-NOT Private Evening College of Engineering starts functioning. Karol Bialkowski, MSc, Eng, is appointed its first Rector. The First College emblem is designed.

1950 – Faculties of Mechanical, Electrical Engineering and Faculty of Civil Engineering start teaching activities.

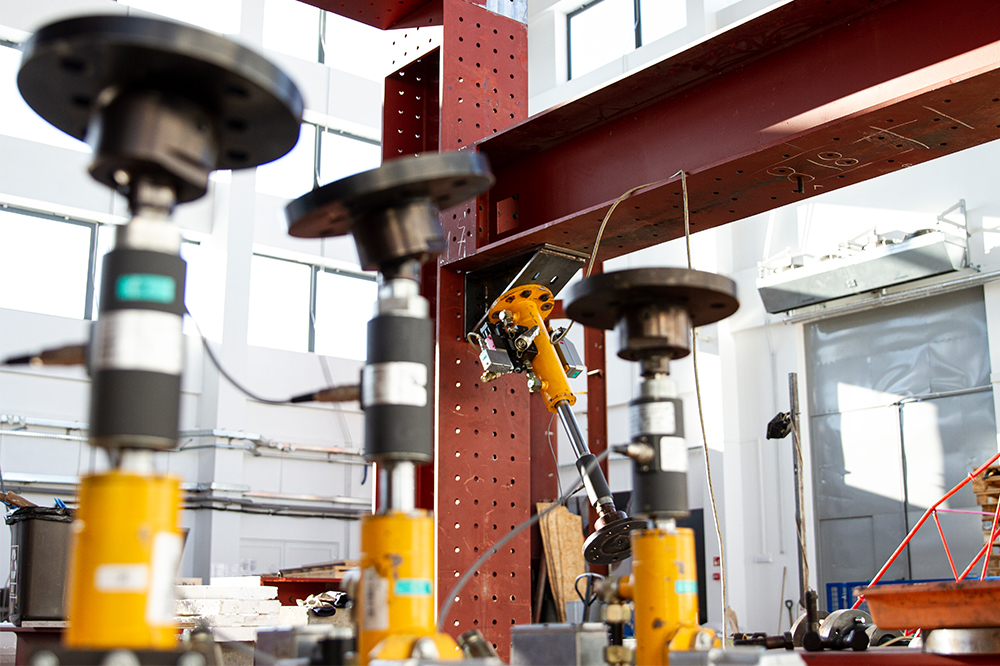
Laboratories at the Faculty of Civil Engineering at BUT

1951 – Provincial People's Council gives a building located in Biala St. to College which is nationalised and renamed Evening College of Engineering.

1953 – Provincial People's Council gives College building and hall in Grunwaldzka St.

1954 – First 28 electrical engineers and 29 mechanical engineers graduate from the Evening College of Engineering.

1964 - Machining Hall of Faculty of Mechanical Engineering is created in Grunwaldzka St. Centre for Foreign Language Teaching and Physical Education Centre are established.

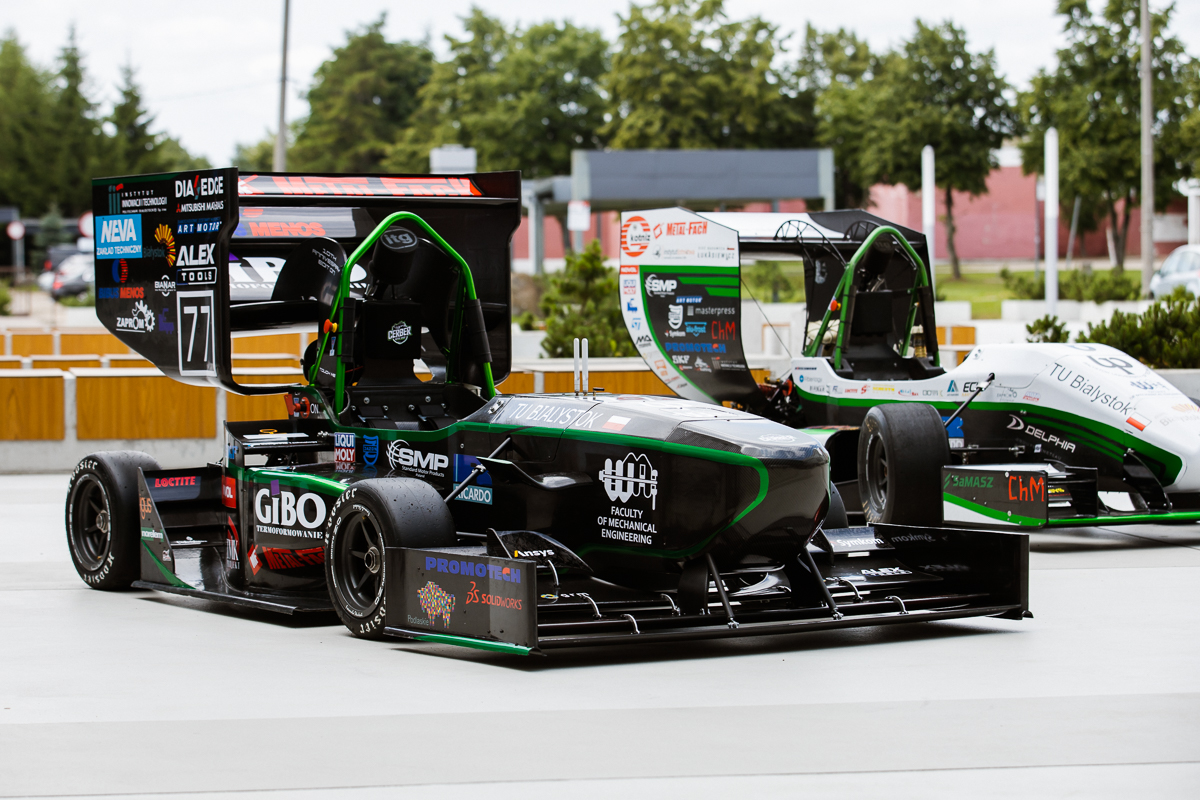
Bolid CMS 07 made by BUT students

1964 – Evening School of Engineering changes its name to Higher School of Engineering.

1966 - The first admission to full-time studies at the Faculty of Civil Engineering takes place.

1966 - Akadera Radio, first academic radio station, is founded.

1974 - Construction works of campus in the area of Zwierzyniecka, Wiejska, and Świerkowa Streets start.

19 September 1974 – Higher School of Engineering gains academic status and becomes Bialystok University of Technology.

1974 - Centre for Electronic Computation Technology (later Institute of Computer Science) is established.

1975 – Institute of Architecture with rights of Faculty is founded.

1980 - First unit of our University, Institute of Civil Engineering, is awarded right to confer PhD academic degree in technical sciences (in Environmental Engineering).

1984 - Department for Experimental Production and Technical Services at Bialystok University of Technology is founded.

1989 - Institute of Computer Science with rights of Faculty is created.

At the beginning of the 1990s, the demand for specialists (especially in IT, modern technology, and management and marketing) increased in the Polish labour market.

1993 – Department of Economic and Social Sciences is transformed into Institute of Management and Marketing (now Faculty of Management Engineering).

1994 - the Rectors of Bialystok universities signed an agreement on the construction of the BIAMAN Municipal Computer Network, the first Internet provider in Bialystok.

2001 - Faculty of Environmental Management in Hajnowka is created. Institute of Management and Marketing becomes Faculty of Management, and Institute of Computer Science – Faculty of Computer Science.

2002 - New seat of Faculty of Electrical Engineering is opened. Foundation for the Development of Bialystok University of Technology is established.

2009 - Children’ s University of Bialystok University of Technology is inaugurated.

2011 – Institute of Innovation and Technology of Bialystok University of Technology starts functioning.

2011 – Faculty of Environmental Management of Bialystok University of Technology in Hajnowka becomes Faculty of Forestry of Bialystok University of Technology in Hajnowka.

2011 – HD TV of Bialystok University of Technology starts broadcasting.

2012 – Centre for Modern Education of Bialystok University of Technology

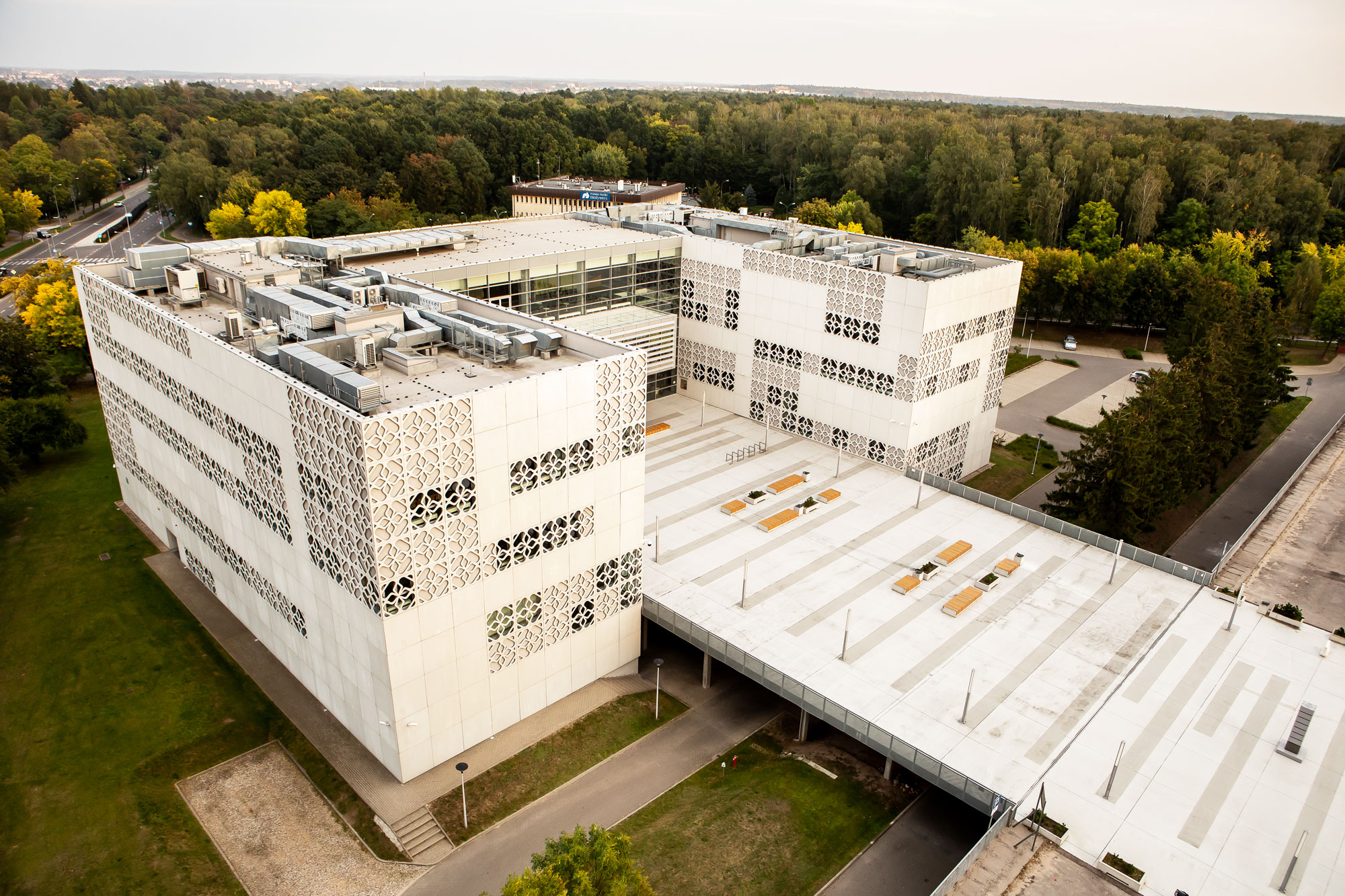
Center of Modern Education

2015 – Research and Education Centre of Faculty of Electrical Engineering is put into operation.

2015 – Innovative Research and Education Centre for Alternative Energy Sources, Energy-efficient Construction and Environmental Protection is opened.

2015 – Scientific and Research Centre of Faculty of Forestry in Hajnowka is inaugurated.

2016 – General Education Secondary School of Bialystok University of Technology is opened.

== University authorities ==
- University Authorities 2020-2024
  - Rector: Prof. Marta Kosior-Kazberuk, DSc, PhD, Eng.
    - Vice-Rector of Development: Prof. Mirosław Świercz, DSc, PhD, Eng.
    - Vice-Rector of Scientific Research: Prof. Marek Krętowski, DSc, PhD, Eng.
    - Vice-Rector of Education: Prof. Agnieszka Dardzińska-Głębocka, DSc, PhD.
    - Vice-Rector of International Cooperation: Prof. Dorota Anna Krawczyk, DSc, PhD, Eng.
    - Vice-Rector of Students' Affairs: Prof. Jarosław Szusta, DSc, PhD, Eng.
- University Authorities 2016-2020
  - Rector: Prof. Lech Dzienis, DSc, PhD, PE
  - Years 2016-2019:
    - Vice-Rector of Scientific Research: Prof. Andrzej Sikorski, DSc, PhD, Eng.
    - Vice-Rector of Students' Affairs: Prof. Jarosław Perszko, DSc, PhD
    - Vice-Rector of Development: Prof. Roman Kaczyński, PhD
    - Vice-Rector of Education and International Cooperation: Prof. Marta Kosior-Kazberuk, PhD, Eng.
  - Years 2019-2020
    - Vice-Rector of Scientific Research: Prof. Andrzej Sikorski, DSc, PhD, Eng.
    - Vice-Rector of Students' Affairs: Prof. Jarosław Perszko, DSc, PhD
    - Vice-Rector of Development: Prof. Joanna Ejdys, DSc, Eng.
    - Vice-Rector of International Cooperation: Prof. Marta Kosior-Kazberuk, DSc, PhD, Eng.
    - Vice-Rector of Education: Prof. Iwona Skoczko, DSc, Eng.

== Academic profile ==
Teaching and degrees

Bialystok University of Technology offers 1st degree (Bachelor's or Engineer's), 2nd degree (Master's) and 3rd degree (PhD) studies, postgraduate studies, as well as training and language courses.

Bialystok University of Technology has rights to award PhD degrees in technical sciences in 7 disciplines, PhD degrees in social sciences in 1 discipline and DSc degrees in technical sciences in 5 disciplines.

The university offers various forms of education in English: a double diploma programme, free-mover, student exchange under the Erasmus + programme and a full cycle of education in English, including some interdisciplinary courses.

== Staff ==
- Professors: 175
- Teachers (total): 622
- Total staff: 1 401

== Faculties ==
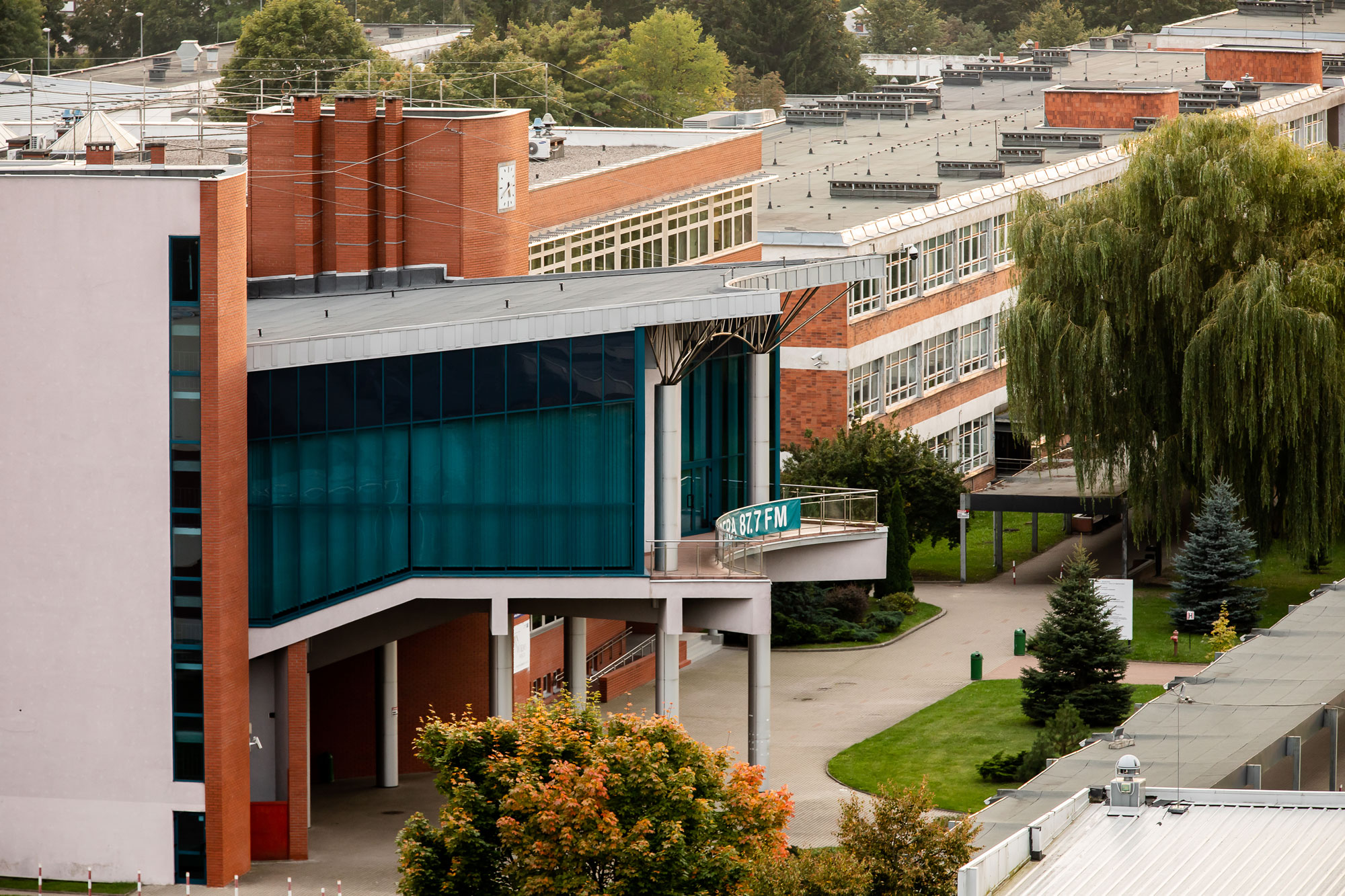

- Faculty of Architecture
  - Architecture - 1st degree, 2nd degree courses
  - Interior Design - 1st degree, 2nd degree courses
  - Graphic Arts - 1st degree course
- Faculty of Civil Engineering and Environmental Sciences
  - Landscape Architecture - 1st degree, 2nd degree courses
  - Civil Engineering - 1st degree, 2nd degree courses
  - Environmental Engineering - 1st degree, 2nd degree courses
  - Biotechnology - 1st degree, 2nd degree courses
  - Urban Planning - 1st degree, 2nd degree courses
  - Engineering in Thermal Energetics – 1st degree course
  - Agri-food Engineering – 1st degree course
  - Agri-food and Forestry Engineering – 2nd degree course
  - Forestry Engineering – 1st degree, 2nd degree courses
  - BIM – Building Information Modeling – 2nd degree course
- Faculty of Computer Science
  - Computer Science - 1st degree, 2nd degree courses
  - Applied Mathematics - 1st degree, 2nd degree courses
  - Computer science and Econometrics - 1st degree course
- Faculty of Electrical Engineering
  - Electronics and Telecommunications - 1st degree, 2nd degree courses
  - Electrotechnics - 1st degree, 2nd degree courses
  - Ecoenergetics - 1st degree courses
  - Electrotechnics – dual studies, 1st degree course
- Faculty of Engineering Management
  - Management - 1st degree, 2nd degree courses
  - Management and Production Engineering - 1st degree, 2nd degree courses
  - Management and Service Engineering - 1st degree course
  - Furniture Engineering - 1st degree course
  - Tourism And Recreation - 1st degree course
- Faculty of Mechanical Engineering
  - Automatic Control and Robotics - 1st degree, 2nd degree courses
  - Biomedical Engineering - 1st degree, 2nd degree courses
  - Mechatronics - 1st degree, 2nd degree courses
  - Mechanics and machine design - 1st degree, 2nd degree courses
  - Materials and manufacturing engineering - 1st degree course

PhD and DSC degrees of technical sciences (conducted in Polish or English):

- Architecture and Urban Planning - PhD
- Automation, Electronic and Electrical Engineering - PhD and DSc
- Information and Communication Technology - PhD and Dsc
- Biomedical Engineering - PhD
- Civil Engineering and Transport - PhD and DSc
- Mechanical Engineering - PhD, DSc
- Environmental Engineering, Mining and Energy - PhD and DSc

PhD degrees of social sciences (conducted in Polish or English):

- Management and Quality Studies - PhD

First and Second degree courses conducted in English:

- Architecture - 2nd degree course
- Interior Design - 2nd degree course
- Civil Engineering - 1st and 2nd degree courses
- Environmental Engineering - 1st and 2nd degree courses
- Electronics and Telecommunications - 2nd degree course
- Automatic Control and Robotics - 1st and 2nd degree course
- Logistics - 2nd degree course
- Management: Smart and Innovative Business - 2nd degree course
- Mechatronics - 1st and 2nd degree courses

== Institutions and facilities ==
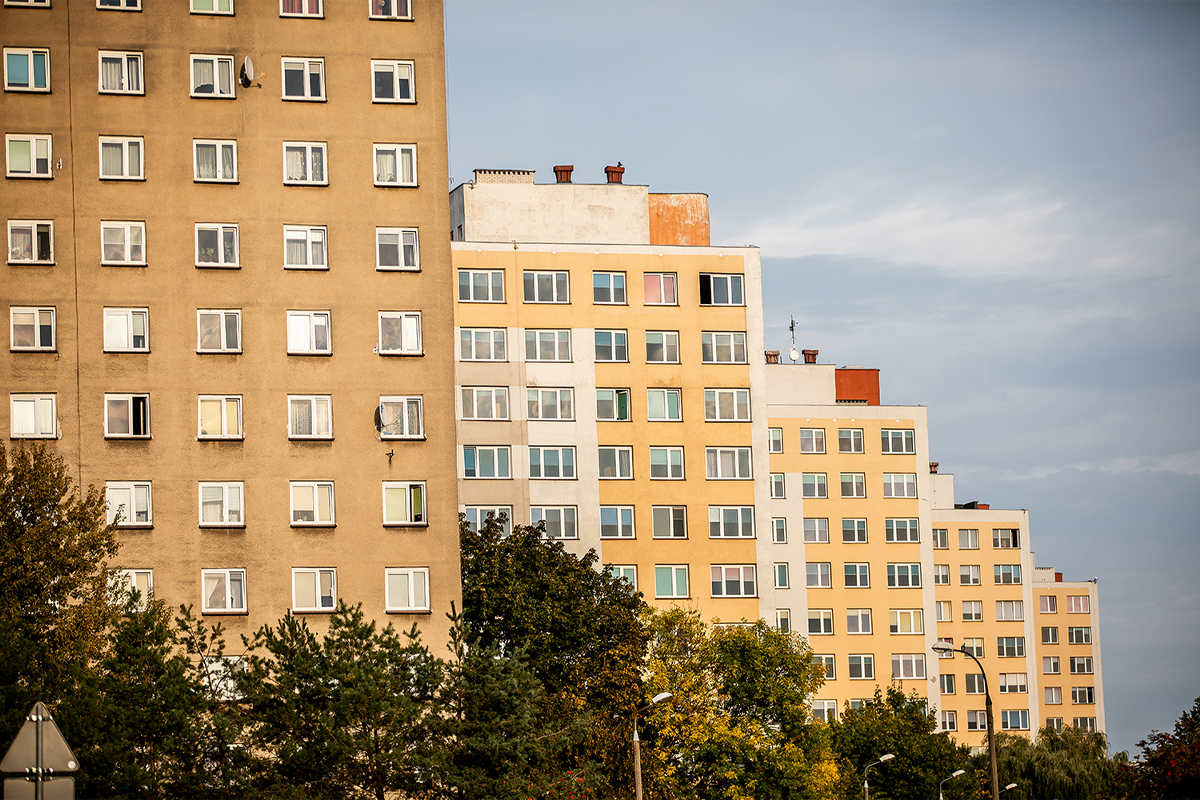
Dormitories at BUT

- Foreign Language Centre
- Centre for Modern Education
- Academic Sport Centre
- Doctoral School of the Bialystok University of Technology
- General Education Secondary School of Bialystok University of Technology
- Research and Education Centre of the Faculty of Electrical Engineering
- INNO-EKO-TECH Innovative Research and Education Centre for Alternative Energy Sources
- Energy-efficient Construction and Environmental Protection, and the Scientific and Research
- Scientific and Research Centre of Faculty of Forestry in Hajnowka
- Diamond Discoverers’ Association
- Foundation for the Development of Bialystok University of Technology
- Children’ s University of Bialystok University of Technology
- Institute of Innovation and Technology of Bialystok University of Technology
- Confucius Classroom, Centre for Polish-Chinese Cooperation
- BIAMAN Municipal Computer Network
- Akadera Radio Station 87.7 FM
- PLATON HD TV of Bialystok University of Technology
- GWINT Club
- Halls of Residence at the campus of Bialystok University of Technology
