= Charter for European Security =

1999 International agreement in Europe

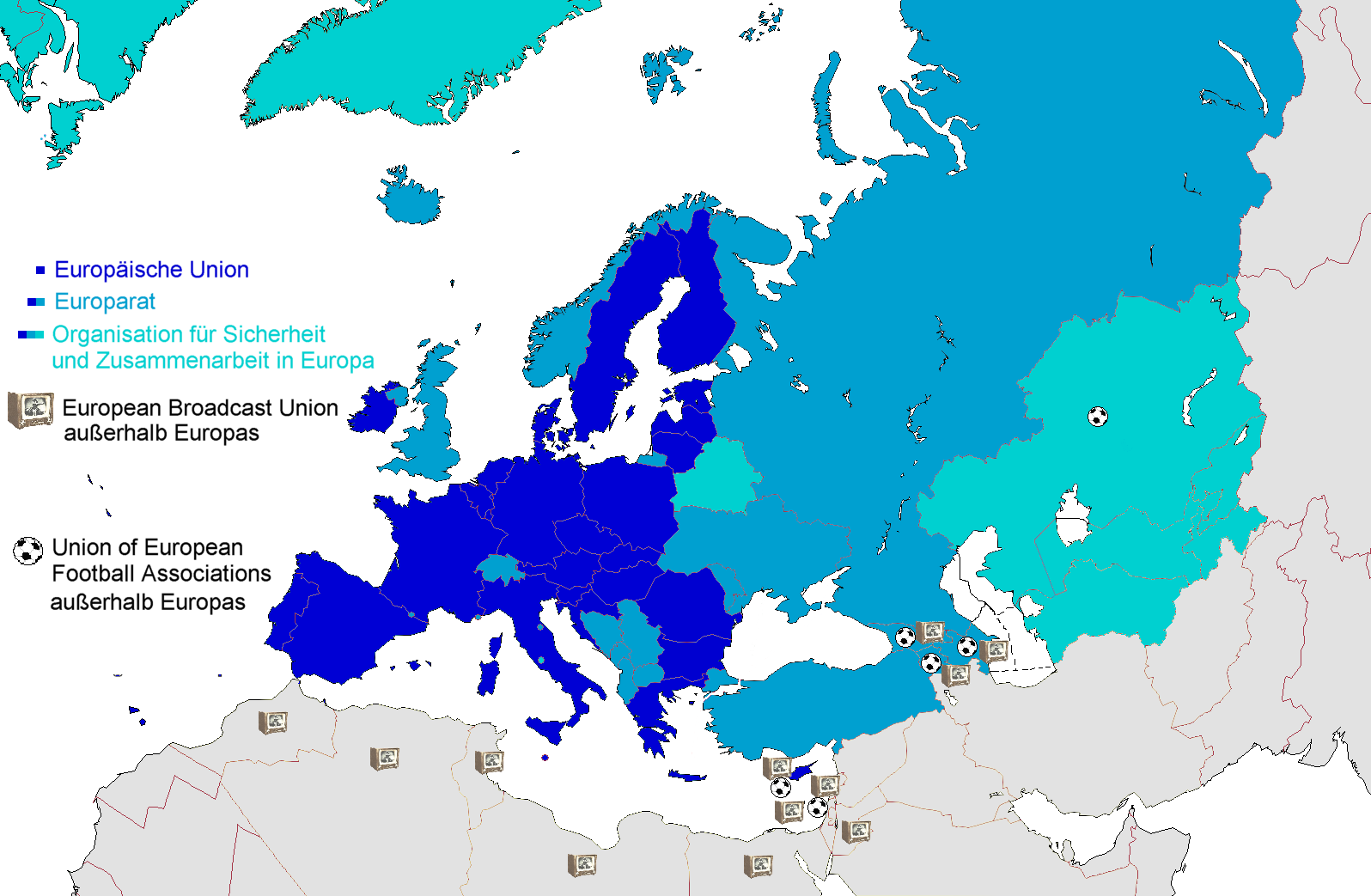
European OSCE States

The Charter for European Security is an international agreement for the preservation and safeguarding of peaceful order in Europe. It was adopted on 19 November 1999 in Istanbul as the final document of the OSCE Summit Conference by 55 European, Asian and American states. Together with the Helsinki Final Act (1975), the Charter of Paris (1990) and the subsequent Astana Summit Declaration (2010), the Charter for European Security forms the basis for a system of political commitments and a comprehensive concept of security. The concept of security encompasses politico-military aspects, economic and environmental aspects and humanitarian aspects. Following the adoption of the Charter for European Security at the OSCE Summit in Istanbul in November, the ‘Platform for Co-operative Security’ was created to strengthen co-operation between the OSCE and other international organisations/institutions in order to make better use of the resources of the international community.

== History ==
The Organisation for Security and Co-operation in Europe (OSCE) is a permanent conference of states for peacekeeping. It emerged from the Conference on Security and Cooperation in Europe (CSCE) on 1 January 1995.

At the end of the 1990s, the Organisation for Security and Cooperation in Europe (OSCE) played a central role in the further development of pan-European security, which met the needs of the democracies in Europe as well as the successor states of the Soviet Union.

The European Security Charter of 1999 represents a continuation and extension of the regulations agreed in the previous documents. These are also reaffirmed or clarified. Almost ten years after the end of the East-West conflict, a binding basis for the peaceful coexistence of the peoples of Europe was to be laid down in writing.

== Preamble to the Charter ==
On the threshold of the twenty-first century, we, the Heads of State or Government of the OSCE participating States, declare our firm commitment to a free, democratic and more integrated OSCE area, where peace prevails among the participating States and every individual and community lives in freedom, prosperity and security. In order to realise this commitment, we have decided to take a number of new steps. We have agreed to,

- Adopt the Platform for Co-operative Security to strengthen co-operation between the OSCE and other international organisations and institutions in order to make better use of the resources of the international community;
- expand the OSCE's role in peacekeeping, thereby making the organisation's comprehensive concept of security clearer;
- create Rapid Expert Assistance and Co-operation Teams (REACT) to enable the OSCE to respond rapidly to requests for assistance and for the deployment of large-scale civilian field operations;
- strengthen our capacity to fulfil policing tasks in order to help uphold the rule of law;
- Establish an operations centre from which OSCE field operations are planned and deployed;
- strengthen the consultation process within the OSCE through the creation of the Preparatory Committee under the auspices of the OSCE Permanent Council.

We are determined to prevent the outbreak of violent conflict wherever possible. The measures we have agreed to take in this Charter will strengthen both the OSCE's capacity in this regard and its ability to resolve conflicts and restore normality to societies devastated by war and destruction. The Charter will contribute to the creation of a common and indivisible security space. It will help to create an OSCE area without dividing lines and zones with different levels of security.

— OSZE, European Security Charter, Istanbul 1999,

== Content of the Charter ==
The Charter is divided into the ‘sections’ I. OUR COMMON CHALLENGES, II. OUR COMMON FUNDAMENT, III. OUR COMMON RESPONSE, IV. OUR COMMON INSTRUMENTS, V. OUR COOPERATION PARTNERS and VI. CONCLUSION, which in turn contain subsections. The individual paragraphs of the document are numbered consecutively from 1 to 52 for orientation. The text of the Charter is supplemented by the ‘Decision Document - The Platform for Co-operative Security’.

I. OUR COMMON CHALLENGES

The Charter defines common challenges as the risk of conflicts between states (No. 2), the creation of trust between people within states and the deepening of cooperation between states (No. 3), the security risks arising from international terrorism (No. 4), violent extremism, organised crime and drug trafficking (No. 5), the consequences of acute economic problems and the damage to the environment for security (No. 5). 4), violent extremism, organised crime and drug trafficking (No. 5), the impact of acute economic problems and environmental degradation on security (No. 5) and security in nearby areas, particularly in the Mediterranean region and in areas in close proximity to participating States such as those in Central Asia (No. 6).

II. OUR COMMON FOUNDATION

As a common foundation, the signatory States reaffirm their full commitment to the Charter of the United Nations, the Helsinki Final Act, the Charter of Paris and all other OSCE documents to which they have agreed. They declare that all OSCE commitments apply equally and without exception to each participating State. They further reaffirm that the OSCE is a regional arrangement within the meaning of Chapter VIII of the Charter of the United Nations and one of the principal organisations for the peaceful settlement of disputes within their region, as well as a principal instrument for early warning, conflict prevention, crisis management and post-conflict rehabilitation. The OSCE is the comprehensive organisation for consultation, decision-making and co-operation in its region (No. 7). They explicitly emphasise that every participating State has the same right to security. They reaffirm the inherent right of each participating State to freely choose its security arrangements, including treaties of alliance, or to modify them in the course of their development. Each State also has the right to neutrality. Each participating State shall respect the rights of all others in this regard. No participating State will strengthen its security at the expense of the security of other States. Within the OSCE, no State, group of States or organisation has more responsibility for the maintenance of peace and stability in the OSCE area than others, nor can any of them consider any part of the OSCE area as its sphere of influence. (lfd. No. 8). States reaffirm their rights and obligations under the Charter of the United Nations, including their commitment on the issue of non-use of force or threat of force.

III. OUR JOINT RESPONSE

States commit themselves to (even closer) cooperation between international organisations in order to make the best possible use of the resources of the international community. States undertake to further strengthen and deepen cooperation with relevant organisations on the basis of equality and in a spirit of partnership through the Platform for Co-operative Security, which is adopted as an essential element of the Charter (para. 12).

Solidarity and partnership are emphasised in the Charter: ‘The best guarantee of peace and security in our region is the willingness and ability of each participating State to uphold democracy and the rule of law and to respect human rights. We each reaffirm our readiness to fully honour our commitments... We will, in a spirit of solidarity and partnership, work together to ensure the ongoing review of implementation’ (lfd. No. 14).

The Charter defines the following common institutions: the Parliamentary Assembly, the Office for Democratic Institutions and Human Rights (ODIHR), the High Commissioner on National Minorities (HCNM) and the Representative on Freedom of the Media and the OSCE Secretariat with the Chairperson-in-Office. These institutions are seen as essential instruments for guaranteeing respect for human rights, democracy and the rule of law (No. 18).

Under the humanitarian dimension of the Charter, States reaffirm that respect for human rights and fundamental freedoms, democracy and the rule of law are the cornerstones of the OSCE's comprehensive concept of security. They commit themselves to resolutely oppose threats to security such as violations of human rights and fundamental freedoms, including freedom of thought, conscience, religion and belief, and expressions of intolerance, aggressive nationalism, racism, chauvinism, xenophobia and anti-Semitism (No. 19). The signatories strictly reject any policy of ethnic cleansing or mass expulsion. They reaffirm their commitment to respect the right to seek asylum and to guarantee the protection of refugees under international law in accordance with the 1951 Convention relating to the Status of Refugees and its 1967 Protocol and to facilitate the voluntary return of refugees and internally displaced persons in dignity and safety (No. 22).

The States reaffirm their commitment to hold free and fair elections in accordance with OSCE commitments, in particular the Copenhagen Document 1990 (No. 25), and reaffirm the importance of independent media and the free flow of information and public access to information. They undertake to take all necessary steps to create the basic conditions for a free and independent media and for the unimpeded flow of information across national borders and within States, which are considered essential components of a democratic, free and open society (No. 26).

As part of the politico-military dimension of the Charter, the signatories recognise that the Treaty on Conventional Armed Forces in Europe (CFE) must remain a cornerstone of European security (No. 29).

== Literature ==
- Hans-Georg Ehrhart, Die EU und die OSZE, in: Yearbook of European Integration 2005, p. 461 ff., ISBN 978-3-8329-1751-7.
- Bernard von Plate, Eine europäische Sicherheitsarchitektur für das 21. Jahrhundert, in: IFSH (publ.), OSZE yearbook 1998, p. 319–334, ISBN 3-7890-5665-0.
- Hans-Georg Ehrhart, Ursel Schlichting: Europa von A bis Z., 14th edition 2016, ISBN 978-3-8487-2654-7.
