= Jacques Dupont =

Jacques Dupont may refer to:

- Jacques Dupont (cyclist) (1928–2019), French racing cyclist
- Jacques Dupont (director) (1921–2013), French film director
- Jacques Dupont (politician) (1929–2002), minister of state for Monaco
