= Paul Demange =

Paul Demange may refer to:

- Paul Demange (politician) (1906–1970), French politician
- Paul Demange (actor) (1901–1983), French actor
