= Helsinki Accords =

1975 non-binding European and North American political agreement

Helsinki Final Act Conference on Security and Co-operation in Europe Final Act
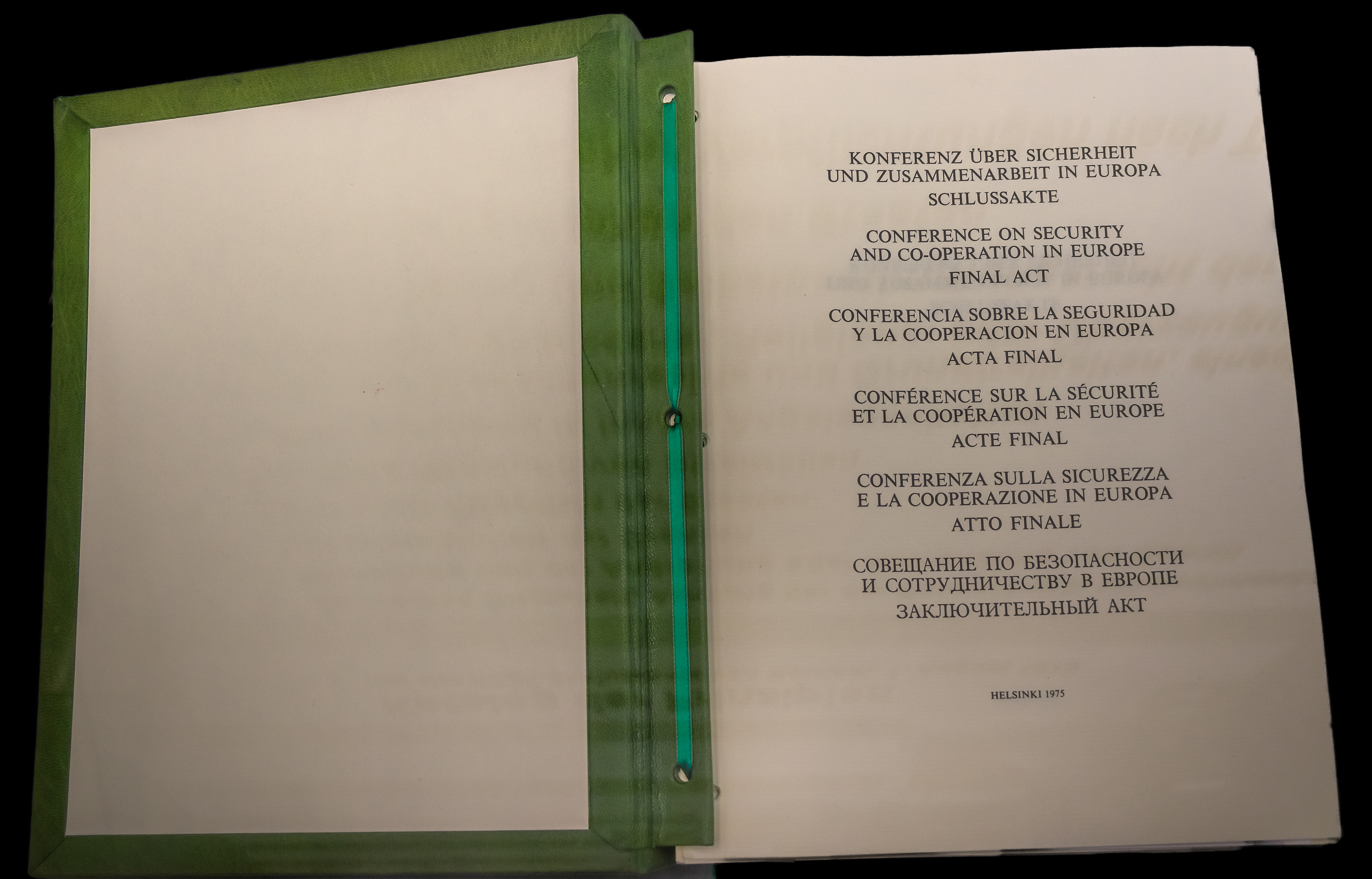
- The front page of the Helsinki Accords
- Host country: Finland
- Date: 30 July – 1 August 1975
- Cities: Helsinki
- Venues: Finlandia Hall
- Participants: Helmut Schmidt; Erich Honecker; Gerald Ford; Bruno Kreisky; Leo Tindemans; Todor Zhivkov; Pierre Trudeau; Makarios III; Anker Jørgensen; Carlos Arias Navarro; Urho Kekkonen; Valéry Giscard d’Estaing; Harold Wilson; Konstantinos Karamanlis; János Kádár; Liam Cosgrave; Geir Hallgrímsson; Aldo Moro; Walter Kieber; Gaston Thorn; Dom Mintoff; André Saint-Mleux; Trygve Bratteli; Joop den Uyl; Edward Gierek; Francisco da Costa Gomes; Nicolae Ceaușescu; Gian Luigi Berti; Agostino Casaroli; Olof Palme; Pierre Graber; Gustáv Husák; Süleyman Demirel; Leonid Brezhnev; Josip Broz Tito
- Precedes: Paris Charter

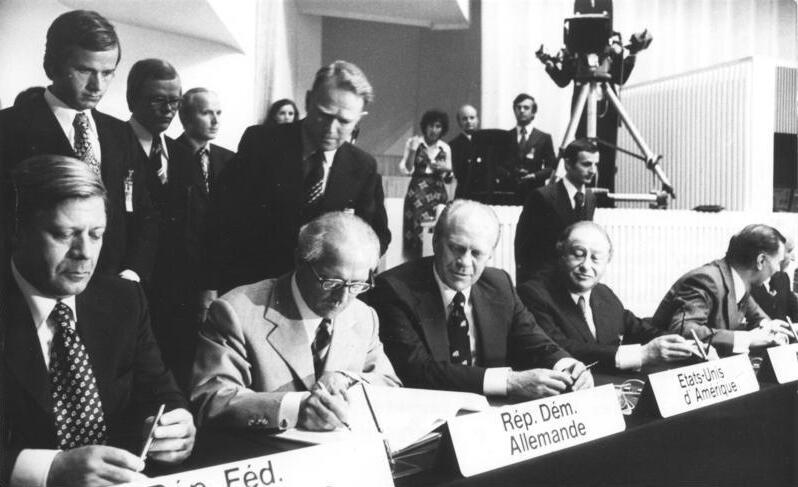
Chancellor of Federal Republic of Germany (West Germany) Helmut Schmidt, Chairman of the State Council of the German Democratic Republic (East Germany) Erich Honecker, US president Gerald Ford and Austrian chancellor Bruno Kreisky

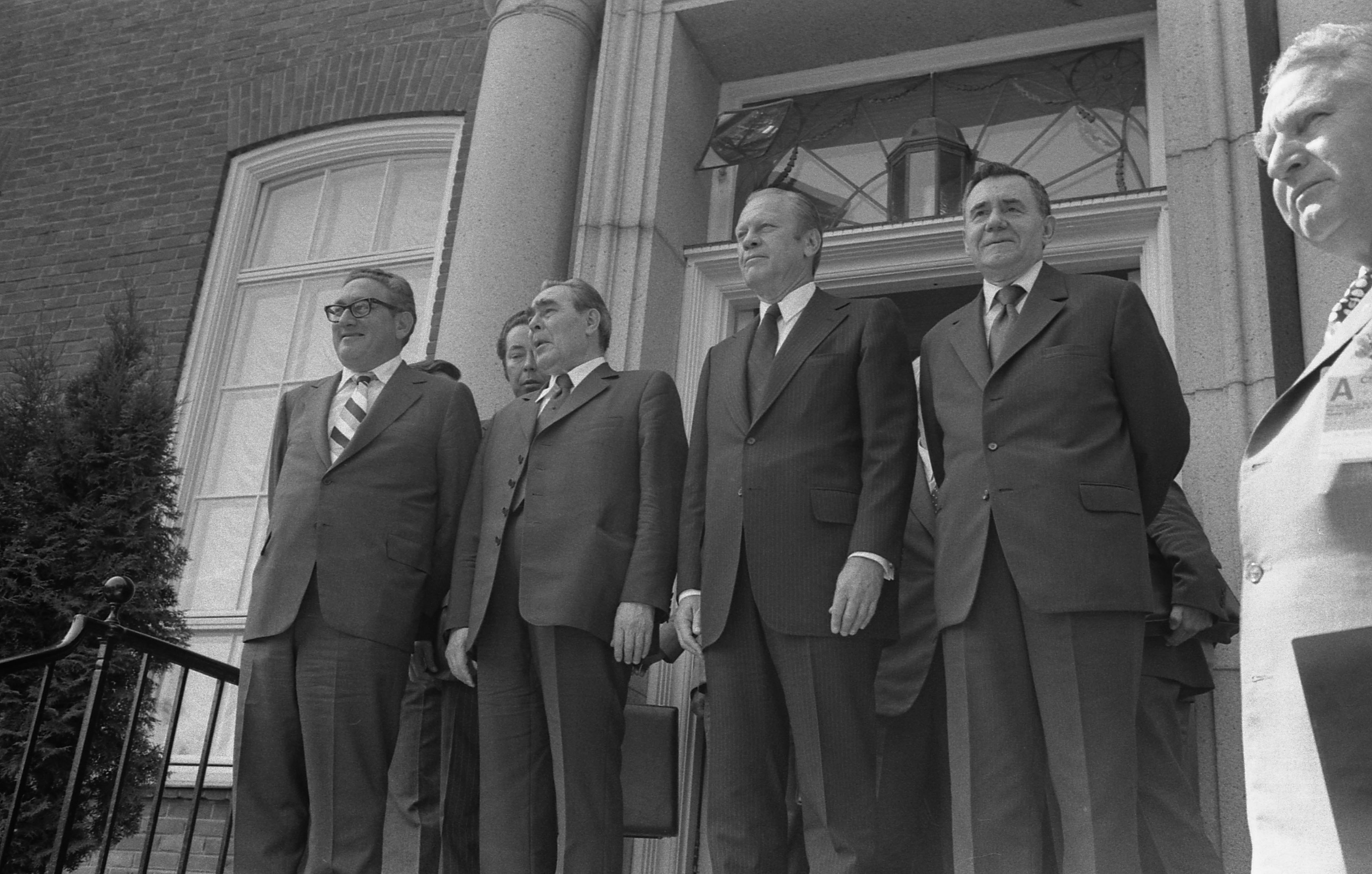
From left is Kissinger, Brezhnev, Ford, and Gromyko outside of the American Embassy, Helsinki, Finland, 1975.

The Helsinki Final Act, also known as Helsinki Accords or Helsinki Declaration, was the document signed at the closing meeting of the third phase of the Conference on Security and Co-operation in Europe (CSCE) held in Helsinki, Finland, between 30 July and 1 August 1975, following two years of negotiations known as the Helsinki Process. All then-existing European countries except Andorra and Hoxhaist Albania, as well as the United States and Canada (altogether 35 participating states), signed the Final Act in an attempt to improve the détente between the East and the West. The Helsinki Accords, however, were not binding as they did not have treaty status that would have to be ratified by parliaments. Sometimes the term "Helsinki pact(s)" was also used unofficially.

== Articles ==
In the Conference on Security and Co-operation in Europe terminology, there were four groupings or baskets. In the first basket, the "Declaration on Principles Guiding Relations between Participating States" (also known as "The Decalogue") enumerated the following 10 points:

1. Sovereign equality, respect for the rights inherent in sovereignty
2. Refraining from the threat or use of force
3. Inviolability of frontiers
4. Territorial integrity of states
5. Peaceful settlement of disputes
6. Non-intervention in internal affairs
7. Respect for human rights and fundamental freedoms, including the freedom of thought, conscience, religion or belief
8. Equal rights and self-determination of peoples
9. Co-operation among States
10. Fulfillment in good faith of obligations under international law

The second basket promised economic, scientific, and technological cooperation; facilitating business contacts and industrial cooperation; linking together transportation networks; and increasing the flow of information. The third basket involved commitments to improve the human context of family reunions, marriages and travel. It also sought to improve the conditions of journalists and expand cultural exchanges. The fourth basket dealt with procedures to monitor implementation, and to plan future meetings.

=== Freedom of information ===
The United States had sought a provision that would prohibit radio jamming but it failed to find consensus due to Soviet opposition. Despite this, the West believed jamming was illegal under the agreed upon language for "expansion of the dissemination of information broadcast by radio". The Soviet Union believed that jamming was a legally justified response to broadcasts they argued were a violation of the Helsinki Accords' broad purpose to "meet the interest of mutual understanding among people and the aims set forth by the Conference".

== Ford administration ==
When President Gerald Ford came into office in August 1974, the Conference on Security and Co-operation in Europe (CSCE) negotiations had been underway for nearly two years. Although the USSR was looking for a rapid resolution, none of the parties were quick to make concessions, particularly on human rights points. Throughout much of the negotiations, US leaders were disengaged and uninterested with the process. In August 1974, National Security Advisor and Secretary of State Henry Kissinger said to Ford "we never wanted it but we went along with the Europeans [...] It is meaningless – it is just a grandstand play to the left. We are going along with it."

In the months leading up to the conclusion of negotiations and signing of the Helsinki Final Act, the American public, in particular Americans of Eastern European descent voiced their concerns that the agreement would mean the acceptance of Soviet domination over Eastern Europe and forced incorporation of the Baltic States into the USSR. President Ford was concerned about this as well and sought clarification on this issue from the US National Security Council.

The US Senate was also worried about the fate of the Baltic States and the CSCE in general. Several senators wrote to President Ford requesting that the final summit stage be delayed until all matters had been settled, and in a way favorable to the West. Ford also attracted criticism from a wide range of political spectrum when he refused to meet with Soviet dissident Aleksandr Solzhenitsyn to avoid damaging Soviet Union–United States relations before the conference.

Shortly before President Ford departed for Helsinki, he held a meeting with a group of Americans of Eastern European background, and stated definitively that US policy on the Baltic States would not change, but would be strengthened since the agreement denies the annexation of territory in violation of international law and allows for the peaceful change of borders.

Ford in July 1975 told the delegation of Americans from East European backgrounds that:

The Helsinki documents involve political and moral commitments aimed at lessening tensions and opening further the lines of communication between the peoples of East and West. ... We are not committing ourselves to anything beyond what we are already committed to by our own moral and legal standards and by more formal treaty agreements such as the United Nations Charter and Declaration of Human Rights. ... If it all fails, Europe will be no worse off than it is now. If even a part of it succeeds, the lot of the people in Eastern Europe will be that much better, and the cause of freedom will advance at least that far.

His reassurances had little effect. The volume of negative mail continued to grow. The American public was still unconvinced that American policy on the incorporation of the Baltic States would not be changed by the Helsinki Final Act. Despite protests from all around, Ford decided to move forward and sign the agreement. As domestic criticism mounted, Ford hedged on his support for the Helsinki Accords, which had the impact of overall weakening his foreign-policy stature.

Ronald Reagan made the Accords a centerpiece of his campaign against Ford for the 1976 Republican Party presidential primaries. During the general election, the Democratic nominee Jimmy Carter attacked the Accords as a legitimation of the "Soviet domination of Eastern Europe"; later in the campaign, he said they "might have been a good agreement at the beginning", but that the Ford administration had "failed to enforce" them, particularly the Basket Three obligations on free movement of people.

In this context, a question about the Accords during the second presidential debate on October 6 led to an infamous presidential gaffe in which Ford claimed that there was "no Soviet domination of Eastern Europe, and there never will be under a Ford administration" and went on to deny that Romanians or Poles felt "dominated by the Soviet Union". This debate blunder, together with Ford's persistence with similar remarks when repeatedly asked to explain his answer over the following week, proved disastrous.

== Reception and impact ==
The document was seen both as a significant step toward reducing Cold War tensions and as a major diplomatic boost for the Soviet Union at the time, due to its clauses on the inviolability of national frontiers and respect for territorial integrity, which were seen to consolidate the USSR's territorial gains in Central Europe following World War II. Considering objections from Canada, Spain, Ireland and other states, the Final Act simply stated that "frontiers" in Europe should be stable but could change by peaceful internal means. US president Gerald Ford also reaffirmed that US non-recognition policy of the Baltic States' (Lithuania, Latvia and Estonia) forced incorporation into the Soviet Union had not changed. Leaders of other NATO member states made similar statements.

However, the civil rights portion of the agreement provided the basis for the work of the Helsinki Watch, an independent non-governmental organization created to monitor compliance to the Helsinki Accords (which evolved into several regional committees, eventually forming the International Helsinki Federation and Human Rights Watch). While these provisions applied to all signatories, the focus of attention was on their application to the Soviet Union and its Warsaw Pact allies, including Bulgaria, Czechoslovakia, the German Democratic Republic (East Germany), Hungary, Poland, and Romania. Soviet propaganda presented the Final Act as a great triumph for Soviet diplomacy and for Brezhnev personally.

In practice, the Soviet government significantly curbed the rule of law, civil liberties, protection of law and guarantees of property, which were considered examples of "bourgeois morality" by Soviet legal theorists such as Andrey Vyshinsky. The Soviet Union signed legally-binding human rights documents, but they were neither widely known or accessible to people living under Communist rule, nor were they taken seriously by the Communist authorities. Human rights activists in the Soviet Union were regularly subjected to harassment, repressions and arrests.

According to the Cold War scholar John Lewis Gaddis in his book The Cold War: A New History (2005), "Leonid Brezhnev had looked forward, Anatoly Dobrynin recalls, to the 'publicity he would gain… when the Soviet public learned of the final settlement of the postwar boundaries for which they had sacrificed so much'… '[Instead, the Helsinki Accords] gradually became a manifesto of the dissident and liberal movement'… What this meant was that the people who lived under these [communist] systems – at least the more courageous – could claim official permission to say what they thought."

The then-People's Republic of Albania refused to participate in the Accords, its leader Enver Hoxha arguing:

All the satellites of the Soviets with the possible exception of the Bulgarians want to break the shackles of the Warsaw Treaty, but they cannot. Then their only hope is that which the Helsinki document allows them, that is, to strengthen their friendship with the United States of America and the West, to seek investments from them in the form of credits and imports of their technology without any restrictions, to allow the church to occupy its former place, to deepen the moral degeneration, to increase the anti-Sovietism, and the Warsaw Treaty will remain an empty egg-shell.

The Helsinki Accords served as the groundwork for the later Organization for Security and Cooperation in Europe (OSCE), established in 1995 under the Paris Charter of 1990.

== Signatory states ==

- Austria
- Belgium
- Bulgaria
- Canada
- Cyprus
- Czechoslovakia
- Denmark
- Finland
- France
- East Germany
- West Germany
- Greece
- Holy See
- Hungary
- Iceland
- Ireland
- Italy
- Liechtenstein
- Luxembourg
- Malta
- Monaco
- Netherlands
- Norway
- Poland
- Portugal
- Romania
- San Marino
- Soviet Union
- Spain
- Sweden
- Switzerland
- Turkey
- United Kingdom
- United States
- Yugoslavia

== Heads of state or government ==
The "undersigned High Representatives of the participating States" as well as seating at the conference were ordered alphabetically by the countries' short names in French (thus starting with the two Allemagnes followed by Amérique, and Tchécoslovaquie separated from Union soviétique by Turquie etc.). This also influenced the act's headers consecutively in German, English, Spanish, French, Italian and Russian, which were also the conference's working languages and languages of the act itself.

- Helmut Schmidt, Chancellor of the Federal Republic of Germany
- Erich Honecker, First Secretary of the Central Committee of the Socialist Unity Party of Germany
- Gerald Ford, President of the United States
- Bruno Kreisky, Chancellor of Austria
- Leo Tindemans, Prime Minister of Belgium
- Todor Zhivkov, Chairman of the State Council of Bulgaria
- Pierre Trudeau, Prime Minister of Canada
- Makarios III, President of Cyprus
- Anker Jørgensen, Prime Minister of Denmark
- Carlos Arias Navarro, Prime Minister of Spain
- Urho Kekkonen, President of Finland
- Valéry Giscard d’Estaing, President of France (who also serves as Co-Prince of Andorra however no such function at all is mentioned in the declaration)
- Harold Wilson, Prime Minister of the United Kingdom
- Konstantinos Karamanlis, Prime Minister of Greece
- János Kádár, First Secretary of the Central Committee of the Hungarian Socialist Workers' Party
- Liam Cosgrave, Taoiseach of Ireland
- Geir Hallgrímsson, Prime Minister of Iceland
- Aldo Moro, Prime Minister of Italy
- Walter Kieber, Prime Minister of Liechtenstein
- Gaston Thorn, Prime Minister of Luxembourg
- Dom Mintoff, Prime Minister of Malta
- André Saint-Mleux, Minister of State of Monaco
- Trygve Bratteli, Prime Minister of Norway
- Joop den Uyl, Prime Minister of the Netherlands
- Edward Gierek, First Secretary of the Polish United Workers' Party
- Francisco da Costa Gomes, President of Portugal
- Nicolae Ceaușescu, President of Romania
- Gian Luigi Berti, Secretary of State for Foreign and Political Affairs of San Marino
- Agostino Casaroli, Cardinal Secretary of State
- Olof Palme, Prime Minister of Sweden
- Pierre Graber, President of the Swiss Confederation
- Gustáv Husák, President of Czechoslovakia
- Süleyman Demirel, Prime Minister of Turkey
- Leonid Brezhnev, General Secretary of the Communist Party of the Soviet Union
- Josip Broz Tito, President of Yugoslavia

=== International organizations ===
- Kurt Waldheim, Secretary-General of the United Nations (giving the opening speech "as their guest of honour", non-signatory)

== See also ==
- Helsinki Committee for Human Rights – country organizations
- Charter 77 and Moscow Helsinki Group, Czechoslovak and Soviet/Russian dissident initiatives that appealed to the Helsinki Accords
- Helsinki Citizens' Assembly
