= Paris Charter =

1990 non-binding European and North American political agreement

Charter of Paris for a New Europe
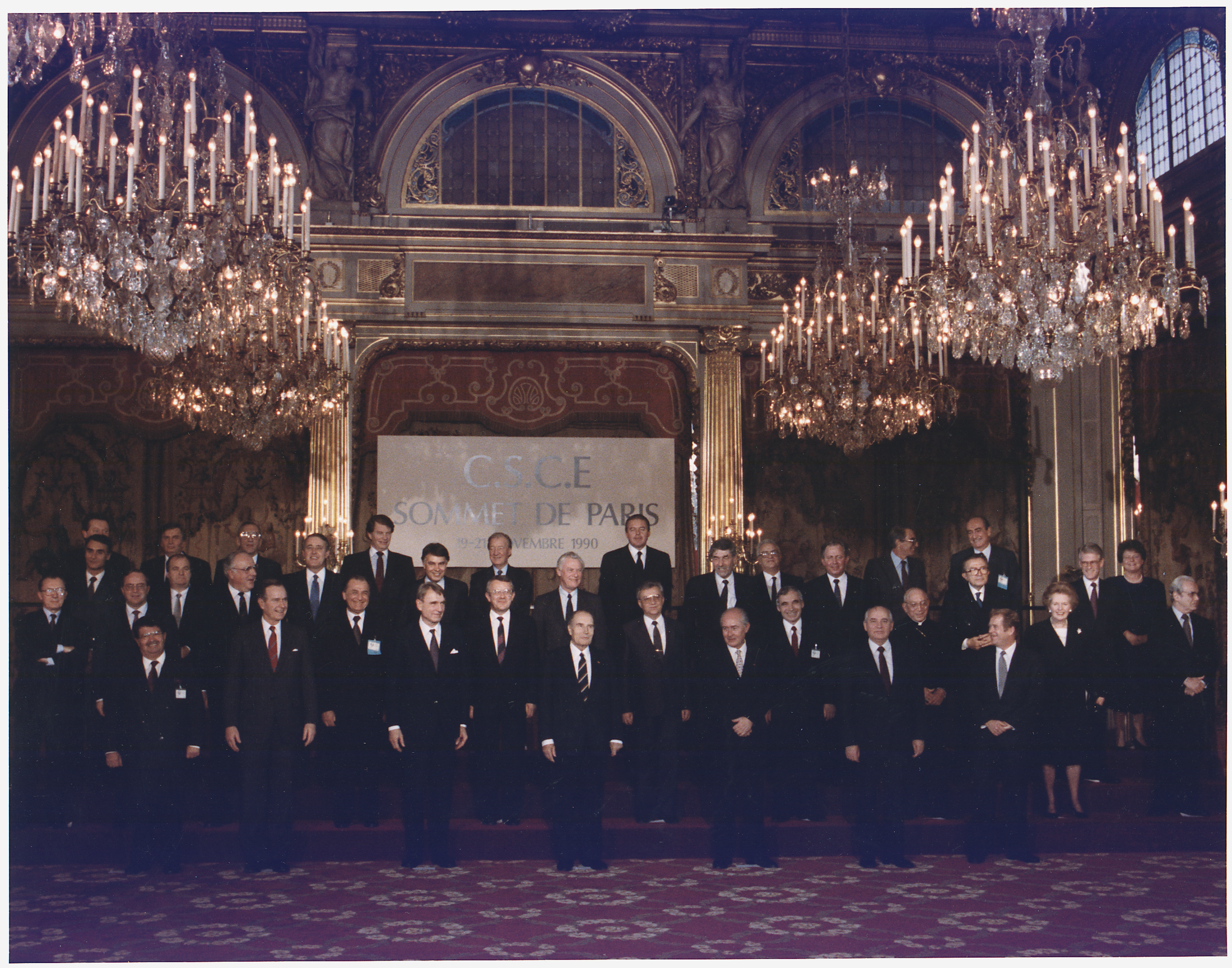
- Host country: France
- Date: 19–21 November 1990
- Cities: Paris
- Venues: Palais de l'Élysée
- Participants: Helmut Kohl; George H. W. Bush; Franz Vranitzky; Wilfried Martens; Georgi Atanasov; Brian Mulroney; George Vassiliou; Poul Schlüter; Felipe González; Mauno Koivisto; François Mitterrand; Margaret Thatcher; Konstantinos Mitsotakis; József Antall; Charles Haughey; Davíð Oddsson; Giulio Andreotti; Hans Brunhart; Jacques Santer; Eddie Fenech Adami; Jacques Dupont; Gro Harlem Brundtland; Ruud Lubbers; Wojciech Jaruzelski; Cavaco Silva; Ion Iliescu; Cesare Gasperoni; Angelo Sodano; Ingvar Carlsson; Arnold Koller; Václav Havel; Turgut Özal; Mikhail Gorbachev; Borisav Jović
- Follows: Helsinki Accords

The Charter of Paris for a New Europe (also known as the Paris Charter) was adopted by a summit meeting of most European governments in addition to those of Canada, the United States and the Soviet Union, in Paris from 19–21 November 1990. The charter was established on the foundation of the Helsinki Accords and was further amended in the 1999 Charter for European Security. Together, these documents form the agreed basis for the Organization for Security and Co-operation in Europe. However, not all OSCE member countries have signed the treaty.

== Purpose ==
The Charter was one of many attempts to seize the opportunity of the fall of Communism by actively inviting the former Eastern Bloc countries into the ideological framework of the West. It has been compared to the Conference of Versailles of 1919 or the Congress of Vienna of 1815 in its grandiose ambition to reshape Europe. In effect, the Paris Summit was the peace conference of the Cold War: Perestroika had ultimately put an end to the ideological and political division of the Iron Curtain. Pluralist democracy and market economy were together with international law and multilateralism seen as the victors.

The Charter established an Office for Free Elections (later renamed Office for Democratic Institutions and Human Rights) in Warsaw, a Conflict Prevention Centre in Vienna, and a secretariat. Later, in 1992, a Secretary General was also appointed. It was agreed that the Foreign Ministers are to convene regularly for political consultations.

British Prime Minister Margaret Thatcher attended the summit while undergoing a challenge to her leadership of the country's ruling Conservative Party, and it was while in Paris that she learned she had not obtained sufficient votes in the first round of the party's leadership election to be declared the winner outright, necessitating a further round of voting. Thatcher later claimed that the fact she was in Paris and unable to begin immediately rallying support was one of the factors that led to her leaving the leadership election and resigning as party leader and Prime Minister after 11 years of power.

== See also ==
- German reunification
