= Pierre Voizard =

Minister of State of Monaco from 1950 to 1953

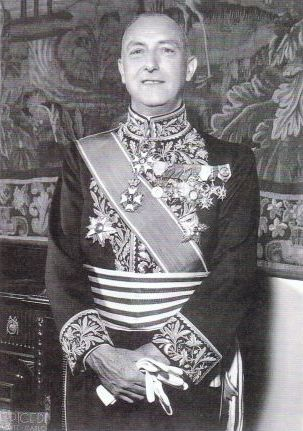
- Voizard in 1953

8th Minister of State of Monaco
- In office 1 August 1950 – 2 September 1953
- Monarch: Rainier III
- Preceded by: Jacques Léon Rueff
- Succeeded by: Henry Soum

Personal details
- Born: 22 August 1896 Lucey, Meurthe-et-Moselle, France
- Died: 26 December 1982 (aged 86) Paris, France
- Political party: Independent

Pierre Jean Paul Voizard (French pronunciation: [pjɛʁ ʒɑ̃ pɔl vwazaʁ]; 22 August 1896, Lucey, Meurthe-et-Moselle – 26 December 1982) was a Minister of State for Monaco. He served between 1950 and 1953.

He subsequently served as Resident General of France in the French Protectorate of Tunisia from 1953 to 1954.

Political offices
Preceded by Jacques Léon Rueff	Minister of State of Monaco; 1950–1953	Succeeded by Henry Soum
