= Fernand Gregh =

French poet and literary critic (1873–1960)

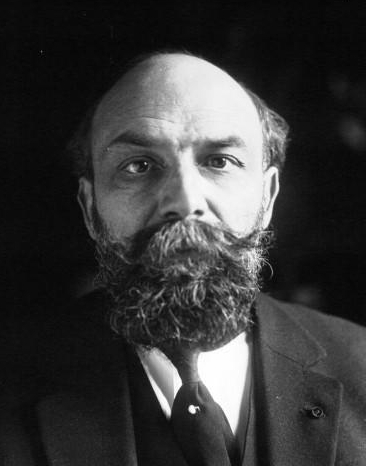

Fernand Gregh (14 October 1873, Paris – 5 January 1960, Paris) was a French poet and literary critic. He was accepted in the Académie française in 1953. British composer Eva Ruth Spalding set some of his poems to music.

He wrote the poem Reverie in Central Park.

He is the father of François-Didier Gregh.
