= Émile Flach =

Minister of State of Monaco from 1911 to 1917

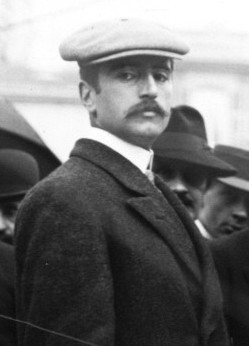
- Émile Flach by Georges Prade. 1911.

1st Minister of State of Monaco
- In office 5 February 1911 – 31 December 1917
- Monarch: Albert I
- Succeeded by: Georges Jaloustre (acting); Raymond Le Bourdon

Personal details
- Born: 24 February 1853
- Died: 17 February 1926 (aged 72)
- Political party: Independent

Émile Flach was the first Minister of State for Monaco. He served between 1911 and 1917. He was born in 1853 and died in 1926 at the age of 72.

Political offices
Preceded by Position established	Minister of State of Monaco; 1911–1917	Succeeded by Georges Jaloustre
