= Conference on Security and Co-operation in Europe =

1973–1994 intergovernmental security organisation, now the OSCE

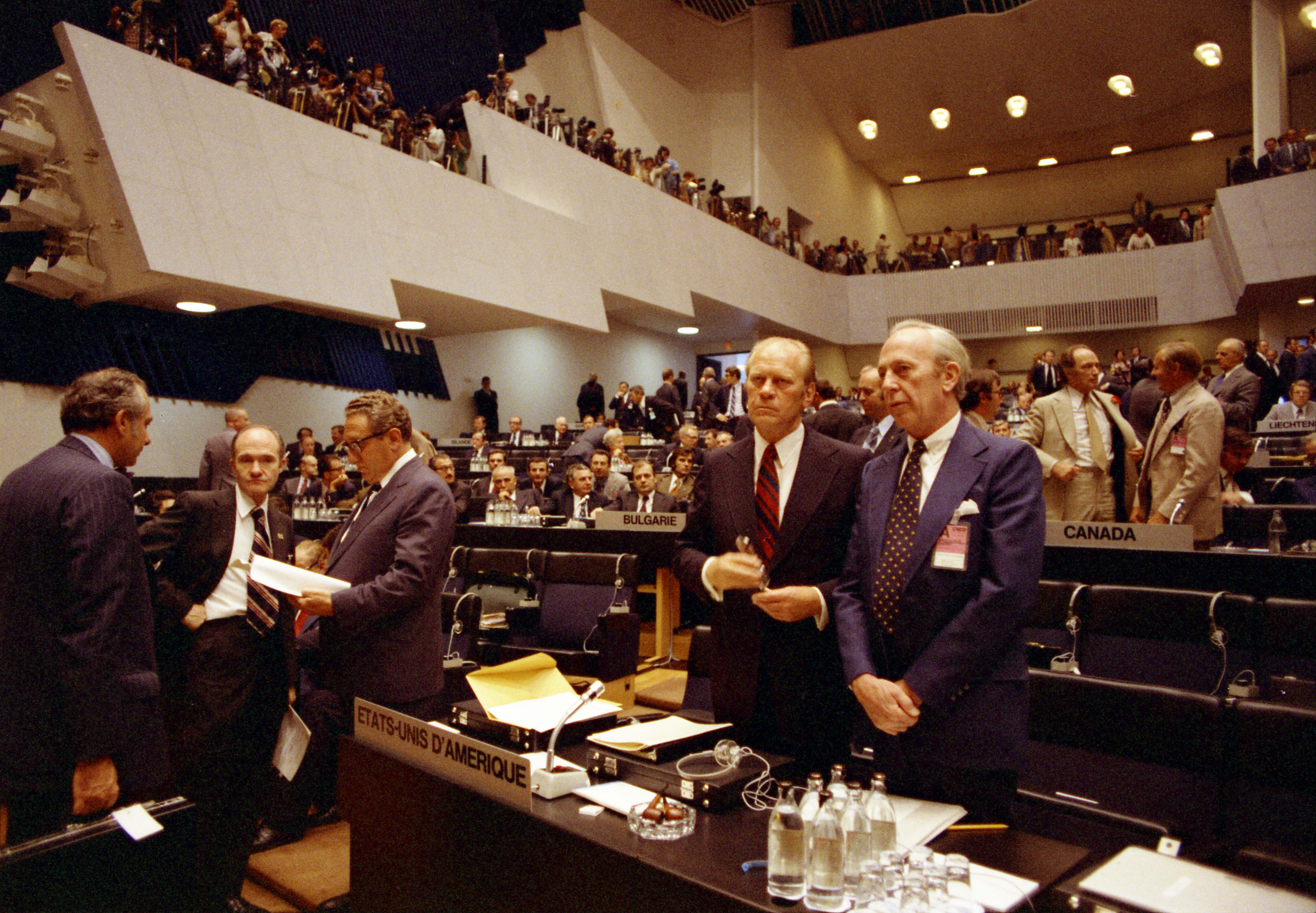
Gerald Ford and members of the American delegation at the Helsinki summit in July 1975

The Conference on Security and Cooperation in Europe (CSCE) was a key element of the détente process during the Cold War. Although it did not have the force of a treaty, it recognized the boundaries of postwar Europe and established a mechanism for minimizing political and military tensions between East and West and improving human rights in the Communist Bloc. The first phase was the Meeting of Foreign Ministers in Helsinki in 1973, the second negotiations held in Geneva from 1973 to 1975, and the third the Helsinki summit in 1975. The final document was signed in Helsinki, Finland, on August 1, 1975, by 33 European nations, the United States and Canada. It is often called the Helsinki Agreement. In 1994, the Organisation for Security and Cooperation in Europe (OSCE) was established as a successor to CSCE.

== Background ==
The Soviet Union had been politically confronted following the Warsaw Pact invasion of Czechoslovakia in 1968. In addition, it had lost its grip on the communist parties of the West (see Eurocommunism) and its ideological differences with China had polarized the worldwide communist movement between the leadership of Moscow and Beijing in 1969. The Soviet leadership realized that none of these problems could be resolved by explaining or patching up relations, but that the Soviet Union could only improve its position by opening a new diplomatic front. In April 1969, therefore, it proposed the organization of a European Security Conference in the same way as it had done in 1954.

In Finland, it was known that a positive response to the Soviet conference initiative would increasingly link Finland to Soviet influence in the eyes of the Western world. On the other hand, President Urho Kekkonen knew, on the basis of the note crisis in the autumn of 1961, that the militarily tinted political tension in Central Europe was not good for Finland. The security meeting could help Europe to recover from the shock of the occupation of Czechoslovakia if it were a real negotiating forum and not just a propaganda scene like previous attempts. Thus, Finland decided to make its own proposal, which differed from the initiative of the Soviet Union, in that the recognition of two Germanys would not be a threshold issue for holding a meeting, including the United States and Canada and Finland, which would offer to host the conference. Finland's starting positions in the conference project were more advantageous than other countries because Finland had not recognized either Germany, but rather managed its relations equally with both Germanies, albeit with a low profile. Before going to Helsinki, US President Gerald Ford held a meeting with a group of Eastern European-Americans, where he firmly declared that the political attitude of the United States towards the situation of the Baltic states would not change. The line would only be strengthened, as the agreement provided that the illegal seizure of the territories of another country was contrary to international law.

The Finnish initiative received a lukewarm reception in the West and Finland was not initially expected to receive more extensive support. NATO generally thought that the conference would not have the potential for success before the German issue was resolved. By the end of August 1969, 20 of the countries invited had replied in the affirmative. The only absolute refuser was China's ally and its European mouthpiece Albania. However, light began to appear at the end of the tunnel when Willy Brandt became Chancellor of West Germany in October 1969. In February 1970, Urho Kekkonen appointed The Finnish Ambassador to Stockholm, Ralph Enckell, as a travelling ambassador, who was tasked with keeping in touch with the governments of the invited countries, collecting information and preparing for the meeting. The negotiating arrangements became clearer during the spring of 1970. The Warsaw Pact stressed the persistence of the borders resulting from the Second World War, the abstention of violence and the improvement of commercial-technical links, while NATO's main focus was on mutually subtracting forces. There were differences in the emphases, but neither side considered the other's proposals to be unreasonable. In November 1970, the issue was so far advanced that Finland proposed negotiations at the ambassador level on the agenda and procedures of the conference.

== First and second phase ==
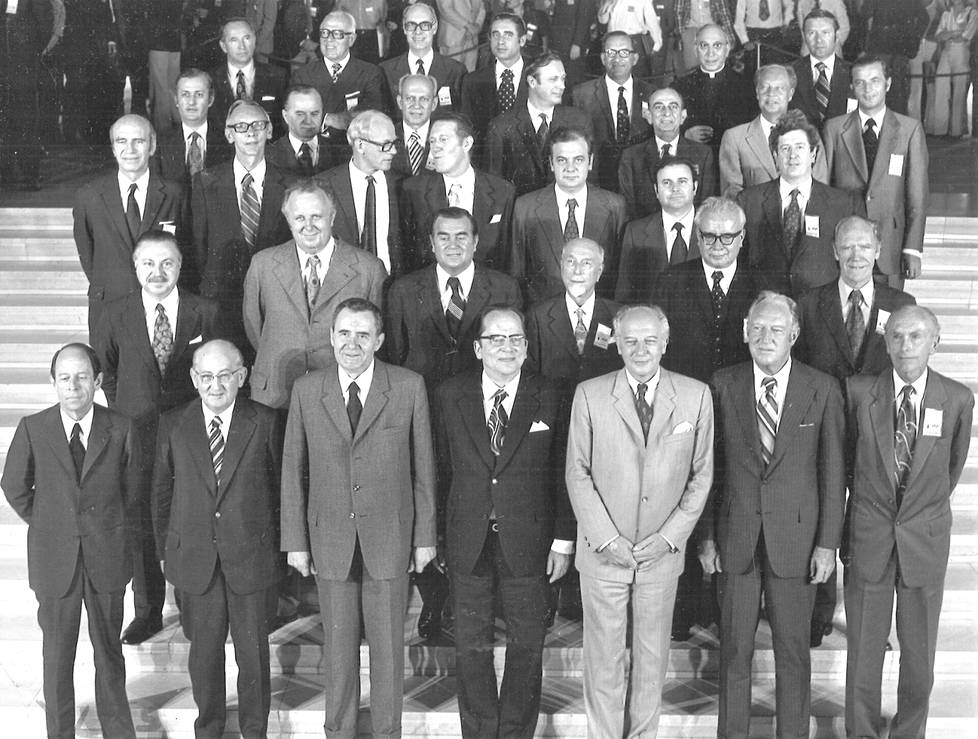
All the foreign ministers taking part in the CSCE conference in Helsinki in 1973 (the first in the middle is Ahti Karjalainen)

The first phase of the security conference was held at the foreign minister level at Finlandia Hall in Helsinki from 3 to 7 July 1973. The meeting was hosted by Foreign Minister Ahti Karjalainen. The meeting was also attended by UN Secretary-General Kurt Waldheim. No actual political decisions were taken at this meeting, as that was not the intention of the first phase. Instead, the aim was to bring together the results of the preparatory meetings held in Dipoli, Espoo since November 1972, and to map out the second or main phase of the conference.

After the first phase of the meeting, in a good and confidential atmosphere, Foreign Minister Ahti Karjalainen described the special "Spirit of Helsinki". The second phase of the security conference was in the negotiations held in Geneva, Switzerland, which began in September 1973 and lasted until spring 1975. The worst stumbling block of the negotiations was the free movement of people and knowledge, which was considered ideological in the Eastern Bloc; on the other hand, it was able to agree on non-interference in the internal affairs of other states, on the inviolability of borders between states, and on the framework for economic, scientific and cultural cooperation. The negotiating climate in Geneva did not improve in the expulsion of Nobel Prize-winner Aleksandr Solzhenitsyn from the Soviet Union in February 1974 and the earlier strong campaign by the Soviet authorities against him. The rather sticky progress of the negotiations seemed to postpone the third stage, the summit, because Finland would not have had enough time to make arrangements. After the Soviet Union's concessions, the summit could eventually be held in Helsinki on the original schedule.

== Summit ==
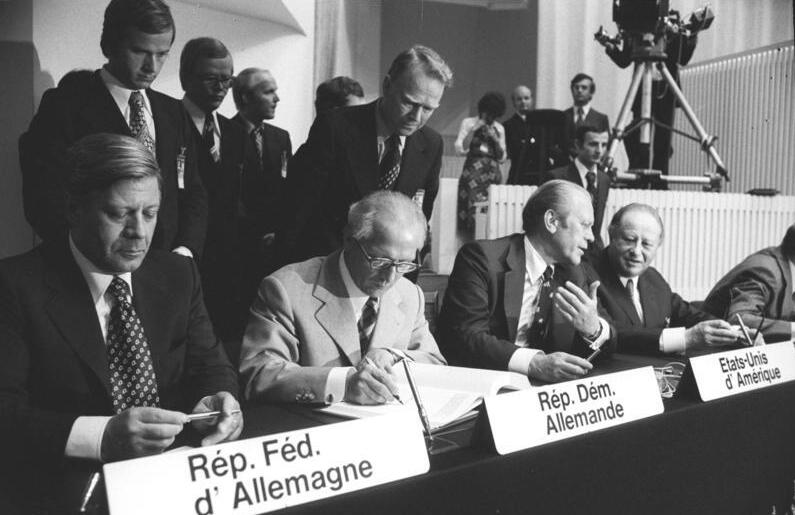
Helmut Schmidt of the Federal Republic of Germany, Erich Honecker of the German Democratic Republic, Gerald Ford of the United States and Bruno Kreisky of Austria at the OSCE Conference in Helsinki in 1975

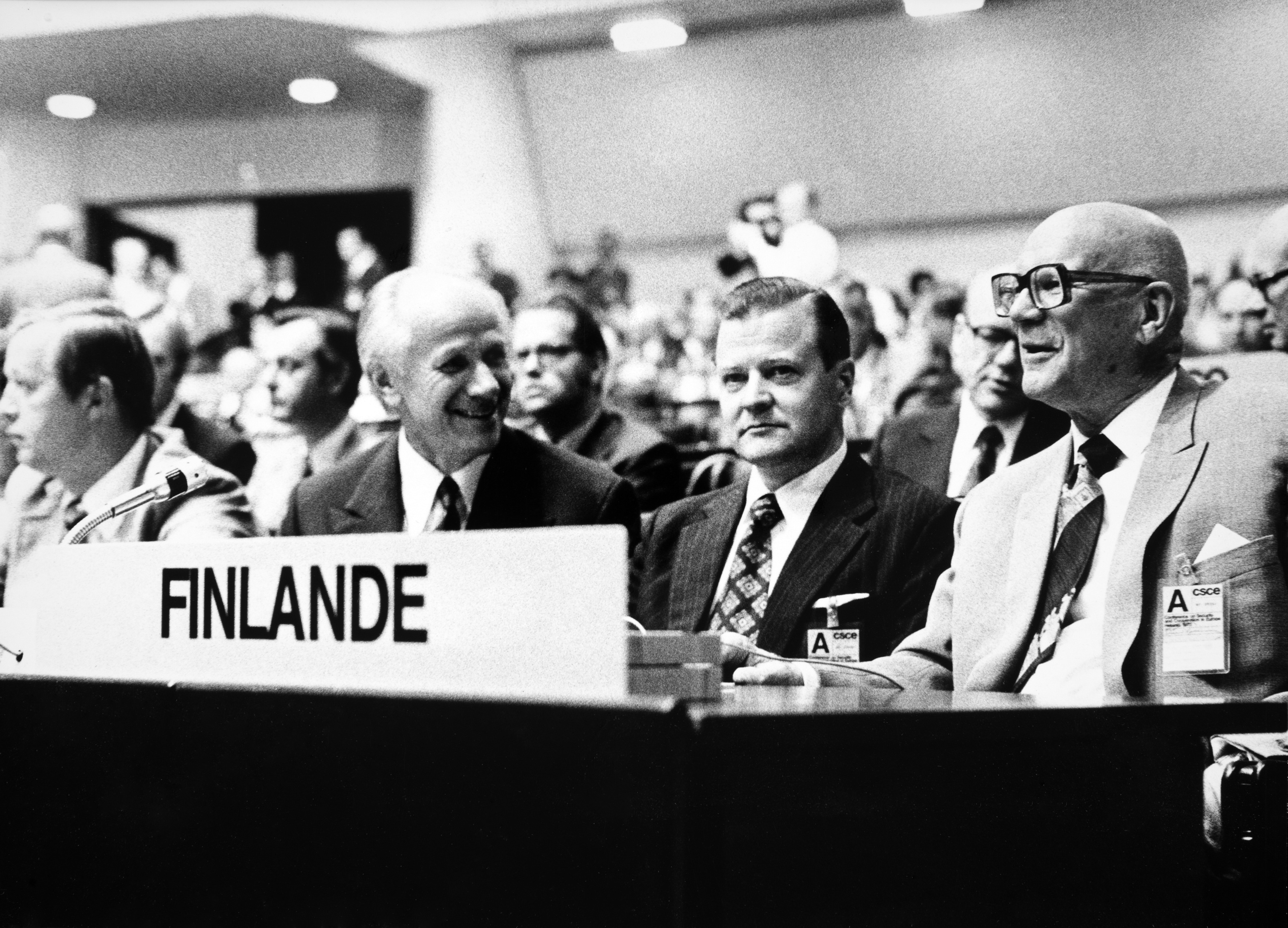
Finland's Minister of Foreign Affairs Olavi J. Mattila, Prime Minister Keijo Liinamaa and President Urho Kekkonen.

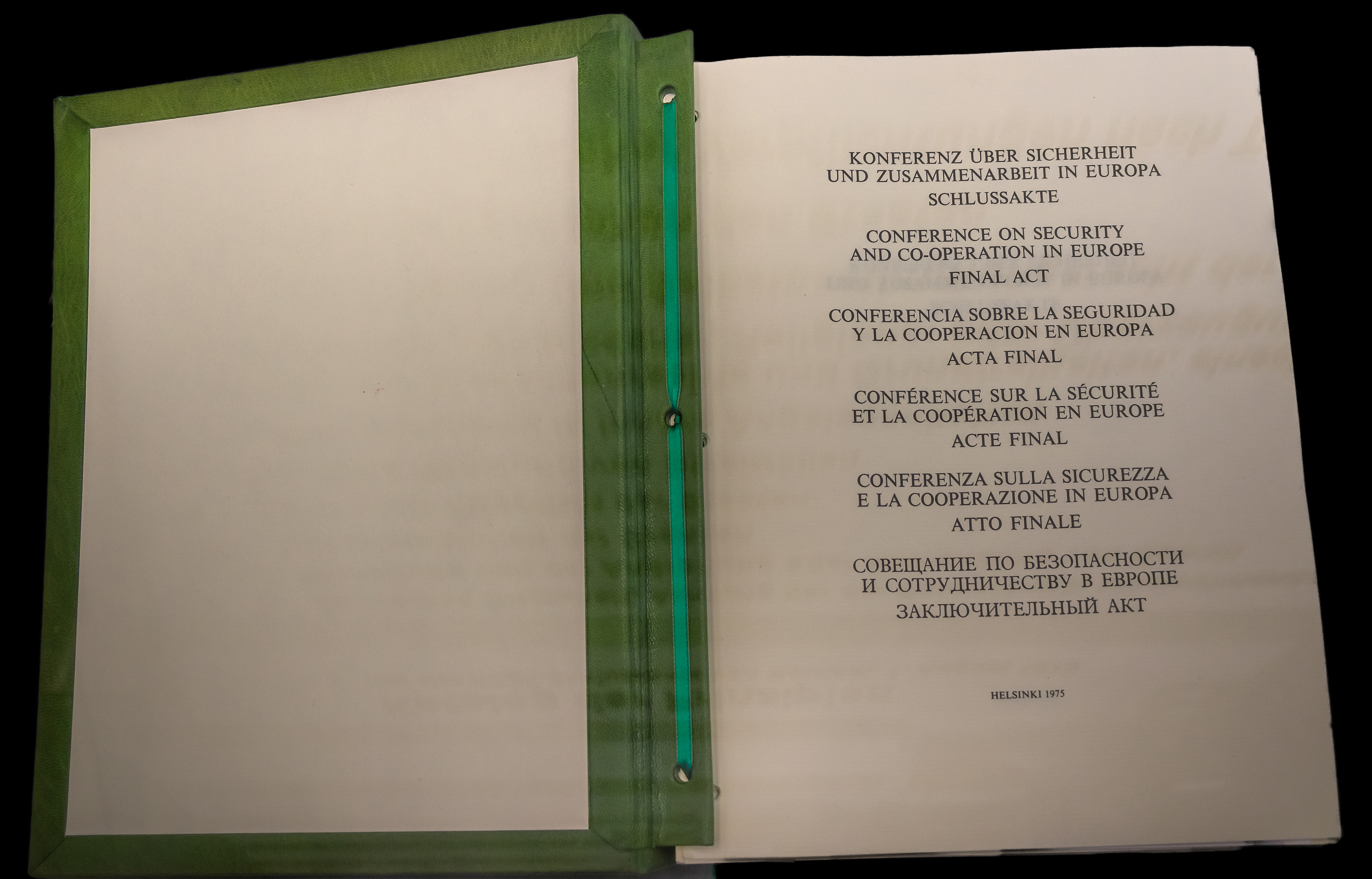
The Helsinki Accords, the final act of the Conference on Security and Co-operation in Europe, which was signed in Helsinki in 1975 by the US, Canada and 33 European countries. Exhibited in the House of History in Bonn.

The OSCE Summit was held at Finlandia Hall in Helsinki at the end of July and the beginning of August 1975. The final phase of the OSCE was opened by Agostino Casaroli, Cardinal State Secretary of the Holy See, who chaired the final phase. The heads of state of 35 included all European countries except Albania and Andorra, as well as the United States and Canada. The meeting was attended by

- Helmut Schmidt, Chancellor of the Federal Republic of Germany
- Erich Honecker, First Secretary of the Central Committee of the Socialist Unity Party of Germany
- Gerald Ford, President of the United States
- Bruno Kreisky, Chancellor of Austria
- Leo Tindemans, Prime Minister of Belgium
- Todor Zhivkov, Chairman of the State Council of Bulgaria
- Pierre Trudeau, Prime Minister of Canada
- Makarios III, President of Cyprus
- Anker Jørgensen, Prime Minister of Denmark
- Carlos Arias Navarro, Prime Minister of Spain
- Urho Kekkonen, President of Finland
- Valéry Giscard d’Estaing, President of France (who also serves as Co-Prince of Andorra however no such function at all is mentioned in the declaration)
- Harold Wilson, Prime Minister of the United Kingdom
- Konstantinos Karamanlis, Prime Minister of Greece
- János Kádár, First Secretary of the Central Committee of the Hungarian Socialist Workers' Party
- Liam Cosgrave, Taoiseach of Ireland
- Geir Hallgrímsson, Prime Minister of Iceland
- Aldo Moro, Prime Minister of Italy
- Walter Kieber, Prime Minister of Liechtenstein
- Gaston Thorn, Prime Minister of Luxembourg
- Dom Mintoff, Prime Minister of Malta
- André Saint-Mleux, Minister of State of Monaco
- Trygve Bratteli, Prime Minister of Norway
- Joop den Uyl, Prime Minister of the Netherlands
- Edward Gierek, First Secretary of the Polish United Workers' Party
- Francisco da Costa Gomes, President of Portugal
- Nicolae Ceaușescu, President of Romania
- Gian Luigi Berti, Captain Regent of San Marino
- Agostino Casaroli, Cardinal Secretary of State
- Olof Palme, Prime Minister of Sweden
- Pierre Graber, President of the Swiss Confederation
- Gustáv Husák, President of Czechoslovakia
- Süleyman Demirel, Prime Minister of Turkey
- Leonid Brezhnev, General Secretary of the Communist Party of the Soviet Union
- Josip Broz Tito, President of Yugoslavia

It was historic that the heads of state of West and East Germany sat at the same table in Helsinki for the first time. The heads of state had several bilateral and multilateral meetings during the official programme.

On 1 August, the final act of the meeting was signed, the Helsinki Accords. The signing was started by Chancellor Schmidt and was finished by Yugoslav President Josip Broz Tito. The final document was divided into four main sections. The first dealt with European security issues, the second decided on cooperation in areas such as economy, science and environmental protection, the third concerned cooperation in the humanitarian fields, and the fourth on the follow-up to the conference and future meetings.

== Impact ==
The Soviet Union appeared pleased about the OSCE Accords first section, which guaranteed the integrity of the state boundaries resulting from the Second World War and the 1947 Paris Peace Treaty. The Soviet leaders also expected a great deal from the second section of economic cooperation between East and West, but in practice it remained formal due to the differences between the western market economy and the eastern planned economy.

In general, the Helsinki Conference was expected to become a conclusion for the Cold War. However, the confrontation between East and West was increased shortly after the OSCE. The parties still had doubts as to the need to continue the process. In the second half of the 1970s, the Cold War expanded from Europe to third world countries, and in the early 1980s Europe was plunged into a spiral of missile armament between NATO and the Warsaw Pact.

After the meeting, the international press began to talk generally about the "spirit of Helsinki," and the term détente is often associated with the OSCE summit. Finland's international position was in any case strengthened. The OSCE's foreign participants recognized Helsinki as neutral soil, and Finland was then able to emphasize its neutrality on many occasions.

Jimmy Carter, elected president of the United States after Gerald Ford, made the defense of human rights around the world a key objective of American foreign policy. This led to clashes with the Soviet Union at the OSCE follow-up meetings, the first of which took place in Belgrade in 1977, and then in Madrid in 1979. When Ronald Reagan replaced Carter in 1981, OSCE seemed to go into oblivion. Reagan resigned from the very beginning from the OSCE because, in his opinion, it legalized the belonging of the Eastern European countries in the Soviet zone. However, after the break-up of the Soviet Union, it became increasingly thought that the third section of the OSCE had quietly undermined the one-party system.

The first OSCE follow-up meeting took place in October 1977 in Belgrade. Later, an OSCE follow-up meeting was held in Helsinki in 1992. In 1994, the Organisation for Security and Cooperation in Europe (OSCE) was established as a successor to the CSCE.

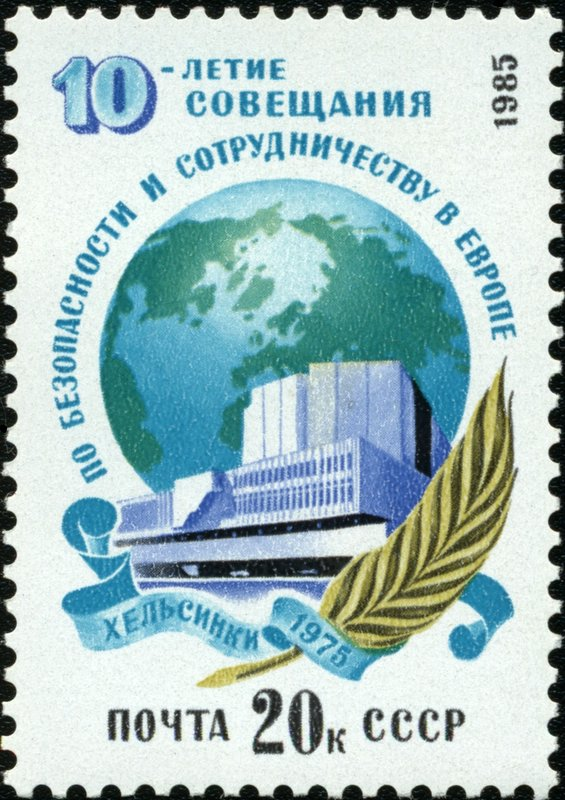
A USSR stamp, 10th Anniversary of European Security and Co-operation Conference

The 10th anniversary meeting of the CSCE was held at Finlandia Hall at the foreign minister level at the end of July and beginning of August 1985. The tense international climate was illustrated by the fact that Soviet Foreign Minister Eduard Ševardnadze criticized the United States for their unwillingness to negotiate an arms limitation treaty, while US Secretary of State George Shultz listed by name the cases in which he considered the Soviet Union to have violated human rights. President Mauno Koivisto met Shultz, Ševardnadze and other foreign ministers. At the end of the meeting, no document was signed.

President Ramiz Alia of Albania, who did not attend the 1975 summit, signed the OSCE Accord in Helsinki on 16 September 1991. Later in 1991, the leaders of the Baltic states, Arnold Rüütel of Estonia, Anatolis Gorbunovs of Latvia and Vytautas Landsbergis of Lithuania signed the accord. In February 1992, the accord was signed by the heads of state of the former Soviet republics of Ukraine, Belarus, Moldova, Tajikistan and Uzbekistan. At the 1992 follow-up meeting, the signatories were Slovenia, Croatia, Bosnia and Herzegovina, Armenia, Azerbaijan, Georgia, Kazakhstan, Kyrgyzstan, and Turkmenistan.

== See also ==
- Organization for Security and Co-operation in Europe
- Neutral and Non-Aligned European States
