= Henry Soum =

Minister of State of Monaco from 1953 to 1959

9th Minister of State of Monaco
- In office 15 November 1953 – 12 February 1959
- Monarch: Rainier III
- Preceded by: Pierre Voizard
- Succeeded by: Émile Pelletier

Personal details
- Born: 29 December 1899 Carcassonne, France
- Died: 24 August 1983 (aged 83) Aix-en-Provence, France
- Party: Independent

Henry Jules Joseph Pierre Soum (29 December 1899 – 24 August 1983) was a préfet of the Doubs (27 March 1943 – 17 November 1944) then Minister of State for Monaco. He served between 1953 and 1959. He was born in 1899 and died in 1983.

Political offices
Preceded by Pierre Voizard	Minister of State of Monaco; 1953–1959	Succeeded by Émile Pelletier
