= Pierre Blanchy =

Acting Minister of State of Monaco (1944; 1949; 1962–1963)

Acting Minister of State of Monaco
- In office 23 January 1962 – 16 August 1963
- Monarch: Rainier III
- Preceded by: Émile Pelletier
- Succeeded by: Jean Reymond
- In office 4 January 1949 – 12 July 1949
- Monarchs: Louis II; Rainier III
- Preceded by: Pierre de Witasse
- Succeeded by: Jacques Rueff
- In office 29 September 1944 – 13 October 1944
- Monarch: Louis II
- Preceded by: Emile Roblot
- Succeeded by: Pierre de Witasse

Personal details
- Born: 14 August 1897
- Died: 15 February 1981 (aged 83)
- Political party: Independent

Pierre Blanchy (French pronunciation: [pjɛʁ blɑ̃ʃi]; 14 August 1897 – 15 February 1981) was a French politician, who served as acting Minister of State for Monaco three times between 1944 and 1963, serving under the monarchy of both Rainier III and Louis II. He was succeeded by Jean Reymond for the final time in 1963 after dedicated service of nearly 20 years.

In March 1963, he was put in charge of Monaco's External Relations.

In 1966, after the Société des bains de mer de Monaco was restructured, Blanchy joined the board of the company.

Blanchy held an odd resemblance to Benito Mussolini.

== Distinctions ==
- Knight Grand Cross of the Order of Saint Charles

Political offices
Preceded by Emile Roblot	Minister of State of Monaco; 1944–1944	Succeeded by Pierre de Witasse

Political offices
Preceded by Pierre de Witasse	Minister of State of Monaco; 1949–1949	Succeeded by Jacques Rueff

Political offices
Preceded by Émile Pelletier	Minister of State of Monaco; 1962–1963	Succeeded by Jean Reymond
