= Jean Reymond =

Minister of State of Monaco from 1963 to 1966

Jean-Émile Reymond

11th Minister of State of Monaco
- In office 16 August 1963 – 29 December 1966
- Monarch: Rainier III
- Preceded by: Pierre Blanchy (acting)
- Succeeded by: Paul Demange

Personal details
- Born: 2 May 1912 Saint-Bonnet-de-Valclérieux, France
- Died: 12 April 1992 (aged 79) Paris, France
- Political party: Independent

Jean-Émile Reymond (French pronunciation: [ʒɑ̃ emil ʁɛmɔ̃]; 2 May 1912 – 12 April 1992) was a Monacan politician who was the minister of state for the country. He was in office from 16 August 1963 until 29 December 1966. Reymond died in Paris on 12 April 1992, at the age of 79.

Political offices
Preceded by Pierre Blanchy	Minister of State of Monaco; 1963–1966	Succeeded by Paul Demange
