= Paul Dijoud =

Minister of State of Monaco from 1994 to 1997

18th Minister of State of Monaco
- In office 2 December 1994 – 3 February 1997
- Monarch: Rainier III
- Preceded by: Jacques Dupont
- Succeeded by: Michel Lévêque

Personal details
- Born: 25 June 1938 (age 87) Neuilly-sur-Seine, France
- Political party: Independent

Paul Dijoud (French pronunciation: [pɔl diʒu]; born 25 June 1938) is an ex-minister of state for Monaco. He was in office from 1994 to 1997.

Dijoud was born in Neuilly-sur-Seine. He served as French ambassador to Colombia (1988–1991), Mexico (1992–1994) and Argentina (1997–2003).

Political offices
Preceded by Jacques Dupont	Minister of State of Monaco; 1994–1997	Succeeded by Michel Lévêque
