= Pierre de Witasse =

Minister of State of Monaco from 1944 to 1948

6th Minister of State of Monaco
- In office 13 October 1944 – December 1948
- Monarch: Louis II
- Preceded by: Pierre Blanchy (acting)
- Succeeded by: Pierre Blanchy (acting)

Personal details
- Born: 6 August 1878 Senlis, France
- Died: 26 November 1956 (aged 78) Paris, France
- Political party: Independent

Pierre de Witasse (6 August 1878 – 26 November 1956) was a Minister of State for Monaco. He was in office from 1944 to 1948.

Political offices
Preceded by Pierre Blanchy	Minister of State of Monaco; 1944–1948	Succeeded by Pierre Blanchy
