= Émile Pelletier =

French civil servant and politician (1898–1975)

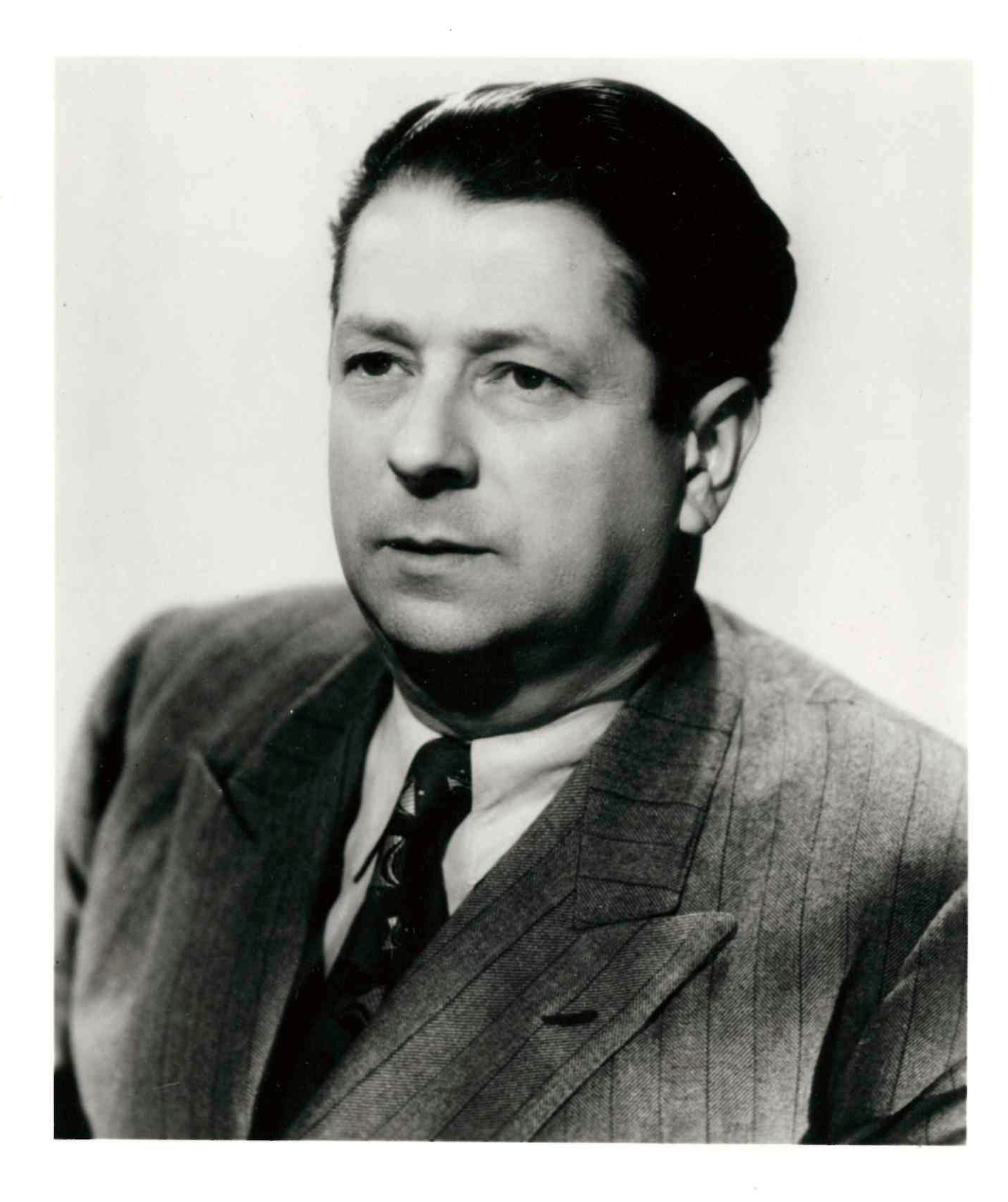

10th Minister of State of Monaco
- In office 12 February 1959 – 23 January 1962
- Monarch: Rainier III
- Preceded by: Henry Soum
- Succeeded by: Pierre Blanchy (acting)

Personal details
- Born: 11 February 1898 Saint-Brieuc, France
- Died: 15 December 1975 (aged 77) Toulouse, France
- Party: Independent

Émile Pelletier (French pronunciation: [emil pɛltje]; 11 February 1898, in Saint-Brieuc – 15 December 1975) was Interior Minister of France from 1958 to 1959, and a Minister of State of Monaco from 1959 to 1962.

He was Prefect of the Somme from 1940 to 1942, of the Aisne from 1942 to 1943, of Seine-et-Marne from 1945 to 1947, of Haute-Garonne from 1947 to 1955, and of the Seine from 1955 to 1958.

== Honors and awards ==
- Commander of the Order of Legion of Honour
- Croix de guerre 1939-1945
- Resistance Medal
- Commander of the Ordre National du Mérite

Political offices
Preceded by Henry Soum	Minister of State of Monaco; 1959–1962	Succeeded by Pierre Blanchy
