= Patrick Leclercq =

Minister of State of Monaco from 2000 to 2005

20th Minister of State of Monaco
- In office 29 March 2000 – 1 May 2005
- Monarchs: Rainier III; Albert II
- Preceded by: Michel Lévêque
- Succeeded by: Jean-Paul Proust

Ambassador of France to Spain
- In office 1996–2000
- Monarch: Juan Carlos I

Personal details
- Born: 2 August 1938 (age 87) Lille, France
- Political party: Independent
- Education: Lycée Janson-de-Sailly
- Alma mater: Sciences Po, ÉNA

Patrick André Leclercq (French pronunciation: [patʁik ɑ̃dʁe ləklɛʁ]; born 2 August 1938) was the Minister of State of Monaco. He was chosen by Rainier III, Prince of Monaco in December 1999, to replace Michel Lévêque, who retired a few days later. He had previously served as France's consul / ambassador to Spain, Egypt (Jordan), Montreal (Canada), as well as in the Foreign Ministry.

Patrick André Leclercq was born in Lille, attended the prestigious Lycée Janson-de-Sailly in Paris earning his Baccalauréat, graduated from Sciences Po and the École nationale d'administration (ENA).

He was due to formally step down on 1 May 2005 and to be replaced by Jean-Paul Proust, but Proust's inauguration was deferred for a few weeks owing to the death of ruling Prince Rainier.

He was subsequently appointed to the board of the Monegasque company Société des Bains de Mer, and he holds the Order of Saint-Charles.

== Honours ==
=== Foreign honours ===
- Monaco
  - Grand Officer of the Order of Saint-Charles (18 November 2002)

Preceded by Michel Lévêque	Minister of State of Monaco; 2000–2005	Succeeded by Jean-Paul Proust
