= Raymond Le Bourdon =

Minister of State of Monaco from 1919 to 1923

2nd Minister of State of Monaco
- In office 19 February 1919 – 11 August 1923
- Monarchs: Albert I Louis II
- Preceded by: Georges Jaloustre (acting); Émile Flach
- Succeeded by: Maurice Piette

Personal details
- Born: 18 March 1861
- Died: 22 September 1937 (aged 76)
- Political party: Independent

Raymond Joseph Marie Le Bourdon (French pronunciation: [ʁɛmɔ̃ ʒozɛf maʁi lə buʁdɔ̃]; 18 March 1861 – 22 September 1937) was an ex-minister of state for Monaco. He served between 1919 and 1923.

== See also ==
- Ministers of state of Monaco

Political offices
Preceded by Georges Jaloustre	Minister of State of Monaco; 1919–1923	Succeeded by Maurice Piette
