= Jean Ausseil =

Minister of State of Monaco from 1985 to 1991

16th Minister of State of Monaco
- In office 16 September 1985 – 16 February 1991
- Monarch: Rainier III
- Preceded by: Jean Herly
- Succeeded by: Jacques Dupont

Personal details
- Born: 30 April 1925 Vincennes, France
- Died: 4 February 2001 (aged 75) Madrid, Spain
- Party: Independent

Jean Jacques Charles Ausseil (30 April 1925 – 4 February 2001) was a French Minister of State for Monaco between 1985 and 1991. He also served as ambassador to Uruguay (1975–1978) and Ethiopia (1978–1980).

== Biography ==
Jean was appointed as Ambassador to Uruguay, where he succeeded Ambassador Français, handing over his accreditation on 19 March 1975. He remained in this post until 15 March 1978, when he was succeeded by Ambassador Le Guen. He was then appointed Ambassador to Ethiopia, where he presented his credentials on 24 May 1978, succeeding Ambassador Barbier. He held this position until he was replaced by Ambassador Bry on 31 October 1980.

On 16 September 1985 Jean Ausseil was appointed as Minister of State of Monaco (Ministre d'État de Monaco), succeeding Jean Lucien Emile Herly. He held this post as head of the government of Monaco until 16 February 1991, at which point Jacques Pierre Dupont replaced him.

== Bibliography ==
- Dictionnaire biographique des protestants français de 1787 a nos jours - tome 1 : a-c (in French). PARIS. 15 January 2015. ISBN 978-2-84621-190-1.

Political offices
Preceded by Jean Herly	Minister of State of Monaco; 1985–1991	Succeeded by Jacques Dupont
