= Georges Jaloustre =

Acting Minister of State of Monaco from 1918 to 1919

Acting Minister of State of Monaco
- In office January 1918 – February 1919
- Monarch: Albert I
- Preceded by: Émile Flach
- Succeeded by: Raymond Le Bourdon

Personal details
- Born: 26 October 1875 Puy de Dôme, Auvergne, France
- Died: 6 January 1951 (aged 75) Puy de Dôme, Auvergne, France
- Political party: Independent

Georges Cirgues Antoine Jaloustre (French pronunciation: [ʒɔʁʒ siʁɡ ɑ̃twan ʒalustʁ]; 26 October 1875 – 6 January 1951) was a Minister of State for Monaco. He served between 1918 and 1919. He died on 6 January 1951 at the age of 75.

Political offices
Preceded by Émile Flach	Minister of State of Monaco; 1918–1919	Succeeded by Raymond Le Bourdon
