= Jean Herly =

Minister of State of Monaco from 1981 to 1985

His Excellency Jean Herly
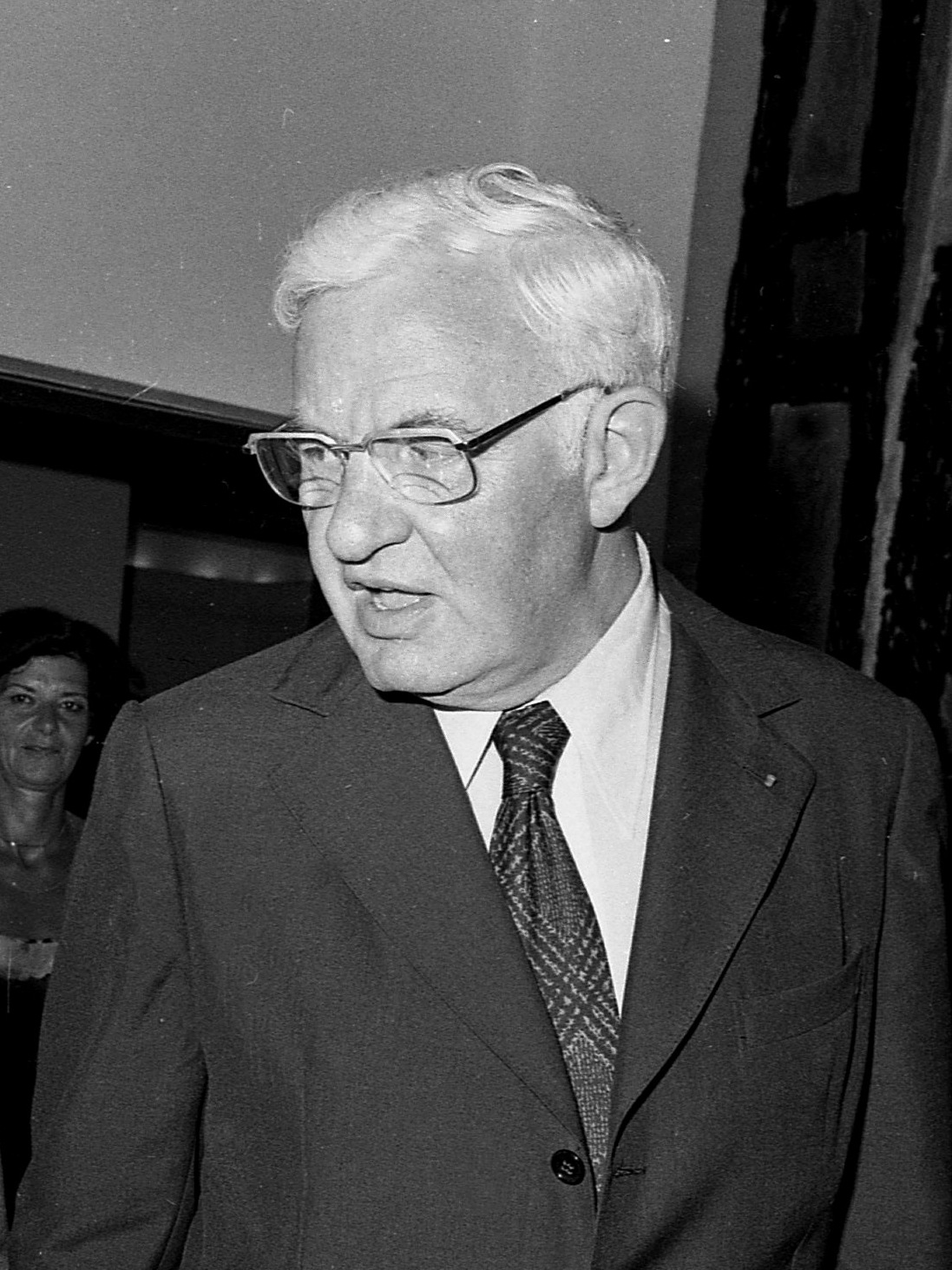
- Jean Herly in 1977

15th Minister of State of Monaco
- In office 16 February 1981 – 2 December 1985
- Monarch: Rainier III
- Preceded by: André Saint-Mleux
- Succeeded by: Jean Ausseil

Personal details
- Born: 15 September 1920 Grosbliederstroff, France
- Died: 17 November 1998 (aged 78) Bonn, Germany
- Political party: Independent

Jean Herly (French pronunciation: [ʒɑ̃ ɛʁli]; 15 September 1920 – 17 November 1998) was a Minister of State for Monaco. He served between 1981 and 1985.

== Biography ==
Jean Herly was born in Grosbliederstroff in France, the first of two children. He studied law at the University of Paris, and stayed at the diplomatic school of the French government.

== Career ==
- Services overseas, 1946–1962
- First Secretary in the Embassy of France to Japan, 1959–1962
- Consul General of France to Germany, location Düsseldorf, 1964–1966
- Ambassador of France to Central African Republic and Chief of the services of the French-speaking in the south of Africa and of the Sahara, 1969–1973
- Ambassador extraordinary and plenipotentiary of France to Israel, location Tel-Aviv, 1973–1977
- Ambassador extraordinary and plenipotentiary of France to Morocco, location Rabat, 1978–1980
- Diplomatic Counselor of the French government, 1980
- Director of African and Madagascan affairs in the French ministry of foreign affairs, 1980–1981
- Minister of State of the Principality of Monaco, 1981–1985
- Ambassador extraordinary and plenipotentiary of His Most Serene Highness the Prince Rainier III of Monaco to Switzerland, location Berne, 1985–1991
- Ambassador extraordinary and plenipotentiary of His Most Serene Highness the Prince Rainier III of Monaco to Germany, location Bonn, 1991–1998
- Death in service as Ambassador extraordinary and plenipotentiary of His Most Serene Highness the Prince Rainier III of Monaco to Germany in 1998, location Bonn.

== Awards and honors ==
=== French honors ===
- Commander of the National Order of the Legion of Honour
- Commander of the National Order of Merit
- Recipient of the Colonial Medal
- Officer of the Order of the Arts and the Letters

=== Monegasque honors ===
- Grand Officer of the Order of Saint Charles

=== Foreign honors ===
- Sovereign Military Order of Malta:
  - Grand-Cross of the Order pro Merito Melitensi
- Central African Republic:
  - Grand Officer of the Order of Central African Merit
- Senegal:
  - Commander of the National Order of the Lion
- Côte d'Ivoire:
  - Commander of the National Order of the Ivory Coast

=== Awards ===
- Croix de guerre des théâtres d’opérations extérieures, France

Political offices
Preceded by André Saint-Mleux	Minister of State of Monaco; 1981–1985	Succeeded by Jean Ausseil
