= Michel Lévêque =

Minister of State of Monaco from 1997 to 2000

His Excellency Michel Lévêque

19th Minister of State of Monaco
- In office 3 February 1997 – 5 January 2000
- Monarch: Rainier III
- Preceded by: Paul Dijoud
- Succeeded by: Patrick Leclercq

Personal details
- Born: 19 July 1933 (age 92) Algiers, Algeria
- Political party: Independent

Michel Lévêque (French pronunciation: [miʃɛl levɛk]; born 19 July 1933) is a French diplomat and politician. From 1997 to 2000 he was minister of state for Monaco. He was the French ambassador to Libya (1985–1989), Morocco (1991–1993), Brazil (1993–1994) and Algeria (1995–1997).

Political offices
Preceded by Paul Dijoud	Minister of State of Monaco; 1997–2000	Succeeded by Patrick Leclercq
