= François-Didier Gregh =

Minister of State of Monaco from 1969 to 1972

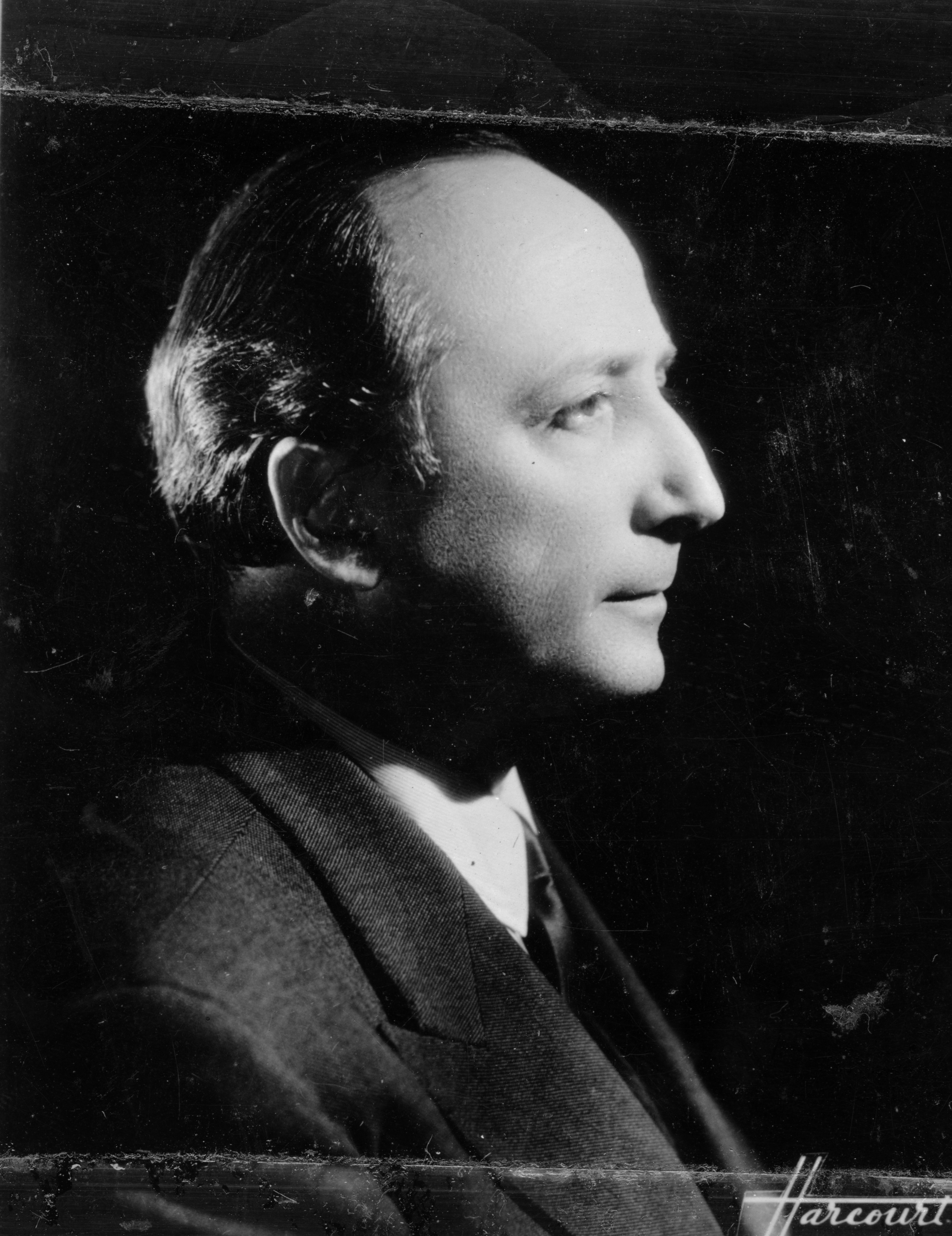

13th Minister of State of Monaco
- In office 1 April 1969 – 24 May 1972
- Monarch: Rainier III
- Preceded by: Paul Demange
- Succeeded by: André Saint-Mleux

Personal details
- Born: 26 March 1906
- Died: 21 October 1992
- Party: Independent
- Parent: Fernand Gregh (father)

François-Didier Gregh (26 March 1906 – 21 October 1992) was a Minister of State for Monaco. He was in office from 1969 to 1972.

He was the son of the French poet Fernand Gregh. He studied at the Sorbonne, and obtained a doctorate of law degree at the Faculté de Droit in Paris in 1928. He started his career at the Ministry of Finance.

Before World War II, he worked in six different ministères, including the Ministry of War with Paul-Boncour, the Presidence of the Council in 1932, the Ministry of the Marine, and the Ministry of Labor from 1933 to 1935. During World War II, he headed the war supply services. He fled to Alger where he was a prominent member of the French Committee of National Liberation (director of internal finance).

From 1945 to 1949, he was the government's director of budget. Starting in 1949, he worked for the loans division of the Crédit Lyonnais.

In February 1953, he became director of operations Asia and Middle East for the International Bank for Reconstruction and Development. He was Deputy Secretary General of NATO, assisting Manlio Brosio on defense matters, from 1955 to 1967.

== Awards and honors ==
=== Monegasque honors ===
- Grand Officer of the Order of Saint Charles

Political offices
Preceded by Paul Demange	Minister of State of Monaco; 1969–1972	Succeeded by André Saint-Mleux
