= Jacques Rueff =

French economist and adviser (1896–1978)

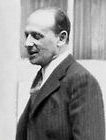

7th Minister of State of Monaco
- In office 12 July 1949 – 1 August 1950
- Monarch: Rainier III
- Preceded by: Pierre Blanchy (acting)
- Succeeded by: Pierre Voizard

Personal details
- Born: Jacques Léon Rueff; 23 August 1896 Paris, France
- Died: 23 April 1978 (aged 81) Paris, France
- Party: Independent

Jacques Léon Rueff (23 August 1896 – 23 April 1978) was a French economist and adviser to the French government.

== Life ==
An influential French conservative and free market thinker, Rueff was born the son of a well known Parisian physician and studied economics and mathematics at the École Polytechnique and Sciences Po. An important economic advisor to President Charles de Gaulle, Rueff was also a major figure in the management of the French economy during the Great Depression. In the early 1930s, he was as a financial attache in London, in charge of the Bank of France's sterling reserves. He also worked as an outside expert for the Economic and Financial Organization of the League of Nations, together with Oskar Morgenstern and Bertil Ohlin, supporting the EFO's work on economic depressions in the late 1930s.

He was a member of the Société d'Économie Politique and was linked to the Éditions de Médicis. He also taught at Sciences Po in the 1930s.

In 1941, Rueff, a Jew, was dismissed from his office as the deputy governor of the Bank of France as a result of Vichy France's new anti-Semitic laws. Rueff published several works of political economy and philosophy during his lifetime, including L'Ordre Social, which appeared shortly after the Liberation of Paris. After the war Rueff became one of the leading French members of the classical liberal Mont Pelerin Society, the president of the Inter-Allied Reparations Agency (IARA), and the minister of state of Monaco. He was strongly in favour of European integration and served from 1952 to 1962 as a judge on the European Court of Justice.

He advised President Charles de Gaulle from 1958. That year, the Rueff Plan, also known as the Rueff-Pinay Plan, balanced the budget and secured the convertibility of the franc, which had been endangered by the strains of decolonisation.

In the 1960s, Rueff became a major proponent of a return to the gold standard and criticised of the use of the dollar as a unit of reserve, which he warned would cause a worldwide inflation. A member of the Académie des Sciences Morales et Politiques, Rueff was elected to the Académie française in 1964. Foreseeing the emerging European Community's Common Market, Rueff recommended cutting barriers to competition in his second report. Along with co-writer Louis Armand and helped by an ad hoc committee of experts, the "plan Rueff-Armand", as the press called it, was published in 1960. The full title of the report is "Rapport du Comité pour la suppression des obstacles à l'expansion économique" (Report on suppressing barriers to economic growth).

Rueff always remained a firm opponent of John Maynard Keynes. His first critique appeared in the Economics Journal, on the issue of transfers; specifically, German war reparations. Rueff was against such transfers in the late 1930s.

In 1947, he critiqued Keynes' magnum opus, The General Theory of Employment, Interest and Money. In 1958, US economist James Tobin became his main critic in the Quarterly Journal of Economics. Almost 30 years later, Rueff, repeated his beliefs in "The End of the Keynesian Era", which was first published in Le Monde.

== Bibliography ==
=== Articles in journals ===
- "L'assurance-chômage, cause du chômage permanent". Revue d'économie politique (in French). XLV. Paris: Librairie du Recueil Sirey: 211–251. January–February 1931.
- Rueff, Jacques (1929). "Les idées de M. Keynes sur le problème des transferts". Revue d'économie politique (in French). XLIII. Paris: Librairie du Recueil Sirey: 1067–1081.
- Rueff, Jacques (May 1947). "The Fallacies of Lord Keynes General Theory". The Quarterly Journal of Economics. LXI (3). Oxford: Oxford University Press: 343–367. doi:10.2307/1879560. JSTOR 1879560.
- Rueff, Jacques (November 1948). "The Fallacies of Lord Keynes' General Theory: Reply". The Quarterly Journal of Economics. LXII (5). Oxford: Oxford University Press: 771–782. doi:10.2307/1883471. JSTOR 1883471.
- Tobin, James (November 1948). "The Fallacies of Lord Keynes' General Theory: Comment". The Quarterly Journal of Economics. LXII (5). Oxford: Oxford University Press: 763–770. doi:10.2307/1883470. JSTOR 1883470.

=== Books ===
- Chivvis, Christopher S. (2010). The Monetary Conservative: Jacques Rueff and 20th Century Free Market Thought. De Kalb: Northern Illinois University Press.
- Rueff, Jacques (1972). The Monetary Sin of the West. Translated by Roger Glémet. New York: The Macmillan Company.
- Rueff, Jacques (1965). The Role and the Rule of Gold. International Finance Section 47. Princeton University.

=== Reports ===
- Rueff, Jacques; Armand, Louis (1960). Premier ministre (ed.). Les obstacles à l'expansion économique (in French). Rapport présenté par le Comité institué par décret n°59-1284 du 13 novembre 1959. Paris.

== See also ==
- List of members of the European Court of Justice

Political offices
Preceded by Pierre Blanchy	Minister of State of Monaco; 1949–1950	Succeeded by Pierre Voizard
