= Paul Demange (politician) =

Minister of State of Monaco from 1966 to 1969

12th Minister of State of Monaco
- In office 28 December 1966 – 1 April 1969
- Monarch: Rainier III
- Preceded by: Jean Reymond
- Succeeded by: François-Didier Gregh

Personal details
- Born: 4 June 1906 Sélestat, France
- Died: 18 April 1970 (aged 63) Paris, France
- Political party: Independent

Paul Demange (French pronunciation: [pɔl dəmɑ̃ʒ]; 4 June 1906 – 18 April 1970) was a Minister of State for Monaco. He served between 1966 and 1969. He was born in 1906 and died in 1970.

Political offices
Preceded by Jean Reymond	Minister of State of Monaco; 1966–1969	Succeeded by François-Didier Gregh
