= André Saint-Mleux =

Minister of State of Monaco from 1972 to 1981

14th Minister of State of Monaco
- In office 24 May 1972 – July 1981
- Monarch: Rainier III
- Preceded by: François-Didier Gregh
- Succeeded by: Jean Herly

Personal details
- Born: 25 September 1920 Saint-Malo, France
- Died: 7 October 2012 (aged 92) Roquebrune-Cap-Martin, France
- Political party: Independent

André Saint-Mleux (25 September 1920 – 7 October 2012) was a Minister of State for Monaco. He was in office from 1972 to 1981. During this time he represented Monaco at the Conference on Security and Co-operation in Europe.

== Biography ==
Mleux graduated from the École nationale d'administration in 1953. He led the majority of his career as French civil servant, before moving to Monaco where he was Minister of State from May 1972 to July 1981. He was also a vice-director of the Société des Bains de Mer de Monaco.

He died in Roquebrune-Cap-Martin on 7 October 2012.

He was married to Danielle Saint-Mleux and had three children.

== Distinctions ==
- Croix de Guerre 1939–1945

Political offices
Preceded by François-Didier Gregh	Minister of State of Monaco; 1972–1981	Succeeded by Jean Herly
