= Lucey, Meurthe-et-Moselle =

Lucey
- Commune
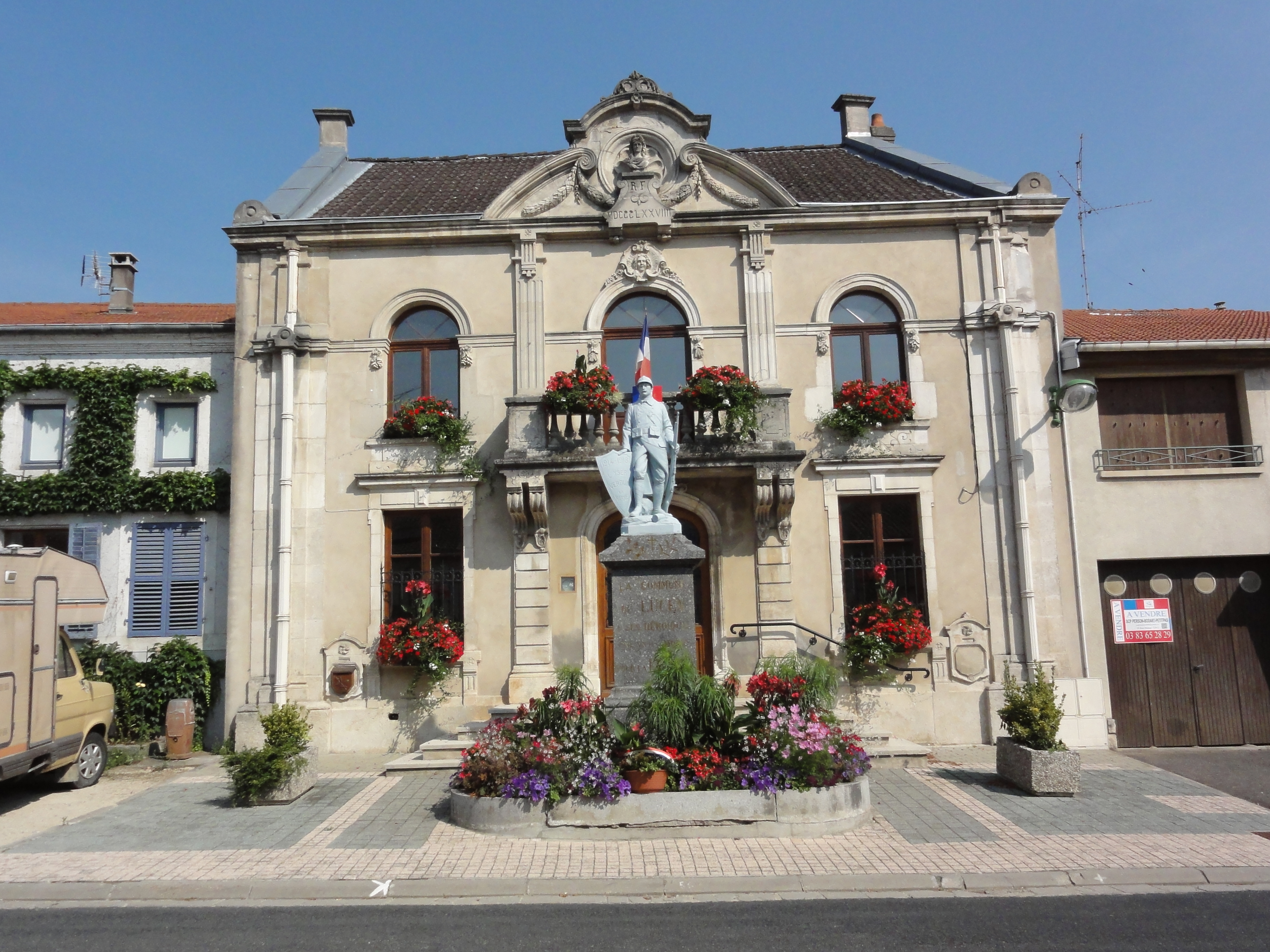
- The town hall and war memorial in Lucey

- Coat of arms
- Location of Lucey
- Location within France Location within Grand Est
- Coordinates: 48°43′20″N 5°50′16″E
- Country: France
- Region: Grand Est
- Department: Meurthe-et-Moselle
- Arrondissement: Toul
- Canton: Le Nord-Toulois
- Intercommunality: Terres Touloises

Government
  - Mayor (2020–2026): Vincent Martin
- Area^{1}: 10.7 km^{2} (4.1 sq mi)
- Elevation: 260 m (850 ft)
- Highest elevation: 395 m (1,296 ft)
- Lowest elevation: 222 m (728 ft)
- Population (2023): 623
  - Density: 58.2/km^{2} (151/sq mi)
- Time zone: UTC+01:00 (CET)
  - Summer (DST): UTC+02:00 (CEST)
- INSEE/Postal code: 54327 /54200
- ^{1} French Land Register data, which excludes lakes, ponds, glaciers > 1 km^{2} (0.386 sq mi or 247 acres) and river estuaries.

Lucey (French pronunciation: [lysɛ]) is a commune in the Meurthe-et-Moselle department in north-eastern France.

== See also ==
- Communes of the Meurthe-et-Moselle department
- Parc naturel régional de Lorraine
