= Minister of State (Monaco) =

Head of government

Minister of State of the Principality of Monaco
- Ministre d'État (French); Ministru de Statu (Monégasque)
- Coat of arms of Monaco

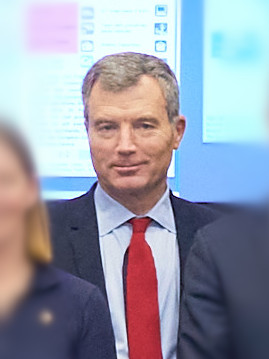
- Incumbent; Christophe Mirmand since 21 July 2025
- Member of: Council of Government
- Appointer: Prince of Monaco
- Formation: February 1911; 115 years ago
- First holder: Émile Flach
- Salary: €180,000 annually

The minister of state (French: Ministre d'État; Monégasque: Ministru de Statu) is the head of government of Monaco, appointed by and subordinate to the Prince of Monaco, following a proposal by the Government of France.

During their term of office, the officeholder is responsible for directing the work of the government and in charge of foreign relations. As the monarch's representative, the prime minister also presides (with voting powers) over the Council of Government, directs the executive services and commands the police and military.

== History of the office ==
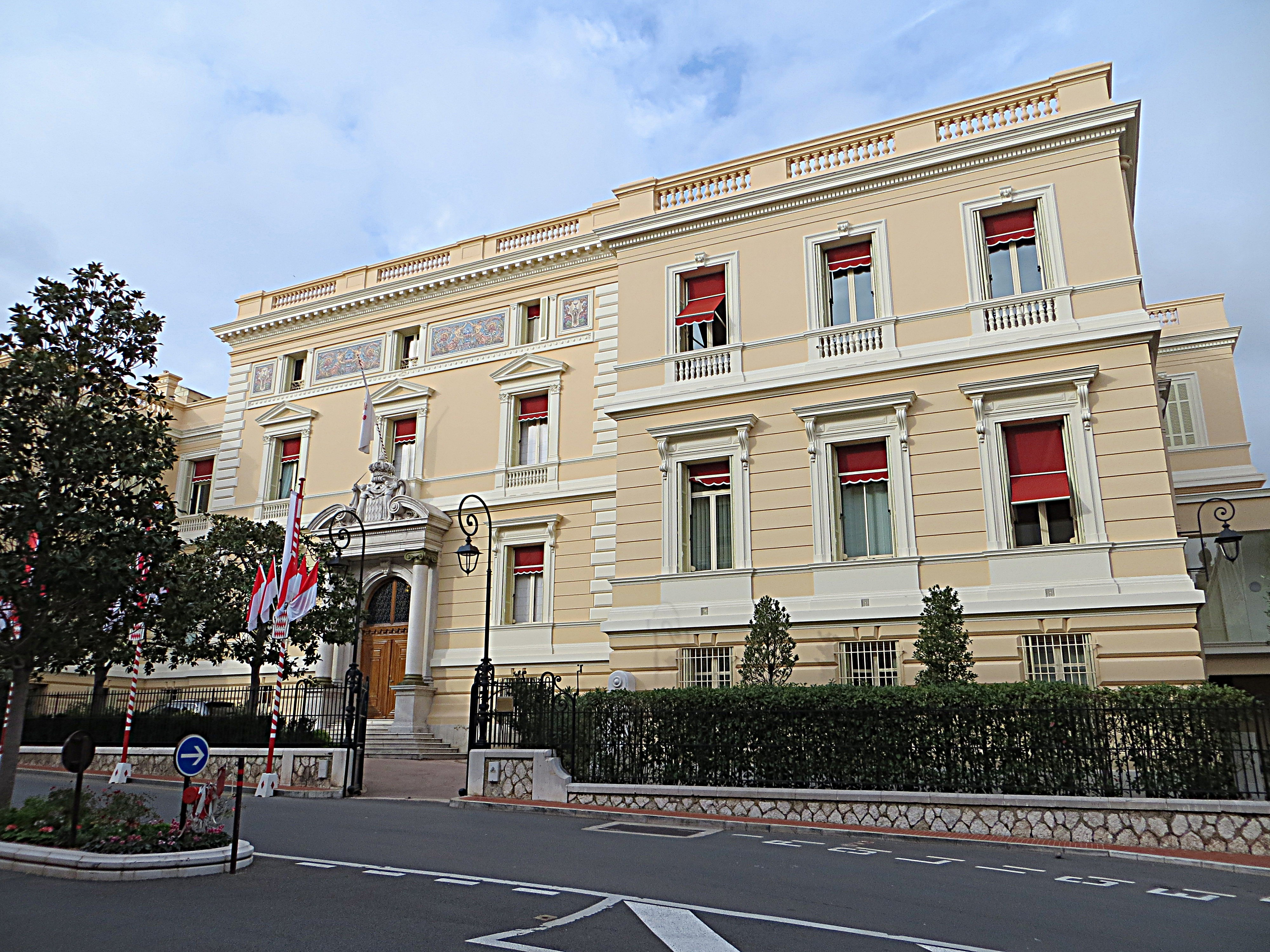
The Government House, official residence of the prime minister

The office was created in 1911 with the adoption of Monaco's constitution. Until the 2002 constitutional revision, the minister of state had to be a French citizen, selected from several senior civil servants proposed by the Government of France. Since 2002, the prime minister can be either French or Monégasque and is chosen and appointed by the monarch, after consultation with the Government of France. It remains the Government of France's prerogative to propose an appointee.

== List of officeholders ==
No.	Portrait	Name (Birth–Death)	Term of office			Political party	Prince (Reign)
No.	Portrait	Name (Birth–Death)	Took office	Left office	Time in office	Political party	Prince (Reign)
1		Émile Flach (1853–1926)	February 1911	December 1917	6 years, 10 months	Independent	Albert I (1889–1922)
—		Georges Jaloustre (1875–1951) acting	January 1918	February 1919	1 year, 1 month	Independent	Albert I (1889–1922)
2		Raymond Le Bourdon (1861–1937)	19 February 1919	11 August 1923	4 years, 173 days	Independent	Albert I (1889–1922)
2		Raymond Le Bourdon (1861–1937)	19 February 1919	11 August 1923	4 years, 173 days	Independent	Louis II (1922–1949)
3		Maurice Piette (1871–1953)	11 August 1923	February 1932	8 years, 5 months	Independent	Louis II (1922–1949)
—		Henry Mauran (1899–1983) acting	January 1932	June 1932	4 months	Independent	Louis II (1922–1949)
4		Maurice Bouilloux-Lafont (1875–1937)	June 1932	June 1937	5 years	Independent	Louis II (1922–1949)
—		Henry Mauran (1899–1983) acting	June 1937	August 1937	2 months	Independent	Louis II (1922–1949)
5		Émile Roblot (1886–1963)	15 September 1937	29 September 1944	7 years, 14 days	Independent	Louis II (1922–1949)
—		Pierre Blanchy (1897–1981) acting	29 September 1944	13 October 1944	14 days	Independent	Louis II (1922–1949)
6		Pierre de Witasse (1878–1956)	13 October 1944	December 1948	4 years, 1 month	Independent	Louis II (1922–1949)
—		Pierre Blanchy (1897–1981) acting	4 January 1949	12 July 1949	189 days	Independent	Louis II (1922–1949)
—		Pierre Blanchy (1897–1981) acting	4 January 1949	12 July 1949	189 days	Independent	Rainier III (1949–2005)
7		Jacques Rueff (1896–1978)	12 July 1949	1 August 1950	1 year, 20 days	Independent	Rainier III (1949–2005)
8		Pierre Voizard (1896–1982)	1 August 1950	2 September 1953	3 years, 32 days	Independent	Rainier III (1949–2005)
9		Henry Soum (1899–1983)	15 November 1953	12 February 1959	5 years, 89 days	Independent	Rainier III (1949–2005)
10		Émile Pelletier (1898–1975)	12 February 1959	23 January 1962	2 years, 345 days	Independent	Rainier III (1949–2005)
—		Pierre Blanchy (1897–1981) acting	23 January 1962	16 August 1963	1 year, 205 days	Independent	Rainier III (1949–2005)
11		Jean Reymond (1912–1992)	16 August 1963	28 December 1966	3 years, 134 days	Independent	Rainier III (1949–2005)
12		Paul Demange (1906–1970)	28 December 1966	1 April 1969	2 years, 94 days	Independent	Rainier III (1949–2005)
13		François-Didier Gregh (1906–1992)	1 April 1969	24 May 1972	3 years, 53 days	Independent	Rainier III (1949–2005)
14		André Saint-Mleux (1920–2012)	24 May 1972	July 1981	9 years, 1 month	Independent	Rainier III (1949–2005)
15		Jean Herly (1920–1998)	July 1981	16 September 1985	4 years, 2 months	Independent	Rainier III (1949–2005)
16		Jean Ausseil (1925–2001)	16 September 1985	16 February 1991	5 years, 153 days	Independent	Rainier III (1949–2005)
17		Jacques Dupont (1929–2002)	16 February 1991	2 December 1994	3 years, 77 days	Independent	Rainier III (1949–2005)
18		Paul Dijoud (born 1938)	2 December 1994	3 February 1997	2 years, 63 days	Independent	Rainier III (1949–2005)
19		Michel Lévêque (born 1933)	3 February 1997	5 January 2000	2 years, 336 days	Independent	Rainier III (1949–2005)
20		Patrick Leclercq (born 1938)	5 January 2000	1 May 2005	5 years, 116 days	Independent	Rainier III (1949–2005)
20		Patrick Leclercq (born 1938)	5 January 2000	1 May 2005	5 years, 116 days	Independent	Albert II (2005–present)
21		Jean-Paul Proust (1940–2010)	1 May 2005	29 March 2010	4 years, 332 days	Independent	Albert II (2005–present)
22		Michel Roger (born 1949)	29 March 2010	16 December 2015	5 years, 262 days	Independent	Albert II (2005–present)
—		Gilles Tonelli (born 1957) acting	16 December 2015	1 February 2016	47 days	Independent	Albert II (2005–present)
23		Serge Telle (born 1955)	1 February 2016	31 August 2020	4 years, 212 days	Independent	Albert II (2005–present)
24		Pierre Dartout (born 1954)	1 September 2020	2 September 2024	4 years, 2 days	Independent	Albert II (2005–present)
25		Didier Guillaume (1959–2025)	2 September 2024	17 January 2025	137 days	Independent	Albert II (2005–present)
—		Isabelle Berro-Amadeï (born 1965) acting	10 January 2025	21 July 2025	192 days	Independent	Albert II (2005–present)
26		Christophe Mirmand (born 1961)	21 July 2025	Incumbent	1 year, 70 days	Independent	Albert II (2005–present)

== See also ==
- Politics of Monaco
- Monarchy of Monaco
  - List of rulers of Monaco
