= Jacques Dupont (politician) =

Minister of State of Monaco from 1991 to 1994

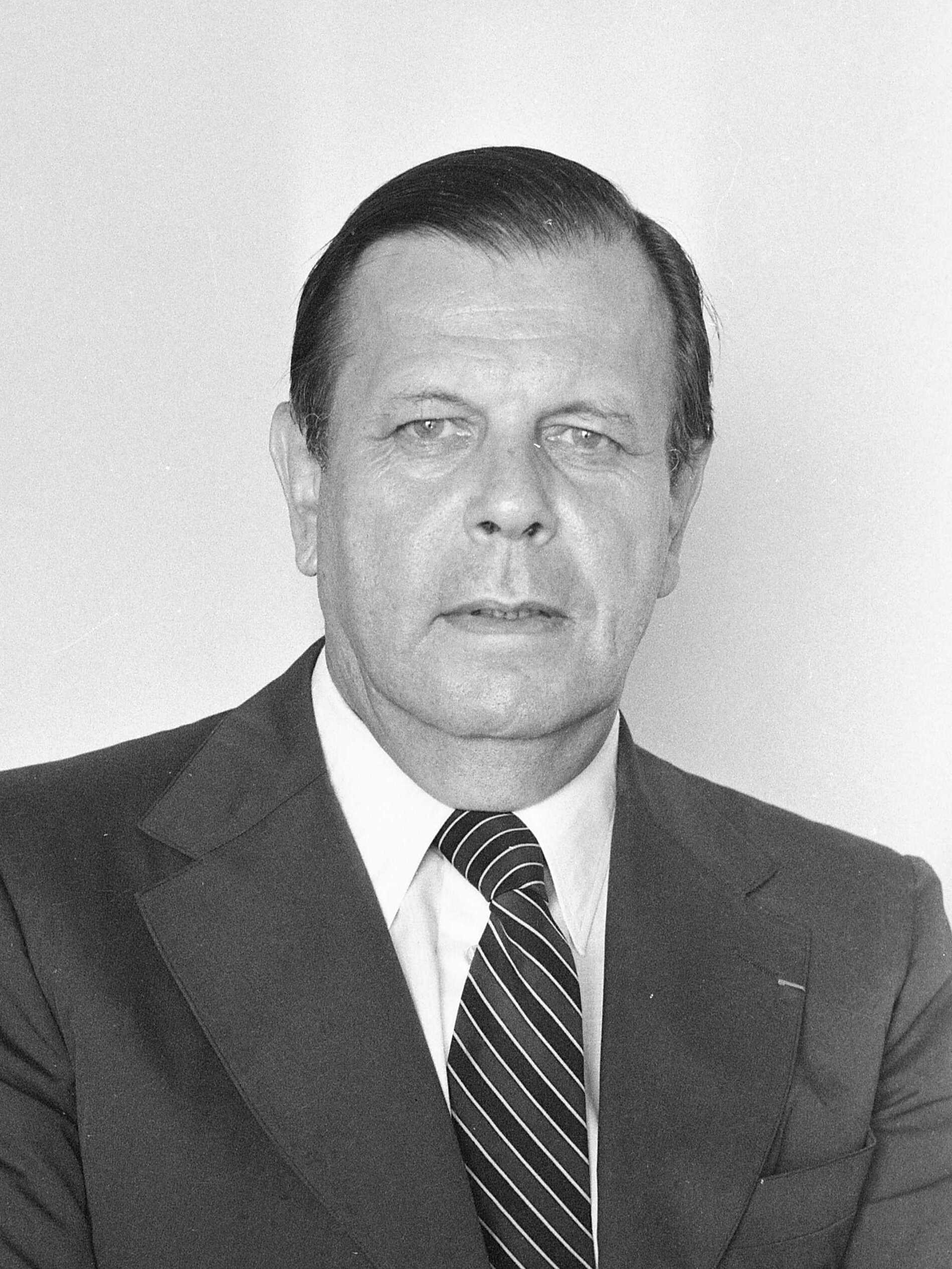
- Dupont in 1982

17th Minister of State of Monaco
- In office 16 February 1991 – 2 December 1994
- Monarch: Rainier III
- Preceded by: Jean Ausseil
- Succeeded by: Paul Dijoud

Personal details
- Born: 22 October 1929 Troyes, Aube, France
- Died: 9 November 2002 (aged 73) Paris, France
- Party: Independent

Jacques Dupont (French pronunciation: [ʒak dypɔ̃]; 22 October 1929 – 9 November 2002) was Minister of State of Monaco from 1991 to 1994. He previously served as French ambassador to Israel from 1982 to 1986 and South Africa from 1988 to 1991.

Dupont is said to be the first foreign ambassador to have met with Nelson Mandela after his historic release.

Political offices
Preceded by Jean Ausseil	Minister of State of Monaco; 1991–1994	Succeeded by Paul Dijoud
