= Invasion and occupation of Monaco during World War II =

Occupied Monaco by Axis powers Monaco occupé (French) Monaco occupato (Italian) Besetztes Monaco (German)
- 1942–1944
- Flag Coat of arms

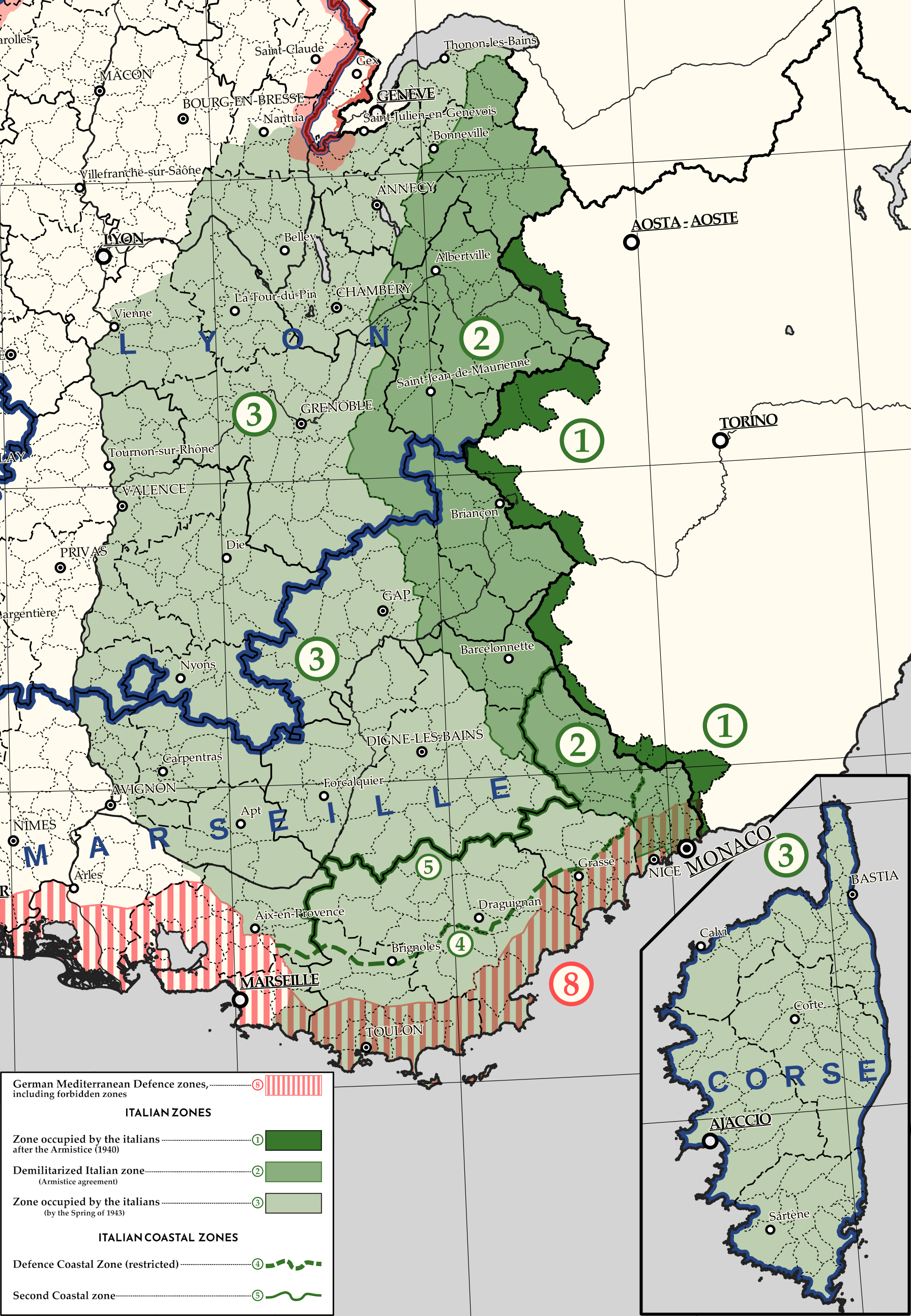
- Map of the Italian occupation of Monaco and France
- Status: Occupied state by Axis powers
- Capital: Monaco
- Official languages: Italian (1942-1943) German (1943-1944)
- Common languages: French, Monégasque and Ligurian
- Religion: Catholic

Government
  - King: Victor Emmanuel III (1942-1943)
  - Chancellor: Adolf Hitler (1943-1944)
- Prime Minister (Duce)
  - 1942-1943: Benito Mussolini
- History
  - Established: 1942
  - Italian Occupation: 11 November 1942
  - German Occupation: 9 September 1943
  - Liberation by the United States: 3 September 1944
  - Disestablished: 1944
Preceded by	Succeeded by
Monaco	Monaco
- Today part of: Monaco

The invasion and occupation of Monaco refers to the presence of the Italian and German forces between 1942 and 1944 in the territory of Monaco and the control they exerted within the territory.

In late 1942, the Italian army invaded the principality for strategic purposes, in part because the Allies were gaining ground in North Africa. Just under a year later, German forces occupied Monaco after Italy fell into civil war. Despite Hitler's interest in Monaco's neutrality, which greatly benefited Nazi economic strategies, 90 Jews were deported, with most dying in concentration camps.

== Pre-war Monaco ==
After the end of the First World War, the Principality of Monaco was under French military protection in accordance with the Franco-Monégasque Treaty, signed in July 1918.

In the 1930s, Monaco was already known for its lavishness, with the Monte Carlo Casino and automobile racing attracting visitors from around the world. Monaco enjoyed relative prosperity in the pre-war period, even though there was some instability due to the rule of Prince Louis II.

== World War II ==
=== Pre-occupation ===
Monaco was a neutral state during World War II, but its function and position were fiercely disputed by Germany and Italy, which had conflicting opinions and ideas about its future. Germany coveted Monaco's neutrality because its flexible regulations and tax system allowed the Nazi regime to trade with the rest of the world through figurehead enterprises it established in the principality. With access to a neutral country, Germany could obtain foreign currency, which was necessary for carrying out ambitious military projects and war-related activities.

800 inhabitants were mobilized when the war started in 1939, along with 300 French soldiers. In June 1940, Italy declared war against France. This served as a warning to Monegasque leaders, who closed the casino and arrested Mussolini’s supporters.

In 1941, tensions between Fascist Italians and the French in Monaco rose, with the principality becoming a hotspot for these tensions due to its geography and demographics. An example of this is a spreading parody of La Marseillaise, mocking Italians titled Allez, Enfants de l’Italie (“Let's go, Children of Italy”). Violent interactions also occurred, with the murder of Pierre Weck in October 1940 causing anger amongst the French community. Weck was a young Frenchman who was walking with his friends at night when he crossed paths with two Italians singing "Viva Mussolini, vive il Duce". When Weck asked them to stop, the Italians responded violently, leading to his death two days later. The autopsy report indicated the cause of death was hitting the pavement, thus leaving the two Italians free of charges, despite protests by the French population.

Although Monaco accepted that French defence installations would be established along the coast in the pre-war period, Prince Louis had always declared his intention for Monaco to remain neutral if war was to erupt. While neutrality was indeed officially promoted up to November 1942, Monaco became involved in a number of financial agreements with Germany, which meant that the Nazis accepted Monaco's claims of independence. The Germans notably wanted to control the Société des Bains de Mers et des étrangers (SBM), which was particularly powerful in Monaco as the owner of the casino. The German presence in the principality's industries then extended to other domains, notably for the production of German propaganda and the purchase of armaments by the Germans on the open market.

Food supplies were particularly abundant in the principality compared to the rest of occupied Europe, notably for those involved in war profiteering who came to Monaco to avoid taxes. Monte Carlo was known for maintaining its entertainment scene during the war. This wealth and abundance of supplies, however, did not apply to the whole population, as rationing and increasing prices took place in other regions.

Monaco's geographic location was crucial to Italy's strategic goals. Mussolini deployed his forces to take Monaco in June 1940, shortly after Italy declared war on France, in order to control the port of Monte Carlo and gain territorial advantage. By early 1942, Monaco's port was controlled by the Italian Armistice Commission. Monaco attempted to make a deal with Switzerland to escape Italy's control, but discussions were unsuccessful.

=== Italian invasion and occupation (11 November 1942 – 9 September 1943) ===
The neutral status of Monaco meant that Italy could not invade the principality unless attacked by Monaco. The Italians thus made the claim that the French defence installations on the coast were proof of Monaco's non-neutrality, and invaded the principality on 11 November. Some scholars point to the establishment of a US consulate in Monaco on 5 November, as an explanation for the timing of the invasion. Walter Orebaugh, the new consul, was in contact with the French Resistance when he was consul in Nice, and Mussolini's regime saw the new US-Monegasque diplomatic relations as a threat to its influence in Monaco. The US consulate was the first target of the Italian forces on 16 November, after access by sea or land had been closed. In the days of the invasion, Prince Louis sent letters to Pope Pius XII and Hitler about the violation of Monaco's sovereignty. After this event, imprisoned irredentists were freed by Italian forces and arrests and internments of anti-fascists began. British men were the primary targets of the arrests, although most had already left at the start of the war.

A puppet state was established in Monaco, but the wealthy residents of Monte Carlo maintained their luxurious lifestyle, with the casino staying open.

As the Allies gained ground in North Africa and Italy, foreigners and black market activities became new targets of Italian repression.

=== German occupation (9 September 1943 – 3 September 1944) ===
Mussolini was arrested in July 1943. Italy switched sides and joined the Allies, signing the Armistice of Cassibile on 3 September. Italian forces left Monaco on 9 September, and the next day the Nazis took over, establishing their headquarters in the Hôtel de Paris. Prince Louis, wanting to maintain his status, welcomed the Germans and used his German roots as leverage.

This led to special treatment of Monaco by Germany, and enabled Germany to put in place many of the projects developed earlier in the war, using Monaco's alleged neutrality for financial purposes. They created more than three hundred holding companies and engaged in money laundering. A bank was established in the summer of 1944 by the Germans, who sought to bypass the American economic embargo. Fraudulent businesses became abundant in the principality.

During this period, Monegasque authorities worked with the Gestapo to eliminate members of the resistance and anti-fascists. Minister of State Émile Roblot argued that Germany had threatened to end Monaco's special treatment unless it cooperated.

After the bombing of the Antheor rail viaduct by Allied forces, food supplies transported by train were stopped until the end of the war, leading to malnutrition. Water and bread supplies were interrupted by later bombings. Bombing continued until 2-3 September, when the Germans left Monaco. American troops then started to arrive. 3 September is a national holiday in Monaco, commemorating the country's liberation.

Throughout World War II, Prince Louis II kept Roblot as his Minister of State despite his affiliations with pro-fascist individuals and demands by the Monegasque and French populations to dismiss him. Roblot played an important role in the positions taken by Monaco as a consequence of the Italian and German occupations. After the Germans left Monaco, Roblot banned pro-Allied demonstrations. On his return to Monaco, Prince Rainier was alarmed by the actions undertaken during and after the occupation, and went to see his grandfather to request Roblot's dismissal. Prince Louis refused, but Roblot stood down in 1945 after popular demonstrations.

As decided by Monegasque leaders, no war trials were conducted in the principality in the aftermath of World War II.

=== Liberation (3 September 1944) ===
Monaco was liberated on 3 September 1944 by American forces and the Maquis after several days of clashes with the Germans and naval artillery fire from the French Navy on the heights of Beausoleil, La Turbie, and Fort d’Angel. At the time of the liberation, the purge was severe, as reported by Raymond Aubrac, Commissioner of the Republic for the Southeast. Louis II feared being deposed in favour of his son.

In 1944, the Italian partisan forces accompanying the Allies, which liberated the principality on 6 September of the same year, advised Raymond Aubrac to annex the principality to France. Charles de Gaulle refused but made it clear that, should annexation take place, he had to be informed.

The Minister of State, a position equivalent to that of head of government, Émile Roblot whose role during the occupation was judged ambiguous was forced to leave office a few weeks after the liberation.

On 28 September 1944, the hereditary prince joined the French colonial troops in Algeria and took part in the operations for the liberation of Alsace. He was decorated with the Croix de Guerre and the American Bronze Star Medal. In 1947, he was appointed a Knight of the Legion of Honour.

=== Deportation of Jews ===
When Mussolini's forces arrived in Monaco, they established a fascist political bureau. Its aim was to identify and arrest Monegasques and French residents involved with the Resistance. Despite this, the Resistance still operated, hiding Jewish people and smuggling them to Switzerland. Prince Louis made Mussolini promise that the Jewish population in Monaco would not be deported. However, the prince did not intervene when Jewish-Romanian Raoul Gunsbourg, the longtime director of the Opéra de Monte-Carlo, was forced to resign and had to flee to Switzerland to avoid arrest.

Although neither Mussolini nor Hitler attempted to establish a fascist regime in Monaco, under the pressure of the latter, several people were deported to concentration camps. During the occupation, the Jewish population of Monaco, estimated by consul Hellenthal to be between 1,000 and 1,500, was targeted by the German authorities, who arrested them and sent them to occupied territories in France for internment. According to a government assessment, roughly 90 people, who were rounded up by Monegasque police officers, under pressure from Vichy France authorities, were deported from Monaco during the night of 1 August, 1942, with only nine surviving. Among the deportees was René Blum, the founder of the opera house, who was murdered in Auschwitz. Seventy-three years later, Prince Albert II of Monaco publicly apologized for the Holocaust deportation of 90 Jews and acknowledged Prince Louis II's failure to maintain Monaco's neutrality during the war.

On 27 August, 2015, Prince Albert II of Monaco unveiled a monument dedicated to the Jewish people who had been deported. The monument had the Jewish people's names carved into the memorial. It was chosen to be unveiled 73 years after the night the Jews were deported.

== See also ==
- Military history of Italy during World War II
