= Maurice Piette =

Minister of State of Monaco from 1923 to 1932

3rd Minister of State of Monaco
- In office 11 August 1923 – January 1932
- Monarch: Louis II
- Preceded by: Raymond Le Bourdon
- Succeeded by: Henry Mauran (acting); Émile Roblot

Personal details
- Born: 16 May 1871
- Died: 5 July 1953 (aged 82)
- Party: Independent

Maurice Piette (French pronunciation: [mɔʁis pjɛt]; 16 May 1871 – 5 July 1953) was an ex-minister of state for Monaco. He served between 1923 and 1932. He was born in 1871 and died in 1953.

Political offices
Preceded by Raymond Le Bourdon	Minister of State of Monaco; 1923–1932	Succeeded by Henry Mauran
