= Pierreval =

- Commune
- Location of Pierreval
- Location within France Location within Normandy
- Coordinates: 49°32′36″N 1°15′26″E
- Country: France
- Region: Normandy
- Department: Seine-Maritime
- Arrondissement: Rouen
- Canton: Le Mesnil-Esnard

Government
  - Mayor (2026–32): Sabrina Hubert
- Area^{1}: 3.88 km^{2} (1.50 sq mi)
- Elevation: 169 m (554 ft)
- Highest elevation: 181 m (594 ft)
- Lowest elevation: 123 m (404 ft)
- Population (2023): 524
  - Density: 135/km^{2} (350/sq mi)
- Time zone: UTC+01:00 (CET)
  - Summer (DST): UTC+02:00 (CEST)
- INSEE/Postal code: 76502 /76750
- ^{1} French Land Register data, which excludes lakes, ponds, glaciers > 1 km^{2} (0.386 sq mi or 247 acres) and river estuaries.

Pierreval (French pronunciation: [pjɛʁval]) is a commune in the Seine-Maritime department in the Normandy region in northern France.

== Geography ==
A small farming village situated some 12 miles (19 km) northeast of Rouen at the junction of the D15 and the D122 roads. The A28 autoroute forms the northwest border of the commune.

== Population ==
Historical population
Year	Pop.	±% p.a.
1968	135	—
1975	154	+1.90%
1982	348	+12.35%
1990	358	+0.35%
1999	328	−0.97%
2007	444	+3.86%
2012	461	+0.75%
2017	555	+3.78%
2023	524	−0.95%
Source: INSEE

== Places of interest ==
- The church of St.Martin, dating from the thirteenth century.

== People ==
- Marie Juliette Louvet, grandmother of prince Rainier III of Monaco, was born here in 1867.

== See also ==
- Communes of the Seine-Maritime department
