= Princess Charlotte, Duchess of Valentinois =

Hereditary Princess of Monaco (1898–1977)

Charlotte
- Hereditary Princess of Monaco; Duchess of Valentinois
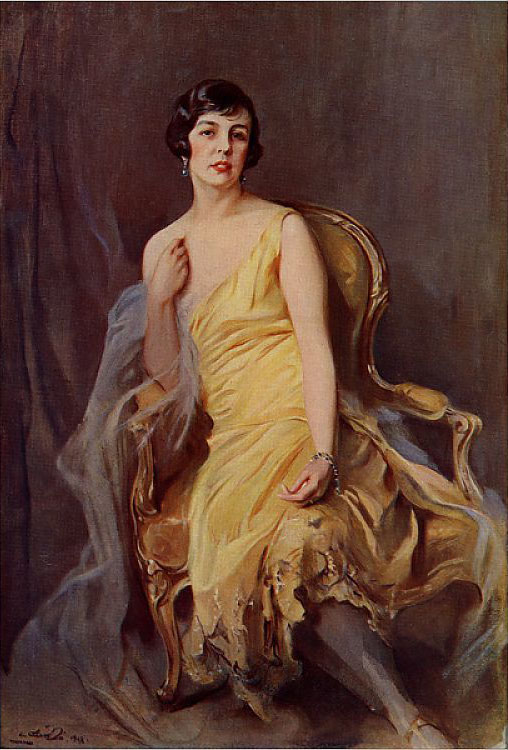
- Portrait, 1928
- Born: 30 September 1898; Constantine, French Algeria
- Died: 16 November 1977 (aged 79); Paris, France
- Burial: Chapel of Peace, Monaco
- Spouse: Prince Pierre, Duke of Valentinois (m. 1920; div. 1933)
- Issue: Princess Antoinette, Baroness of Massy; Rainier III, Prince of Monaco
Names
- Charlotte Louise Juliette Grimaldi
- House: Grimaldi
- Father: Louis II, Prince of Monaco
- Mother: Marie Juliette Louvet

Princess Charlotte, Duchess of Valentinois (Charlotte Louise Juliette Grimaldi; 30 September 1898 – 16 November 1977), styled Hereditary Princess of Monaco between 1922 and 1944, was the daughter of Louis II, Prince of Monaco, and mother of Prince Rainier III. From 1922 until 1944, she was the Hereditary Princess of Monaco, heiress presumptive to the throne.

== Birth and adoption ==
Born Charlotte Louise Juliette de Monaco in Constantine, French Algeria, she was the illegitimate daughter of Marie Juliette Louvet, a cabaret singer, and Louis, Hereditary Prince of Monaco and Duke of Valentinois, son and heir of Monaco's reigning monarch, Prince Albert I. Louis had no legitimate children or siblings, so even before he succeeded his father as Prince Louis II, the principality sought to forestall a succession crisis, anticipating that its neighbour, the French Republic, might take it amiss if the throne fell someday to Louis' legal next of kin. That heir was his cousin, Wilhelm, 2nd Duke of Urach, who, although born and raised in Monte Carlo as the son of Princess Florestine of Monaco, was a German subject, property owner and patrilineal relative of the kings of Württemberg. On 15 May 1911, a law was passed recognising Charlotte as Louis' daughter, and declaring her to be a dynastic member of the sovereign family. Though this act was later held to be invalid under the 1882 statutes, an Ordinance of 30 October 1918 was passed to allow her to be adopted into the dynasty instead. Louis adopted Charlotte in Paris on 16 May 1919, thereby entitling her to the surname Grimaldi, while her grandfather bestowed upon her the traditional title of the Principality's heir, Duchess of Valentinois, for life. Charlotte became heir presumptive to the throne as Hereditary Princess when her grandfather died and her father inherited the princely crown in 1922.

== Legality of adoption ==
A shadow of doubt existed over the legality of this adoption. The Monegasque Civil Code (Articles 240 and 243) required that the adopting party be at least of age 50 and the adoptee 21. The 1918 Ordinance changed the age limit to 18 (Charlotte was twenty at the time) but not the other age limit; Louis was then only 48.

== Marriage ==
In Monaco, civilly on 18 March and religiously on 19 March 1920, Louis arranged Charlotte's marriage to the then Count Pierre de Polignac of Hennebont, Morbihan, Brittany, France, who, by the Prince's ordinance, took the surname Grimaldi and became a prince of the Monegasque princely family. The couple had two children:

- Princess Antoinette Louise Alberte Suzanne (28 December 1920 – 18 March 2011).
- Rainier III, Prince of Monaco (31 May 1923 – 6 April 2005).

Their marriage was not, however, a happy one; they separated on 20 March 1930 due to his homosexuality, and Charlotte left him to live with her doctor and Italian lover, Dalmazzo. The couple were divorced on 18 February 1933 by ordinance of Prince Louis II.

== Later life ==
On 30 May 1944, the day before her son's 21st birthday and in full agreement with her father, Charlotte renounced and ceded her rights to the throne to her son Rainier, subject to the stipulation that he not predecease her. From this date, she was no longer Hereditary Princess of Monaco, though she retained the title Princess Charlotte of Monaco.

Late in life she went to college, obtaining a degree in social work. After her son assumed the throne (in 1949), Princess Charlotte moved to live at Château de Marchais, the Grimaldi estate outside Paris. Despite the objections of her children who feared for her safety, she turned the estate into a rehabilitation centre for ex-convicts. She lived at the estate with her lover, a noted French former jewel thief named René Girier and nicknamed "René la Canne" (René the Cane).

She died on 16 November 1977 in Paris.

== Titles and styles ==
- 30 September 1898 – 18 July 1911: Charlotte Louise Juliette de Monaco
- 18 July 1911 – 15 November 1911: Charlotte Louise Juliette Grimaldi de Monaco
- 15 November 1911 – 16 May 1919: Charlotte Louise Juliette Grimaldi de Monaco, Mademoiselle de Valentinois
- 16 May 1919 – 1 August 1922: Her Serene Highness The Duchess of Valentinois
- 1 August 1922 – 30 May 1944: Her Serene Highness The Hereditary Princess of Monaco
- 30 May 1944 – 15 November 1977: Her Serene Highness Princess Charlotte of Monaco

== Ancestry ==
Ancestors of Princess Charlotte, Duchess of Valentinois

8. Charles III, Prince of Monaco
4. Albert I, Prince of Monaco
9. Countess Antoinette de Merode
2. Louis II, Prince of Monaco
10. William Douglas-Hamilton, 11th Duke of Hamilton
5. Lady Mary Douglas-Hamilton
11. Princess Marie of Baden
1. Princess Charlotte, Duchess of Valentinois
12. Jacques Antoine Louvet
6. Jacques Henri Louvet
13. Marie Catherine Jouanne
3. Marie Juliette Louvet
14. Pierre Piedefer
7. Joséphine Elmire Piedefer
15. Marie Anne Brunel

Princess Charlotte, Duchess of Valentinois House of Grimaldi Born: 30 September 1898 Died: 16 November 1977
Monegasque royalty
Preceded by Louis	Hereditary Princess of Monaco; 1922–1944	Succeeded by Rainier
Preceded by Albert	Duchess of Valentinois¹ (de facto); 1919–1977	Succeeded by Rainier
Notes and references
1. Title extinct in 1949.
