= Henry Mauran =

Acting Minister of State of Monaco in 1932 and 1937

Acting Minister of State of Monaco
- In office June 1937 – August 1937
- Monarch: Louis II
- Preceded by: Maurice Bouilloux-Lafont
- Succeeded by: Emile Roblot
- In office January 1932 – June 1932
- Monarch: Louis II
- Preceded by: Maurice Piette
- Succeeded by: Maurice Bouilloux-Lafont

Personal details
- Born: 1899
- Died: 1983 (aged 83–84)
- Political party: Independent

Henry Mauran was an acting Minister of State for Monaco on two occasions. The first term was between January 1932 and June 1932, while the second term was between June 1937 and August 1937.

Political offices
Preceded by Maurice Piette	Minister of State of Monaco; 1932–1932	Succeeded by Maurice Bouilloux-Lafont

Political offices
Preceded by Maurice Bouilloux-Lafont	Minister of State of Monaco; 1937–1937	Succeeded by Emile Roblot
