= Marie Juliette Louvet =

Lover of Prince Louise II of Monaco (1867–1930)

- Born: 9 May 1867; Pierreval, France
- Died: 24 September 1930 (aged 63); Paris, France
- Spouse: Achille Delmaet (m. 1885; div. 1893)
- Children: 3, including Princess Charlotte, Duchess of Valentinois

Marie Juliette Louvet (9 May 1867 – 24 September 1930) was the lover of the unmarried Prince Louis II of Monaco and the mother of his only child, Princess Charlotte of Monaco.

Known as Juliette, Louvet was the daughter of Jacques Henri Louvet (Pierreval, 10 September 1830 – Rouen, 7 September 1910) and his first wife (m. La Rue-Saint-Pierre, 3 February 1852), Joséphine Elmire Piedefer (La Rue-Saint-Pierre, 3 September 1828 – Pierreval, 10 July 1871).

She married the photographer Achille Delmaet on 6 October 1885 (his best known photographs are nudes of La Goulue, a cancan dancer of the Moulin Rouge), but they divorced on 14 January 1893. They had two children, Georges (1884–1955) and Marguerite (1886–1894). Juliette Delmaet became an entertainer of sorts, reportedly a cabaret singer. In 1897, she was a hostess in a Montmartre nightclub when she met Prince Louis of Monaco. She gave birth to their daughter, Charlotte, in Constantine, French Algeria, on 30 September 1898, where Louis served in the French Army with a regiment of Chasseurs d'Afrique (African Light Horse), and where she justified her presence at the military barracks as a laundress and a dressmaker. Through her daughter, she is the maternal grandmother of Rainier III, Prince of Monaco and Princess Antoinette, Baroness of Massy.
