= Societé Monégasque de Banques et de Métaux Précieux =

Societé Monégasque de Banques et de Métaux Précieux was a Monaco bank which failed in 1955. The failure of the bank led to the resignation of Monaco's cabinet.

== History ==
The failure of the bank was due to its investments in the media company Images et Son, that had been founded by the Irish businessman Charles Michelson. Michelson's Images et Son had been founded after he had been granted the rights to shortwave radio and television in Monaco by the French government as the result of a financial settlement in 1949. In turn, Michelson granted his own rights to Rainier III, Prince of Monaco, while he kept a financial stake in the company. In 1955, the French government withdraw the rights from Michelson, and the resulting collapse in the share price of Images et Son on the Paris stock exchange caused problems for the bank who had invested heavily in the company. The Societé Monégasque de Banques et de Métaux Précieux had traditionally favoured a more diverse investment portfolio, but had instead concentrated their investments in Image et Son.
