= Émile Roblot =

Minister of State of Monaco from 1937 to 1944

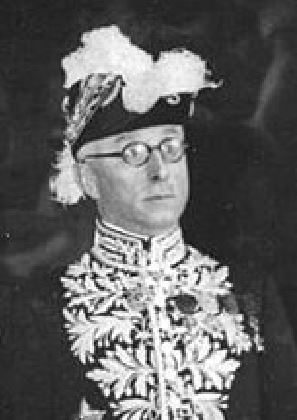
- Roblot in 1935

5th Minister of State of Monaco
- In office 10 August 1937 – 29 September 1944
- Monarch: Louis II
- Preceded by: Henry Mauran (acting)
- Succeeded by: Pierre Blanchy

Personal details
- Born: 15 February 1886 France
- Died: 24 August 1963 (aged 77)
- Party: Independent
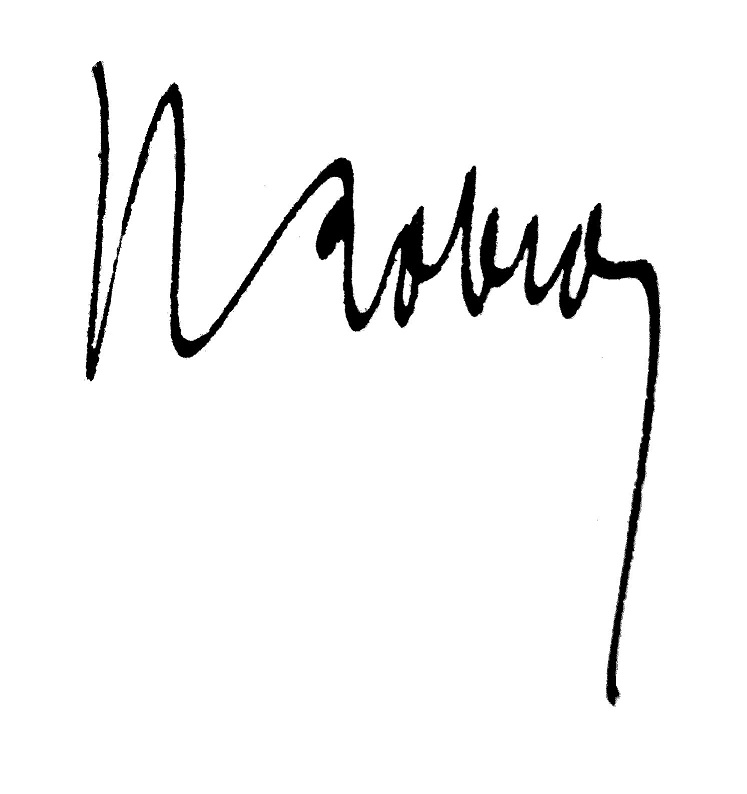
- Signature

Émile Henri Roblot (French pronunciation: [emil ɑ̃ʁi ʁɔblo]; 15 February 1886 – 24 August 1963) was a French civil servant who served as the Minister of State of Monaco from 1937 to 1944.

== Early life and career ==
Roblot was born on 15 February 1886. He studied law in Dijon where he received a doctorate in 1912 and published a doctoral thesis.

He was a prefect for the French departements of and Meurthe-et-Moselle from 1931 to 1935 Bas-Rhin from 1935 to 1937.

== Minister of State of Monaco ==
Roblot was appointed Minister of State of Monaco by Louis II, Prince of Monaco on 10 August 1937.

Shortly before the start of World War II, Monaco declared its neutrality. Once the war started, 800 people were mobilized in the country. Due to its demographics, which included both Italian and French people, the different sections of the population supported different sides of the conflict. Roblot had strong ties to Vichy France, and was sympathetic to the government of Philippe Pétain throughout its existence.

Throughout the World War II period, Louis II kept Roblot as his Minister of State despite his affiliations with pro-fascist individuals, and despite demands by the Monesgasque and French populations to dismiss him. When Italy occupied Monaco in 1942 and when Nazi Germany took over from them in 1943, Roblot was permitted to keep his position and played an important role in the governing of both occupations. After the Germans left Monaco in late 1944. Roblot forbid pro-Allied demonstrations. At his return to Monaco, Rainier, alarmed by the actions undertaken during and after the occupation, went to see Louis II and personally asked for Roblot's dismissal from his position. Louis III refused but Roblot decided to resign the position in September 1944 due to popular demand by the Monesgasque population. Eventually, no charges were pressed and no trials took place in the country after the war.

== Honours ==
- Monaco: Sovereign of the Order of Saint-Charles
- Vichy France: Medal of the Order of the Francisque

Political offices
Preceded by Henry Mauran	Minister of State of Monaco; 1937–1944	Succeeded by Pierre Blanchy
