= Maurice Bouilloux-Lafont =

Minister of State of Monaco from 1932 to 1937

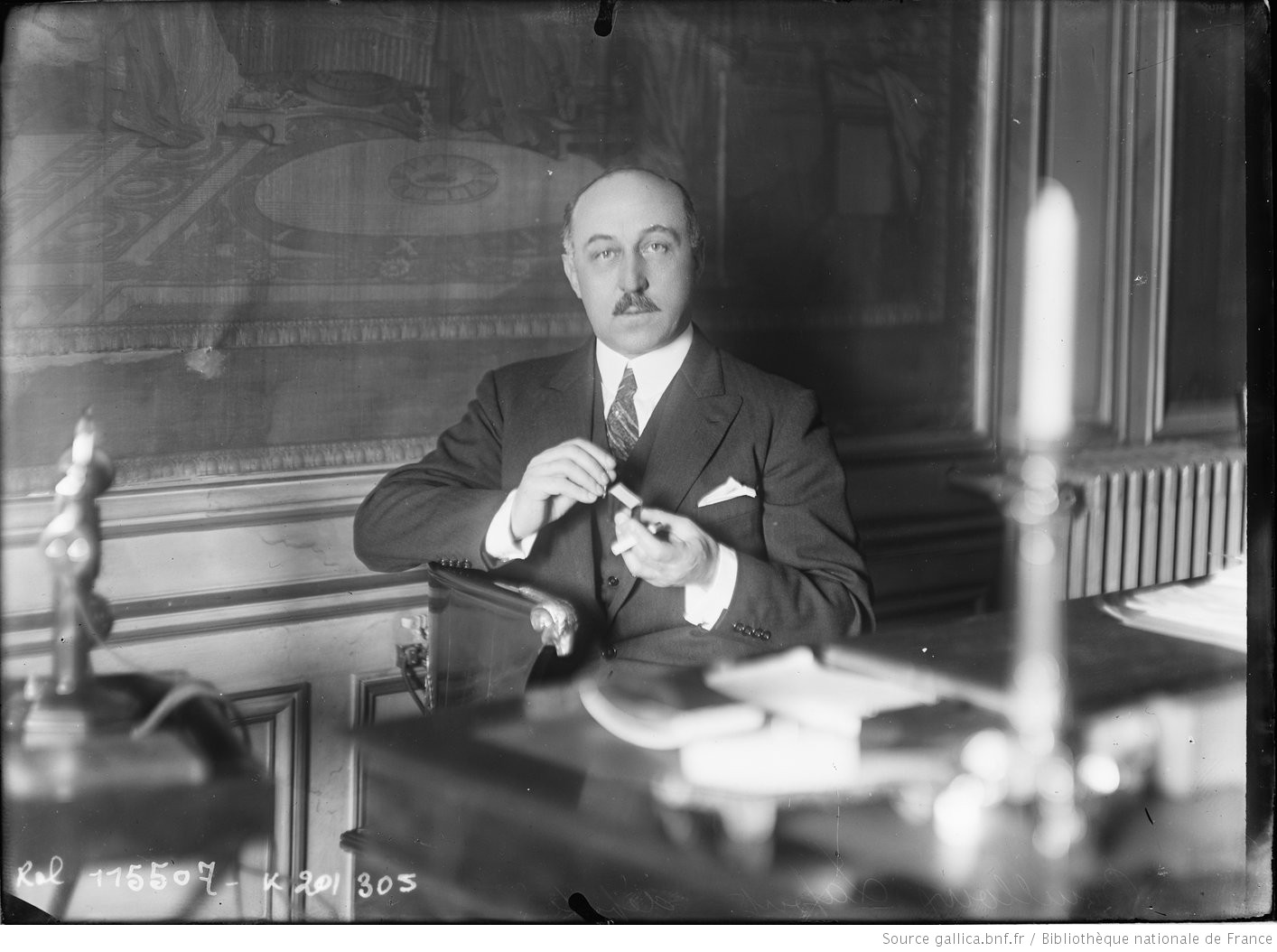

4th Minister of State of Monaco
- In office June 1932 – June 1937
- Monarch: Louis II
- Preceded by: Henry Mauran (acting)
- Succeeded by: Henry Mauran (acting)

French Deputy
- In office 10 May 1914 – 10 May 1932
- Preceded by: Pierre Hugot-Derville (acting)
- Succeeded by: Pierre Puchus (acting)
- Constituency: Finistère

Personal details
- Born: 10 April 1875 La Ferté-Alais, France
- Died: 29 July 1937 (aged 62) Barcelonnette, France
- Political party: Independent, RDG (1914-1924), GR (1924-1932)

Maurice Bouilloux-Lafont (French pronunciation: [mɔʁis buju lafɔ̃]; 10 April 1875 – 29 July 1937) was a minister of state for Monaco. He served between June 1932 and June 1937.

== Biography ==
Brother of Marcel Bouilloux-Lafont, he is his partner in the direction of the family bank. He also had a sister, Gabrielle Bouilloux-Lafont had married Louis Jay. Having married a wealthy heiress of a Quimper family, he moved to Bénodet, of which became he mayor in 1912.

He was also a general councillor of the canton of Concarn until 1934. He was Member of Parliament for Finistère from 1914, first inscribed in the group of the Democratic Republican Left, then in the Radical Left Group.

He was secretary of the Chamber from 1917 to 1919, and vice-president from 1924 to 1930. In 1931, his opponents used the Aéropostale affair, in which his brother and the family bank were involved, to weaken him. Beaten in the 1932 elections, he was appointed Minister of State of the Principality of Monaco, a position he held until 1937.

On 2 October 1928, he was seriously injured in a car accident at Scrignac in Finistère, in which Theodore Le Hars, Senator of Finistère, died.

== Literature ==
- Jean-Rémy Bézias: La France et l'intégration internationale de la principauté de Monaco (1918-1939), in: Guerres mondiales et conflits contemporains, No. 221 (January 2006), pp. 93–103. Available here.

Political offices
Preceded by Henry Mauran	Minister of State of Monaco; 1932–1937	Succeeded by Henry Mauran
