= Louis II of Monaco =

Prince of Monaco from 1922 to 1949

Louis II
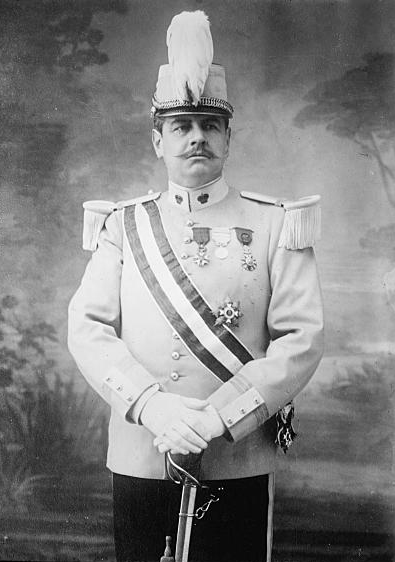
- Formal portrait, 1923

Prince of Monaco
- Reign: 26 June 1922 – 9 May 1949
- Predecessor: Albert I
- Successor: Rainier III
- Ministers of state: See list: Raymond Le Bourdon Maurice Piette Henry Mauran (acting) Maurice Bouilloux-Lafont Henry Mauran (acting) Émile Roblot Pierre Blanchy (acting) Pierre de Witasse Pierre Blanchy (acting)
- Born: 12 July 1870; Baden-Baden, Baden
- Died: 9 May 1949 (aged 78); Prince's Palace, Monaco
- Burial: Cathedral of Our Lady Immaculate
- Spouse: Ghislaine Dommanget (m. 1946)
- Issue: Charlotte, Hereditary Princess of Monaco
Names
- Louis Honoré Charles Antoine Grimaldi
- House: Grimaldi
- Father: Albert I, Prince of Monaco
- Mother: Mary Victoria Hamilton
- Military career
- Allegiance: Monaco; France
- Branch: French Army
- Service years: 1895–1899; 1914–1918 (end of active service)
- Rank: Brigadier general
- Unit: 5th Army
- Conflicts: World War I

Louis II (Louis Honoré Charles Antoine Grimaldi; 12 July 1870 – 9 May 1949) was Prince of Monaco from 26 June 1922 to 9 May 1949.

== Early years ==
Born in Baden-Baden, Louis II was the only child of Albert I, Prince of Monaco (1848–1922), and Lady Mary Victoria Douglas-Hamilton (1850–1922). His mother was a daughter of William Hamilton, 11th Duke of Hamilton and Princess Marie Amelie of Baden.

Louis was born within a year of his parents' marriage, but his mother, a strong-willed 19-year-old, disliked Monaco and was unhappy with her husband. She left the country permanently shortly after the birth, and the couple's marriage was annulled in 1880. Louis was raised in Germany by his mother and stepfather, Count (later Prince) Tassilo Festetics von Tolna, along with his eldest half-sister Maria-Mathilde (later grandmother of Princess Ira von Fürstenberg); he did not see his father until age 11 when he was obliged to return to Monaco to be trained for his future princely duties.

Louis's father, Prince Albert I, was a dominating personality who had made Monaco a centre of cultural activity and whose intellectual achievements were recognized around the world. Unhappy to be living with his cold and distant father, Louis went to France as soon as he was old enough to enroll in Saint-Cyr, the French national military college. Four years later, after graduating, he was attached to the French Foreign Legion and then served with a regiment of Chasseurs d'Afrique (African Light Horse) in Algeria.

Before being stationed in Algeria, he met Marie Juliette Louvet (1867–1930), a cabaret singer, on a short official visit to Paris. Juliette was already the mother of two children, Georges and Marguerite, by her former husband, French "girlie" photographer Achille Delmaet (1860–1914). Reportedly, Prince Louis fell deeply in love but, because of her ignominious station in life, his father would not permit the marriage. It has been asserted that Louis ignored his father and married Juliette in 1897: there is, however, no evidence for this allegation. They had an out-of-wedlock daughter, Charlotte Louise Juliette, born on 30 September 1898 in Constantine, Algeria. There is no mention of Louvet in the authorized biography of her grandson, Prince Rainier III, who is Monegasque by nationality but whose ancestors include people of French, Mexican, Italian, German, Scottish, and English nationality.

Louis served in the French Army for four years from 1895 to 1899, reaching the rank of lieutenant. He was awarded the médaille coloniale (Colonial Medal) and the Cross of the Legion of Honor. At the conclusion of his military service, he returned to Monaco, leaving behind his mistress and daughter. At the outbreak of World War I, he re-enlisted in the French Army as a volunteer, serving as a staff officer under General Franchet d’Espèrey. Louis was made a Grand Officer of the Legion of Honor and eventually became a brigadier general.

== Solution to succession aspects in 1911–18 ==
A political crisis loomed for the Prince because without any other heir, the throne of Monaco would pass to his first cousin Wilhelm, the 2nd Duke of Urach, a German nobleman who was a son of Prince Albert's aunt, Princess Florestine of Monaco. To ensure this did not happen, in 1911 a law was passed recognizing his out-of-wedlock daughter, Charlotte, as Louis's acknowledged heir, and making her part of the princely family. This law was later held to be invalid, and thus another law was passed in 1918 modifying the statutes to allow the adoption of an heir with succession rights. Charlotte was formally adopted by Louis in 1919 and became Charlotte Louise Juliette Grimaldi, Princess of Monaco and Duchess of Valentinois.

Wilhelm, 2nd Duke of Urach, thus placed further back in the line of succession to the throne of Monaco, was chosen as King of Lithuania for a few months in 1918, being known as Mindaugas II. It is a moot point whether he could be the sovereign of two European countries simultaneously, had he in fact succeeded to the throne of Monaco, but he had several sons. He renounced his claim to the principality in 1924, passing it to other French cousins that were also descended from the Grimaldi family, the counts of Chabrillan.

On 17 July 1918, largely because of the von Urach potential claim, France and Monaco signed a brief but far-reaching treaty requiring prior French approval of all future Monégasque princes. Article 2 specified: "Measures concerning the international relations of the Principality shall always be the subject of prior consultations between the Government of the Principality and the French Government. The same shall apply to measures concerning directly or indirectly the exercise of a regency or succession to the throne, which shall, whether by marriage or adoption or otherwise, pass only to a person who is of French or Monégasque nationality and is approved by the French Government." Under Article 3, Prince Albert agreed "...for himself and his successors the commitment assumed towards the French Government not to alienate the Principality, in whole or in part, in favour of any Power other than France."

== Reign ==
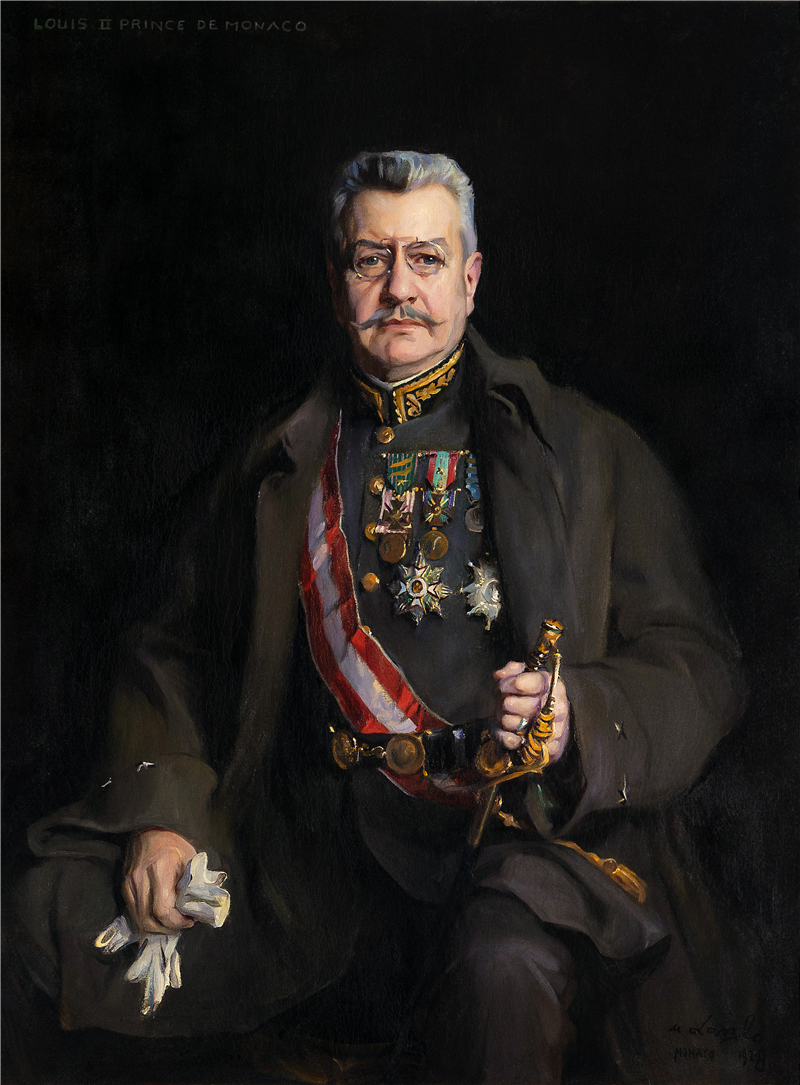
Portrait by Philip de László, 1928

On 26 June 1922, Prince Albert I died in Paris. Louis Grimaldi ascended to the throne as Louis II, Prince of Monaco. While his reign never achieved the grandeur of his father, Louis II left an indelible imprint on the principality. In 1924 the Monaco Football Club was formed and in 1929, the first Grand Prix of Monaco automobile race was held, won by William Grover-Williams, driving a Bugatti painted in what would become the famous British racing green color. He collected artefacts belonging to Napoleon I which are now assembled and displayed in the Napoleon Museum attached to the Prince's Palace in Monte Carlo.

Particularly in the earlier years of Louis's reign, he acquired the reputation for administrative probity: he obtained the departure of Camille Blanc who had long managed Monte Carlo Casino yet who faced increasing questions regarding his administration of the casino's affairs.

In 1931 revolutionaries planned to depose Louis II and replace him with Prince Pierre, Duke of Valentinois, his son-in-law. This was provoked by agitation from the administrator of the Monte Carlo Casino, René Léon, and planned to also dismantle the influence of the casino over the principality. The date was set for 15 April of that year but never materialised for unknown reasons.

In 1931, the prestige of Monaco's cultural life received a boost when René Blum was hired to form the Ballet de l'Opéra à Monte-Carlo. Just before the outbreak of World War II in 1939, a modern large football stadium was built where the Universiade were staged at the newly named "Stade Prince Louis II".

While Louis's sympathies were strongly pro-French, he supported the Vichy France government of his old army colleague, Marshal Pétain. Nonetheless, his principality was beset with domestic conflict partly as a result of Louis's indecisiveness, partly due to his questionable financial links with the Nazi regime, and also because the majority of the population was of Italian descent and supported the fascist regime of Italy's Benito Mussolini. Throughout the war, Louis's vacillation caused an enormous rift with his grandson Rainier (the heir-presumptive to the throne after 1944), who strongly supported the Allies.

In 1942, the Italian Army invaded and occupied Monaco. Shortly thereafter, following Mussolini's overthrow in Italy, Nazi Germany occupied Monaco. On the night of August 27, 1942, Monaco authorities rounded up 90 Jewish residents and handed them over to the Nazis; all but nine were murdered in the Holocaust. Among them was René Blum, founder of the Opera, who was murdered in the Nazi concentration camp Auschwitz.

For a number of months in 1944, communists participated in the liberation administration of Monaco.

Following the liberation of Monaco by the Allied forces, the 75-year-old Prince Louis did little for his principality and it began to fall into severe neglect. By 1946, he was spending most of his time in Paris. On 24–27 July of that year, he married in Monaco for the first time. His wife was Ghislaine Dommanget (13 October 1900 – 30 April 1991) a French film actress and former wife of actor André Brulé. Absent from Monaco during most of the final years of his reign, he and his wife lived at Marchais, their family estate in northern France.

== Death and succession ==
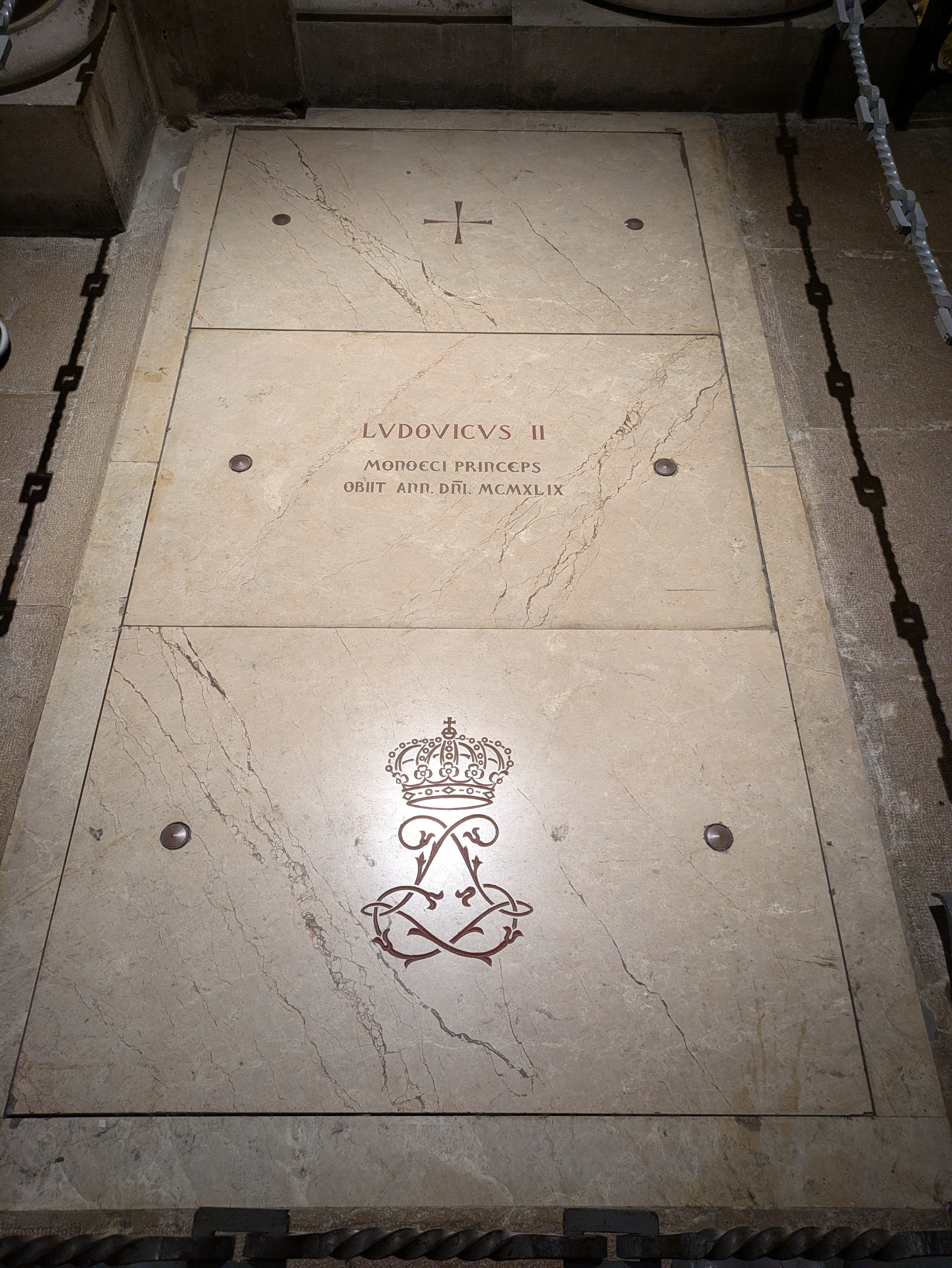
Louis's tomb

Prince Louis II died in 1949 in the Prince's Palace and is buried at the Saint Nicholas Cathedral in Monte Carlo, Monaco. His daughter, Charlotte, had ceded her succession rights to her son, Rainier, in 1944, at which time he became hereditary prince. Thus, when Louis II died five years later, he was succeeded by his grandson, Rainier III.

== Honours ==
Princely monogram of Prince Louis II of Monaco

- France:
  - Grand Cross of the Legion of Honour
  - Medal of the Order of the Francisque
  - Badge of the Brigadier General
  - Badge of the French Foreign Legion
- Baden: Grand Cross of the Military Merit Order of Karl-Friedrich
- Denmark: Knight of the Order of the Elephant, 23 March 1929
- Italy:
  - Kingdom of Italy:
    - Knight with Collar of the Supreme Order of the Most Holy Annunciation
    - Grand Cross of the Order of Saints Maurice and Lazarus
  - (Italy) Italian Republic: Grand Cross of the Order of Merit of the Italian Republic
- Holy See: Knight of the Order of Pius IX
- Portugal: 298th Grand Cross of the Order of Prince Henry
- San Marino: Grand Cross of the Order of San Marino, 30 March 1935
- Sweden:
  - Commander Grand Cross of the Order of the Polar Star, 1906
  - Knight of the Order of the Seraphim, 9 April 1923
- Württemberg: Grand Cross of the Order of the Württemberg Crown, 1889

== Ancestry ==
Ancestors of Louis II of Monaco

16. Honoré IV, Prince of Monaco
8. Florestan I, Prince of Monaco
17. Louise d’Aumont-Mazarin
4. Charles III, Prince of Monaco
18. Charles-Thomas Gibert
9. Maria Caroline Gibert de Lametz
19. Marie-Françoise Le Gras de Vaubercey
2. Albert I, Prince of Monaco
20. Guillaume-Charles, Count de Merode, Prince de Rubempré
10. Count Werner Jean-Baptiste de Merode
21. Marie Joséphine d'Ongnies, Countess of Mastaing, Princess van Grimberghen
5. Countess Antoinette Ghislaine de Merode
22. Count François Louis de Spangen d'Uyternesse
11. Countess Victoire de Spangen d'Uyternesse
23. Baroness Louise Xavière de Flaveau de Henry de la Raudière
1.Louis II, Prince of Monaco
24. Archibald Hamilton, 9th Duke of Hamilton
12. Alexander Hamilton, 10th Duke of Hamilton
25. Lady Harriet Stewart
6. William Hamilton, 11th Duke of Hamilton
26. William Thomas Beckford
13. Susan Euphemia Beckford
27. Lady Margaret Gordon
3. Lady Mary Victoria Hamilton
28. Charles Louis, Hereditary Prince of Baden
14. Charles, Grand Duke of Baden
29. Landgravine Amalie of Hesse-Darmstadt
7. Princess Marie Amelie of Baden
30. Claude de Beauharnais, 2nd Count of Roches-Baritaud
15. Stéphanie de Beauharnais
31. Claudine Françoise de Lézay-Marnézia

== Notes ==
Louis II of Monaco House of Grimaldi Born: 12 July 1870 Died: 9 May 1949
Regnal titles
Preceded by Albert I	Prince of Monaco; 1922–1949	Succeeded by Rainier III
Monegasque royalty
Preceded by Albert	Hereditary Prince of Monaco; 1889–1922	Succeeded by Charlotte
Preceded by Albert	Marquis of Baux; 1889–1944	Succeeded by Rainier
French nobility
Preceded by Albert I of Monaco	Duke of Estouteville; Duke of Valentinois; 1922–1949	Extinct
