= Rainier III of Monaco =

Prince of Monaco from 1949 to 2005

Rainier III
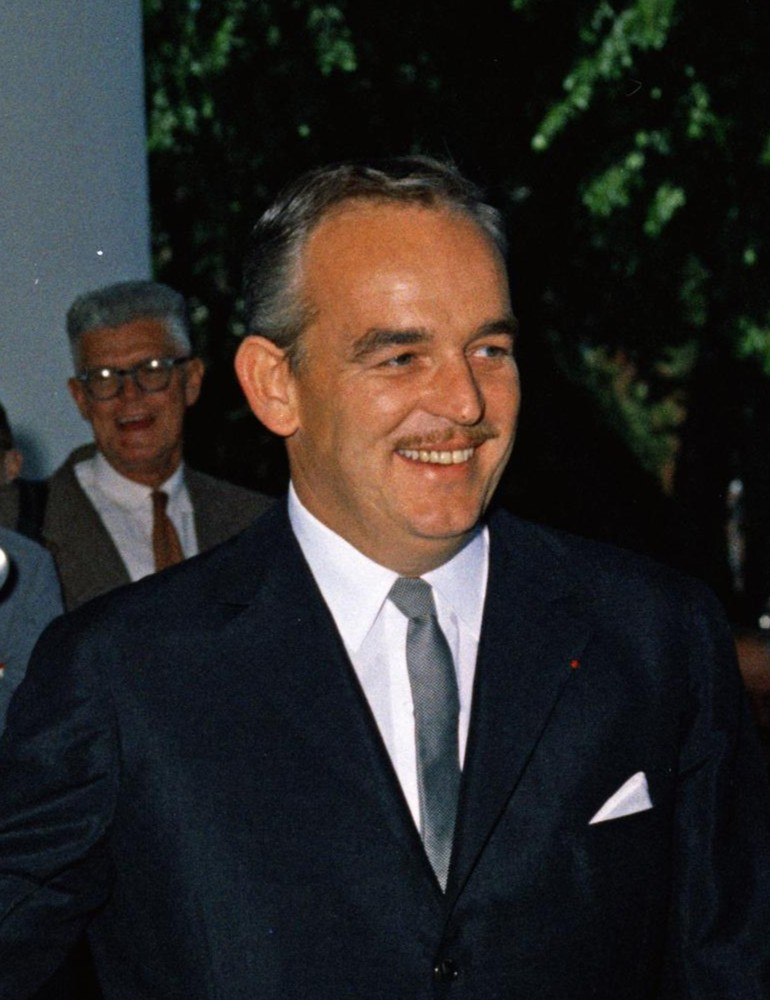
- Rainier in 1961

Prince of Monaco
- Reign: 9 May 1949 – 6 April 2005
- Predecessor: Louis II
- Successor: Albert II
- Regent: Albert (2005)
- Born: 31 May 1923; Prince's Palace of Monaco, Monaco
- Died: 6 April 2005 (aged 81); Cardiothoracic Centre of Monaco, Monaco
- Burial: 15 April 2005; Cathedral of Our Lady Immaculate, Monaco
- Spouse: Grace Kelly (m. 1956; died 1982)
- Issue: Caroline, Princess of Hanover; Albert II, Prince of Monaco; Princess Stéphanie
Names
- Rainier Louis Henri Maxence Bertrand Grimaldi
- House: Grimaldi
- Father: Pierre de Polignac
- Mother: Charlotte, Hereditary Princess of Monaco
- Religion: Roman Catholicism
- Education: University of Montpellier; Sciences Po

Rainier III (Rainier Louis Henri Maxence Bertrand Grimaldi; (Note: French pronunciation: [ʁɛnje lwi ɑ̃ʁi maksɑ̃s bɛʁtʁɑ̃ ɡʁimaldi]) 31 May 1923 – 6 April 2005) was Prince of Monaco from 1949 until his death in 2005.

Rainier was born at the Prince's Palace of Monaco as the only son of Hereditary Princess Charlotte and Prince Pierre. During his reign, he was responsible for the transformation of Monaco's economy, shifting from its traditional casino gambling base to its current status as a tax haven and cultural destination. The Prince also coordinated the substantial reforms of Monaco's constitution, which limited the powers of sovereign rule.

Rainier married American film star Grace Kelly in 1956, which generated global media attention. They had three children: Caroline, Albert and Stéphanie. Rainier died in April 2005 from complications relating to a lung infection compromised by years of cigarette smoking; he was succeeded by his son, Albert II. His reign of 56 years is the second-longest in Monégasque history, after Honoré III.

== Early life ==
Rainier was born on 31 May 1923 at Prince's Palace in Monaco, the first native-born prince since Honoré IV in 1758. Rainier's mother, Charlotte, was the only child of Louis II, Prince of Monaco, and his lover, Marie Juliette Louvet; she was legitimised through formal adoption and subsequently named heiress presumptive to the throne of Monaco. Rainier's father, Count Pierre of Polignac, who was half-French and half-Mexican, adopted his wife's dynasty name, Grimaldi, upon marriage and was made a Prince of Monaco by his father-in-law. Rainier had an older sister, Princess Antoinette, Baroness of Massy. His parents divorced in 1933.

Rainier's early education was conducted in England, at the public schools of Summerfields in St Leonards-on-Sea, Sussex, and after 1935 at Stowe School, in Buckinghamshire. Rainier then attended the Institut Le Rosey in Rolle and Gstaad, Switzerland from 1939, before continuing to the University of Montpellier in France, where he obtained a Bachelor of Arts degree in 1943, before studying at Sciences Po Paris in Paris.

In 1944, the day before his 21st birthday, Rainier's mother renounced her right to the Monégasque throne and Rainier became Prince Louis's direct heir. In World War II, Rainier joined the Free French Army in September 1944, and served under General Joseph de Goislard de Monsabert as a second lieutenant. As a soldier, he witnessed action during the German counter-offensive in Alsace. Rainier received the French Croix de Guerre with bronze star (representing a brigade level citation) and was given the rank of Legion of Honor in 1947. Following his decommission from the French Army, he was promoted by the French government to captain in April 1949 and colonel in December 1954.

== Reign ==
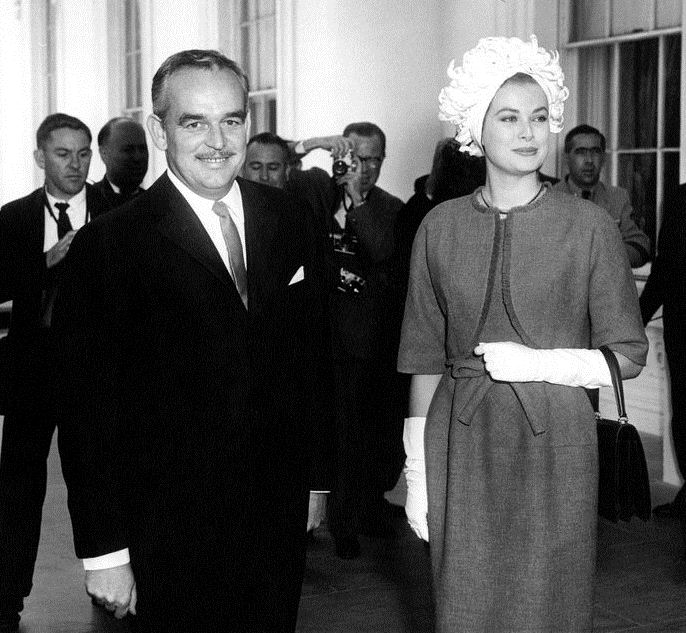
Prince Rainier III and Princess Grace arrive at the White House for a luncheon in May 1961.

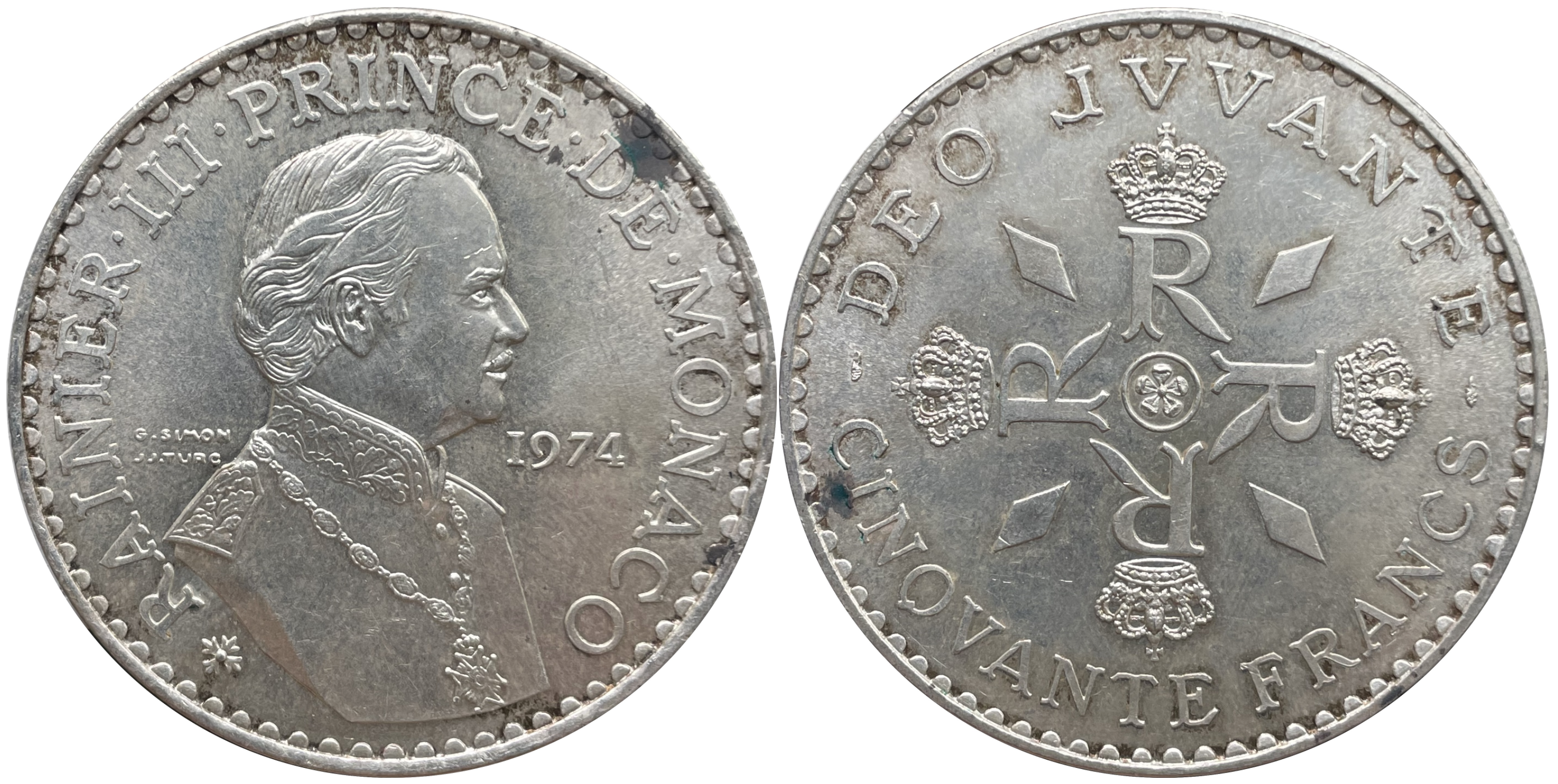
Silver coin: 50 Francs, 25th Anniversary of Rainier III reign of Principality of Monaco (1949 – 1974)

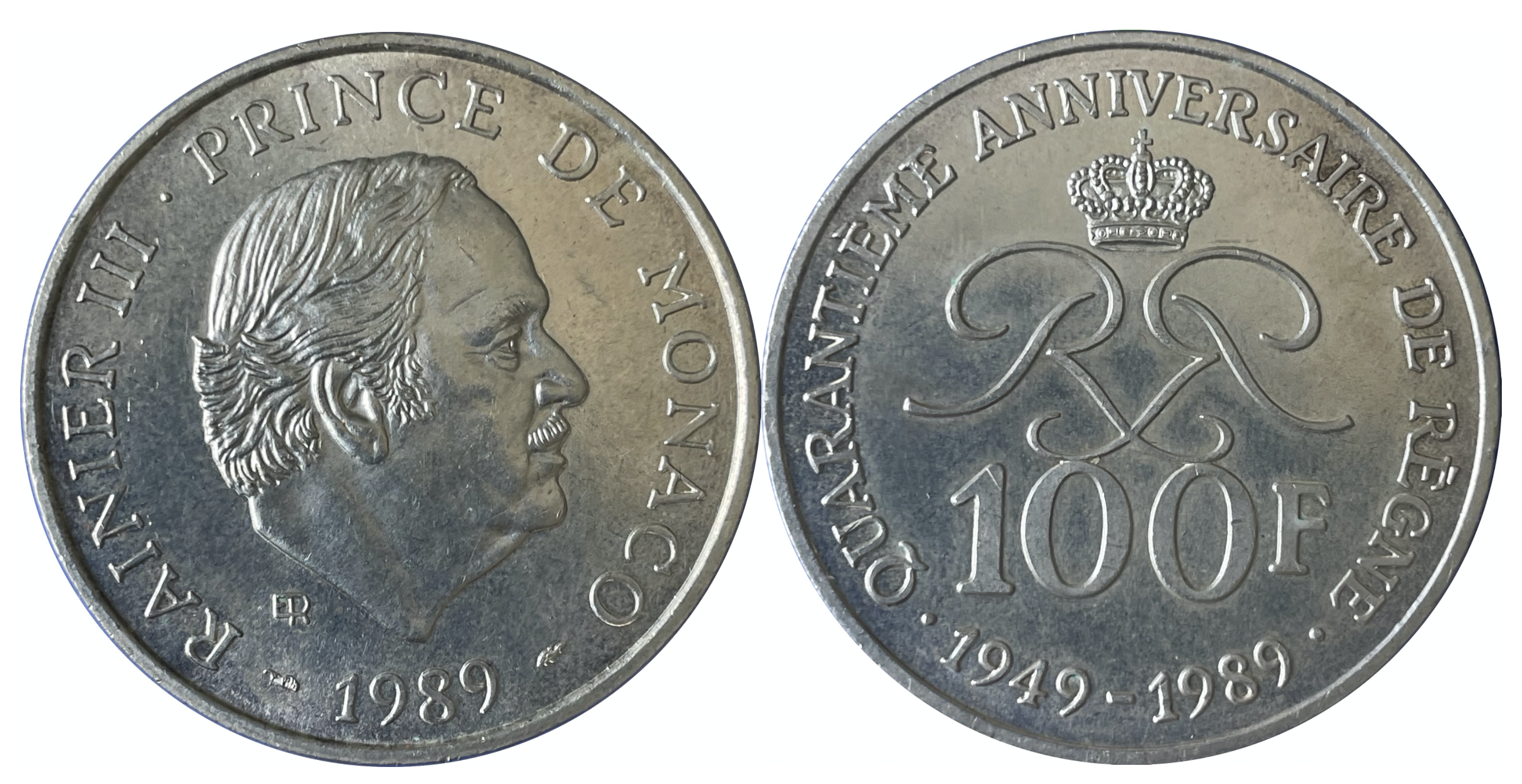
Silver coin: 100 Francs, 40th Anniversary of Rainier III reign of Principality of Monaco (1949 – 1989)

Rainier became the Sovereign Prince of Monaco at the age of 25 upon the death of his maternal grandfather, Prince Louis II, on 9 May 1949. He worked to recoup Monaco's lustre, which had become tarnished through financial neglect and scandal (his mother, Princess Charlotte, took a noted jewel thief known as René the Cane as her lover). Upon ascension, the Prince found a treasury that was practically empty. Monaco's traditional gambling clientele, largely European aristocrats, found themselves with reduced funds after World War II. Other successful gambling centres had opened to compete with Monaco. To compensate for the loss of income, Rainier decided to promote Monaco as a tax haven, commercial centre, real-estate development opportunity, and international tourist attraction. The early years of his reign saw the overweening involvement of the Greek shipping tycoon Aristotle Onassis, who took control of the Société des Bains de Mer and envisioned Monaco as solely a gambling resort. Prince Rainier regained control of SBM in 1964, effectively ensuring that his vision of Monaco would be implemented.

During his reign, the Societé Monégasque de Banques et de Métaux Précieux, a bank which held a significant amount of Monaco's capital, was bankrupted by its investments in a media company in 1955, leading to the resignation of Monaco's cabinet. In 1962, Rainier ratified the Principality's new constitution, which significantly reduced the power of the sovereign. He had suspended the previous constitution in 1959, saying that it "has hindered the administrative and political life of the country". The changes ended autocratic rule, placing power with both the Prince and a National Council of eighteen elected members.

At the time of his death, he was the world's second longest-serving incumbent head of state, after King Bhumibol Adulyadej of Thailand, and the longest-reigning monarch in Europe.

== Personal life ==
In the 1940s and 1950s, Rainier had a ten-year relationship with the French film actress Gisèle Pascal, whom he had met while a student at Montpellier University, and the couple lived at Saint-Jean-Cap-Ferrat. Rainier's sister, Princess Antoinette, wishing her own son to ascend the throne, spread rumors that Pascal was infertile. The rumours combined with a snobbery over Pascal's family origins ultimately ended the relationship.

Rainier established a postal museum in 1995: the Museum of Stamps and Coins, in Monaco's Fontvieille district by using the collections of the Monégasque princes Albert I and Louis II. The prestigious philatelic collectors organization, Club de Monte-Carlo de l'Élite de la Philatélie, was established in 1999 under his direct patronage. The club is headquartered at the postal museum, and its membership restricted to institutions and one hundred prestigious collectors. Rainier organized exhibitions of rare and exceptional postage stamps and letters with the club's members.

Throughout his reign, Rainier surveyed the creation of Monégasque stamps. He preferred stamps printed in intaglio and the art of engravers Henri Cheffer and Czesław Słania.

Rainier's car collection was opened to the public as the Monaco Top Cars Collection in Fontvieille.

=== Marriage and family ===
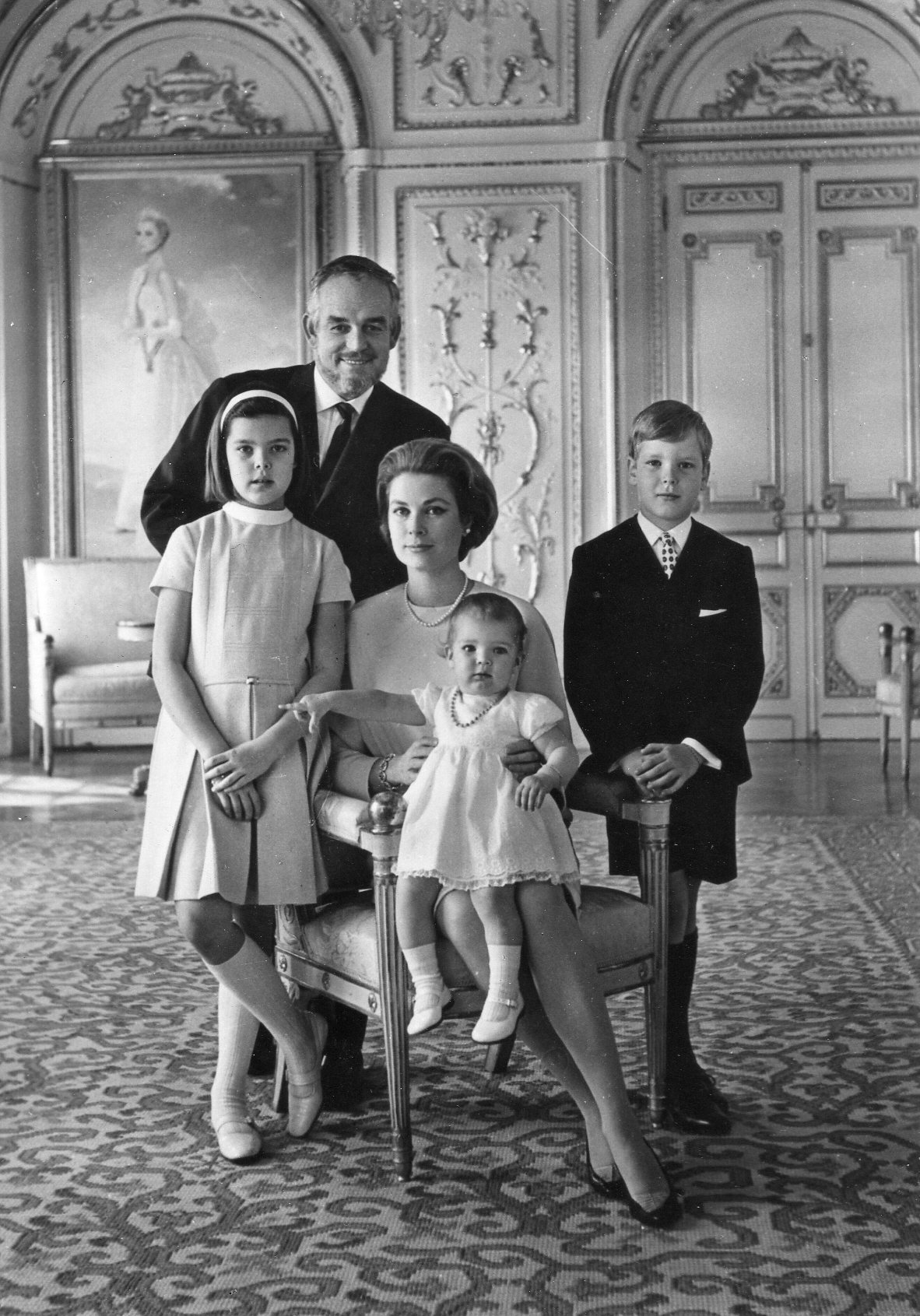
The Princely Family in 1966

The Prince met Academy Award–winning actress Grace Kelly, in 1955, during a photocall at the Palace scheduled to support her trip to the Cannes Film Festival. After a year-long courtship described as containing "a good deal of rational appraisal on both sides," Prince Rainier married Kelly in 1956.

The union was met with mass attention from the public, and was described as the "wedding of the century" and the "world's most anticipated wedding" by the media. The civil ceremony took place at the Palace on 18 April, with the religious wedding being held on 19 April at the Saint Nicholas Cathedral. Rainier wore a military uniform of his own design, based on the uniforms of Napoleon Bonaparte. Presided over by Bishop Gilles Barthe, the marriage was broadcast by MGM Studios, and viewed by over 30 million people across the globe. The couple honeymooned in the Mediterranean on their yacht, Deo Juvante II.

Princess Grace gave birth to their first child, Princess Caroline, on 23 January 1957. Their second child and heir, Prince Albert, was born on 14 March 1958. Their youngest, Princess Stéphanie, was born 1 February 1965, with all children having been delivered at the Palace.

In 1979, the Prince made his acting debut alongside the Princess in a half-hour independent film, Rearranged, produced in Monaco. After its premiere in Monaco, Princess Grace showed it to ABC TV executives, in New York in 1982, who expressed interest if extra scenes were shot. Later that year, Grace died in a car crash caused by a cerebral hemorrhage, making it impossible to expand the film for an American release. After Grace's death, Rainier refused to remarry. He established the Princess Grace Foundation-USA in 1982 in her honor, to support fledging American artists.

Until his death, Prince Rainier III would lay a single flower on the resting place of Princess Grace each morning.

== Illness and death ==
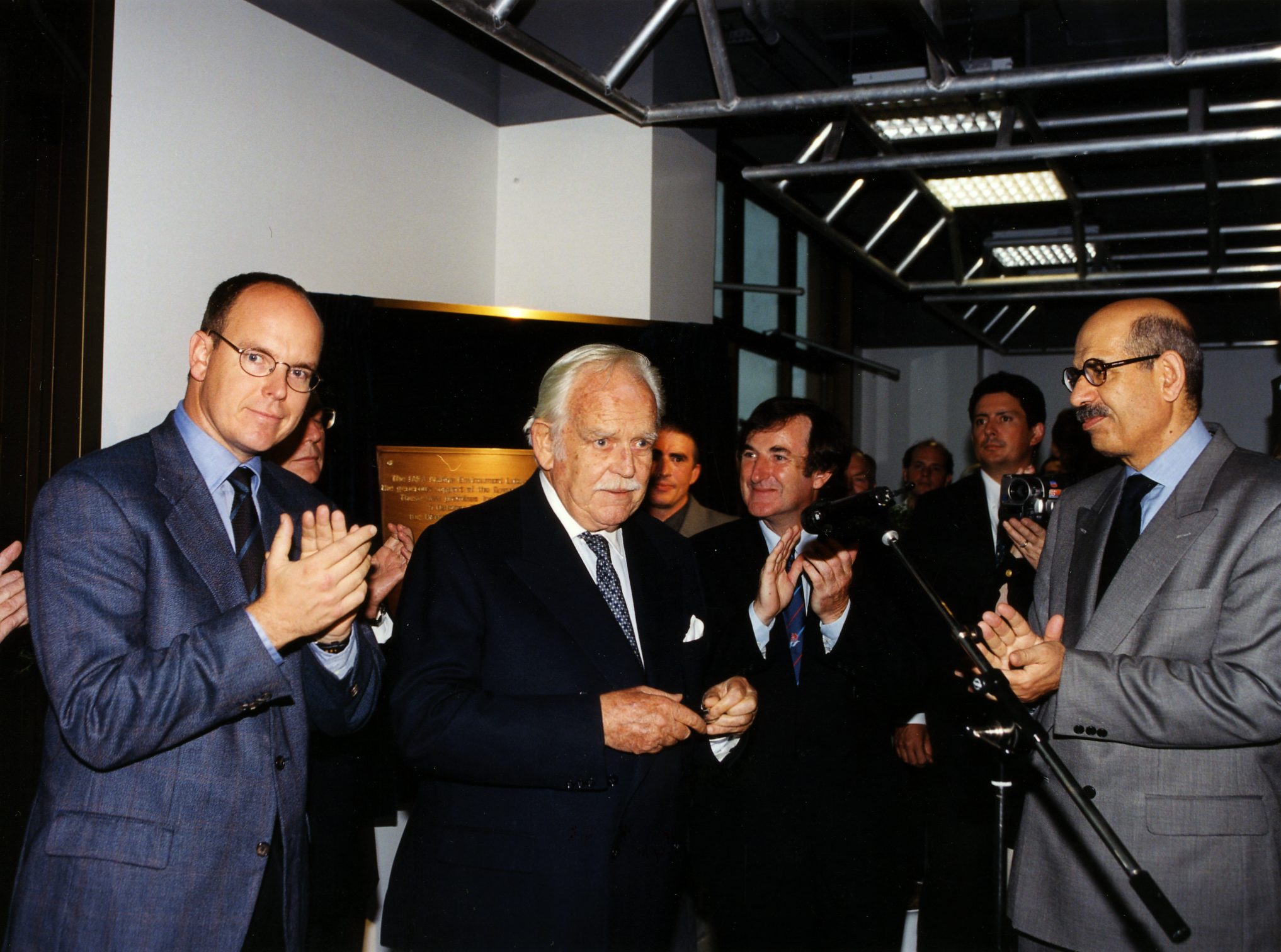
Prince Rainier III (middle) with his son Albert (left) in 1998

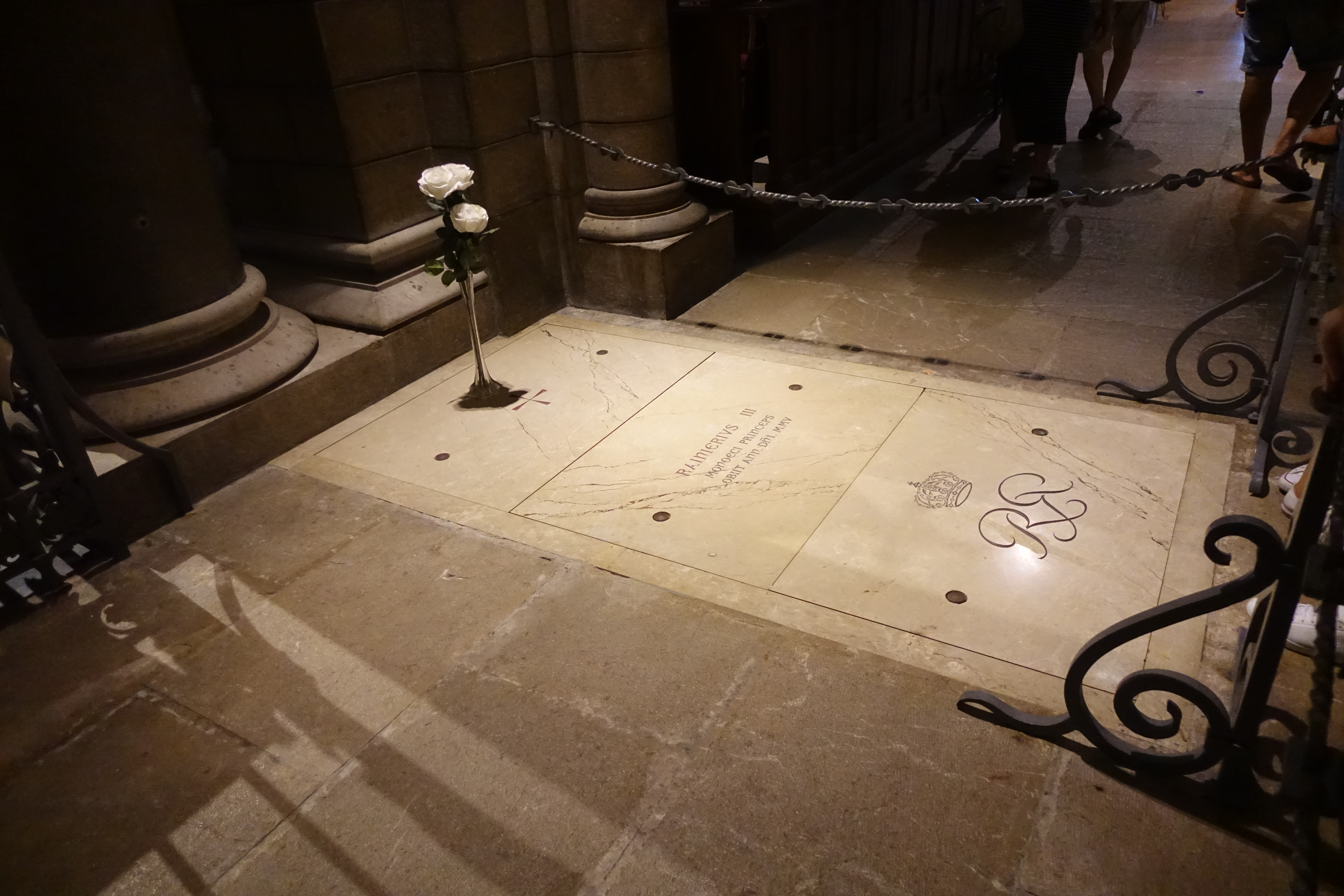
The tomb of Prince Rainier III at the Cathedral of Our Lady Immaculate

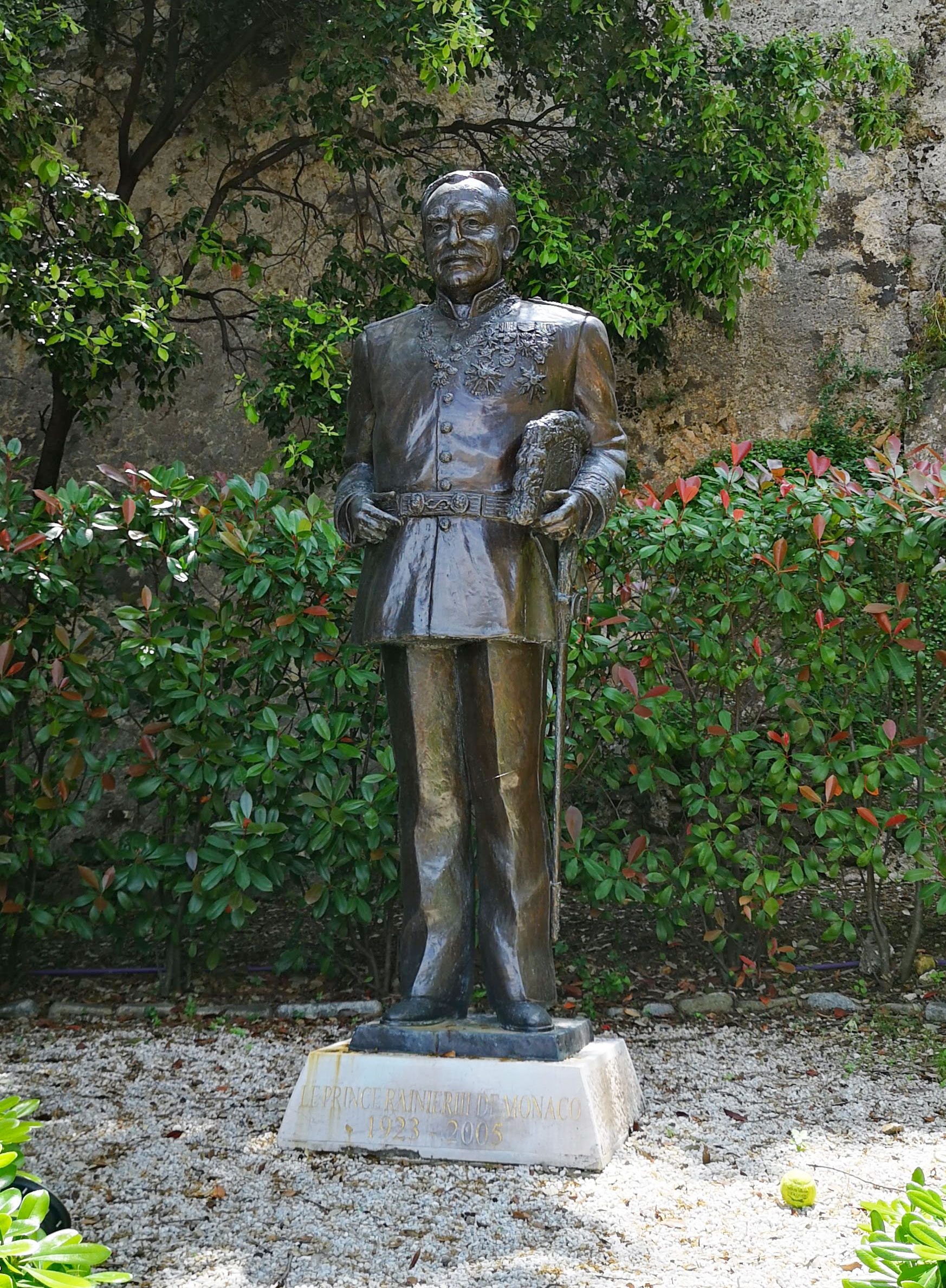
Life-size bronze statue of Prince Rainier III by Dutch sculptor Kees Verkade

Rainier smoked sixty cigarettes a day. In the final years of his life, his health progressively declined. He underwent surgery in late 1999 and 2000, and was hospitalised in November 2002 for a chest infection. He spent three weeks in hospital in January 2004 for what was described as general fatigue. In February 2004, he was hospitalised with a coronary lesion and a damaged blood vessel. In October of that year, he was again admitted to hospital with a lung infection. His son, Hereditary Prince Albert, later appeared on CNN's Larry King Live and told Larry King that his father was fine, though he was suffering from bronchitis.

On 7 March 2005, he was again hospitalised for a lung infection. On 22 March, he was moved to the hospital's intensive care unit. The following day, it was announced he was on a ventilator, suffering from renal and heart failure. On 26 March, the palace reported that, despite intensive ongoing efforts to improve the prince's health, he was continuing to deteriorate; however, on 27 March, he was reported to be conscious, his heart and kidney conditions having stabilised. His prognosis remained "very reserved".

On 31 March, following consultation with the Crown Council of Monaco, the Palais Princier announced that Hereditary Prince Albert would take over the duties of his father as regent, since Rainier was no longer able to exercise his princely functions. On 1 April 2005, the Palace announced that Rainier's doctors believed his chances of recovery were "slim". On 6 April, Prince Rainier III died at the Cardiothoracic Centre of Monaco at 6:35 am local time at the age of 81. His son subsequently became the new Prince of Monaco as Albert II.

His funeral was held on 15 April at the Cathedral of Our Lady Immaculate, where Rainier and Grace had married nearly fifty years earlier. He was laid to rest beside his wife. Rainier's death was overshadowed in the media, as it occurred shortly after that of Pope John Paul II.

== Honours ==
- France: Grand Cross of the Order of the Legion of Honour
- Iranian Imperial Family: Recipient of the Commemorative Medal of the 2,500-year Celebration of the Persian Empire
- Italy: Grand Cross with Collar of the Order of Merit of the Italian Republic
- Nicaragua: Grand Cross of the Order of Rubén Darío
- Portugal: Grand Cross with Collar of the Military Order of Saint James of the Sword
- San Marino: Grand Cross of the Equestrian Order of Saint Marinus
- Sovereign Military Order of Malta: Knight Grand Cross with Collar of the Order of Merit

=== Awards ===
- International Olympic Committee: Recipient of the Gold Olympic Order

=== Monuments ===
In 2012, a monument to Rainier III and Grace Kelly was erected in Yoshkar-Ola, Russia.

== Arms and emblems ==
Coat of arms of Prince Rainier III of Monaco	Monogram of Prince Rainier III	Dual cypher of Prince Rainier and Princess Grace

== Notes ==
Rainier III of Monaco House of Grimaldi Born: 31 May 1923 Died: 6 April 2005
Regnal titles
Preceded by Louis II	Prince of Monaco; 1949–2005	Succeeded by Albert II
Monegasque royalty
Preceded by Charlotte	Hereditary Prince of Monaco; 1944–1949	Vacant Title next held by Caroline
Preceded by Charlotte	Duke of Valentinois¹ (de facto); 1977–2005	Succeeded by Albert II
Preceded by Louis II	Marquis of Baux; 1944–1958	Succeeded by Albert II
Notes and references
1. Title extinct in 1949.
